= List of California state parks =

This is a list of parks, historic resources, reserves and recreation areas in the California State Parks system.

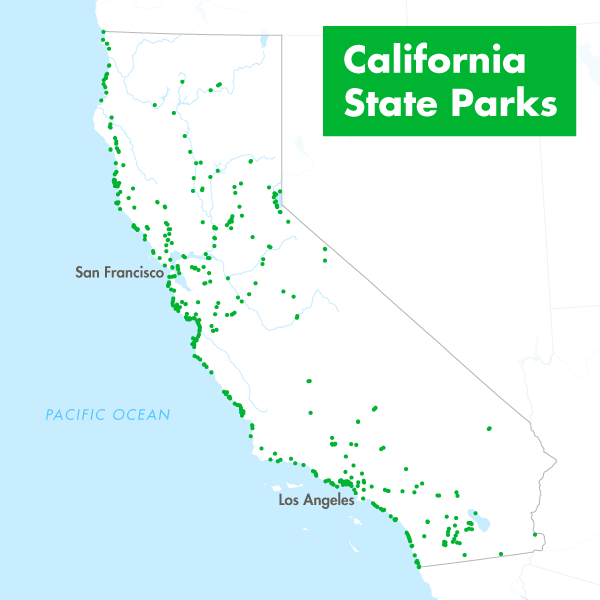
General location of California's +139 State Parks

== List of parks ==
Park name	Classification	County or counties	Size		Year established	Remarks
Park name	Classification	County or counties	acres	ha	Year established	Remarks
Admiral William Standley State Recreation Area	State recreation area	Mendocino	45	18	1944	Boasts redwoods plus salmon and steelhead fishing on the Eel River.
Ahjumawi Lava Springs State Park	State park	Shasta	5,930	2,400	1975	Preserves a wilderness of freshwater springs and geologically recent lava flows.
Albany State Marine Reserve	Park property	Alameda			1985	
Anderson Marsh State Historic Park	State historic park	Lake	1,298	525	1982	Preserves a tule marsh and ancient archaeological sites of the Pomo people.
Andrew Molera State Park	State park	Monterey	4,766	1,929	1968	Offers a primitive walk-in campground on the Big Sur coast.
Angel Island State Park	State park	Marin and San Francisco	756	306	1955	Interprets an island in San Francisco Bay whose history encompasses Coast Miwok prehistory, ranching, the 1910–1940 Angel Island Immigration Station, and long military use.
Año Nuevo State Park	State park	San Mateo	4,209	1,703	1985	Encompasses Año Nuevo Island and Año Nuevo Point, which boasts the world's largest mainland rookery of northern elephant seals.
Antelope Valley California Poppy Reserve	State natural reserve	Los Angeles	1,781	721	1976	Showcases the state's most-consistent blooms of California poppy, in the high Mojave Desert.
Antelope Valley Indian Museum State Historic Park	State historic park	Los Angeles	397	161	1979	Interprets the Native American cultures of the Great Basin and surrounding regions in a 1928 folk art building on the NRHP.
Anza-Borrego Desert State Park	State park	San Diego, Imperial, and Riverside	585,930	237,120	1933	Preserves a vast tract of the Colorado Desert in California's largest state park.
Armstrong Redwoods State Natural Reserve	State natural reserve	Sonoma	752	304	1934	Preserves a grove of coast redwoods.
Arthur B. Ripley Desert Woodland State Park	State park	Los Angeles	566	229	1993	Preserves a remnant stand of Joshua trees and junipers in the Antelope Valley.
Asilomar State Beach	State beach	Monterey	107	43	1951	Balances protection of rocky coast and dune habitat with public access. The 1913 Asilomar Conference Grounds are a National Historic Landmark.
Auburn State Recreation Area	State recreation area	El Dorado and Placer	42,377	17,149	1966	Offers numerous recreational opportunities along the North and Middle Forks of the American River.
Austin Creek State Recreation Area	State recreation area	Sonoma	5,927	2,399	1964	Features a rugged wilderness on Austin Creek, adjacent to Armstrong Redwoods State Natural Reserve.
Azalea State Natural Reserve	State natural reserve	Humboldt	30	12	1943	Harbors a profusion of spring-blooming western azaleas.
Bale Grist Mill State Historic Park	State historic park	Napa	0.75	0.30	1974	Showcases a restored 1846 water-powered grist mill in Napa Valley. The mill is on the NRHP.
Bean Hollow State Beach	State beach	San Mateo	44	18	1958	Offers fishing and beachcombing among tide pools.
Benbow State Recreation Area	State recreation area	Humboldt	1,142	462	1958	Centers on a reservoir on the South Fork Eel River.
Benicia Capitol State Historic Park	State historic park	Solano	0.86	0.35	1951	Interprets the third and oldest-surviving California capitol, used 1853–54. The building is on the NRHP.
Benicia State Recreation Area	State recreation area	Solano	447	181	1957	Preserves a tidal wetland on the Carquinez Strait.
Bethany Reservoir State Recreation Area	State recreation area	Alameda	609	246	1974	Offers windsurfing and other water recreation on the Bethany Reservoir.
Bidwell Mansion State Historic Park	State historic park	Butte	5.2	2.1	1964	Offers tours of the 1868 Victorian mansion of influential settlers John and Annie Bidwell. The mansion is on the NRHP.
Bidwell-Sacramento River State Park	State park	Butte and Glenn	349	141	1979	Preserves riparian habitat on the Sacramento River and its tributary Big Chico Creek.
Big Basin Redwoods State Park	State park	Santa Cruz	18,050	7,300	1902	Established as California's first state park, to preserve coast redwoods on Waddell Creek.
Bodie State Historic Park	State historic park	Mono	1,016	411	1962	Preserves the ghost town of Bodie, whose gold-mining heyday ran from 1877 to 1881, and is now a National Historic Landmark.
Bolsa Chica State Beach	State beach	Orange	169	68	1960	Offers surf fishing and catching grunion by hand.
Border Field State Park	State park	San Diego	1,316	533	1972	Occupies the southwesternmost point of the contiguous U.S., on the Mexico – United States border. Part of the Tijuana River National Estuarine Research Reserve.
Bothe-Napa Valley State Park	State park	Napa and Sonoma	1,991	806	1960	Contains the farthest inland coast redwoods in a California state park.
Brannan Island State Recreation Area	State recreation area	Sacramento	329	133	1952	Offers water recreation amid a maze of channels in the Sacramento–San Joaquin River Delta.
Burleigh H. Murray Ranch	Park property	San Mateo	1,325	536	1979	Encompasses a hidden valley with a historic ranch established in 1857.
Burton Creek State Park	State park	Placer	1,890	760	1976	Offers 6 miles (9.7 km) of unpaved roadway for hiking and cross-country skiing.
Butano State Park	State park	San Mateo	4,728	1,913	1956	Showcases a secluded redwood-filled valley.
Butte City Project	Park property	Butte	37	15	2007	In development, not open to public
Calaveras Big Trees State Park	State park	Calaveras and Tuolumne	6,498	2,630	1931	Protects two large groves of giant sequoias.
California Citrus State Historic Park	State historic park	Riverside	248	100	1984	Interprets the influence of the state's citrus industry.
California Indian Heritage Center State Park	State park	Yolo	7.91	3.20	2011	Undeveloped property located in West Sacramento. Plan is for this unit to eventually replace the State Indian Museum (State Historic Park).
California State Capitol Museum	Park property	Sacramento	40	16	1982	Offers exhibits and tours of the California State Capitol and its grounds.
California State Mining and Mineral Museum	Park property	Mariposa			1999	Exhibits the official state mineral collection and displays on the region's influential mining heritage.
Cambria State Marine Conservation Area	State marine park	San Luis Obispo			2007	California State Parks' first state marine park.
Candlestick Point State Recreation Area	State recreation area	San Francisco	204	83	1972	Constitutes California's first urban state recreation area, on the west shore of San Francisco Bay.
Cardiff State Beach	State beach	San Diego	507	205	1949	Provides a sandy, warm-water beach outside San Diego.
Carlsbad State Beach	State beach	San Diego	44	18	1933	Features a small beach at the foot of coastal bluffs.
Carmel River State Beach	State beach	Monterey	297	120	1953	Protects a 1-mile-long (1.6 km) beach and a lagoon at the mouth of the Carmel River which attracts many migratory birds.
Carnegie State Vehicular Recreation Area	State vehicular recreation area	Alameda and San Joaquin	5,075	2,054	1979	Provides off-roading opportunities in the Diablo Range around the former townsite of Carnegie.
Carpinteria State Beach	State beach	Santa Barbara and Ventura	62	25	1932	Offers a mile-long beach in the city of Carpinteria.
Caspar Headlands State Beach	State beach	Mendocino	75	30	1972	
Caspar Headlands State Natural Reserve	State natural reserve	Mendocino	2.7	1.1	1972	Preserves a small strip of rugged coastline.
Castaic Lake State Recreation Area	State recreation area	Los Angeles	4,224	1,709	1965	Features 29 miles (47 km) of shoreline on Castaic Lake.
Castle Crags State Park	State park	Shasta	3,905	1,580	1934	Provides access to the Castle Crags Wilderness, with its 6,000-foot-tall (1,800 m) rock crags.
Castle Rock State Park	State park	Santa Clara, Santa Cruz, and San Mateo	5,242	2,121	1968	Encompasses a wild forest with rock climbing opportunities along the crest of the Santa Cruz Mountains.
Caswell Memorial State Park	State park	San Joaquin	258	104	1952	Preserves a riparian forest along the Stanislaus River.
Cayucos State Beach	State beach	San Luis Obispo	16	6.5	1940	Provides a swimming and surfing beach in the beach town of Cayucos.
China Camp State Park	State park	Marin	1,514	613	1976	Surrounds an 1880s Chinese American shrimp-fishing village and salt marshes on San Pablo Bay.
Chino Hills State Park	State park	Orange, Riverside, and San Bernardino	14,173	5,736	1981	Preserves a large tract of the Chino Hills.
Chumash Painted Cave State Historic Park	State historic park	Santa Barbara	7.5	3.0	1976	Preserves a sandstone cave bearing rock art of the Chumash people.
Clay Pit State Vehicular Recreation Area	State vehicular recreation area	Butte	220	89	1981	Provides off-roading opportunities in the shallow clay pit excavated for material to build the Oroville Dam.
Clear Lake State Park	State park	Lake	590	240	1949	Provides recreation opportunities on the southwest shore of Clear Lake, the largest freshwater lake within California's borders.
Colonel Allensworth State Historic Park	State historic park	Tulare	3,715	1,503	1973	Interprets the town of Allensworth, founded in 1908 as a haven for African Americans by Colonel Allen Allensworth and other community leaders. The town is a district on the NRHP.
Columbia State Historic Park	State historic park	Tuolumne	273	110	1946	Interprets Columbia's preserved gold rush-era downtown, a National Historic Landmark District.
Colusa-Sacramento River State Recreation Area	State recreation area	Colusa	301	122	1955	Adjoins a stretch of the Sacramento River known for its fishing.
Corona del Mar State Beach	State beach	Orange	30	12	1947	Provides a half-mile-long swimming beach adjacent to the Newport Beach harbor jetty.
Crystal Cove State Park	State park	Orange	3,936	1,593	1979	Encompasses cliffbound coastline, inland chaparral canyons, and the NRHP-listed Crystal Cove Historic District of 1920s and 30s beach cottages.
Cuyamaca Rancho State Park	State park	San Diego	24,693	9,993	1933	Preserves an expansive tract of forests and meadows above 5,000 feet (1,500 m) in the Laguna Mountains, on the former Rancho Cuyamaca.
D. L. Bliss State Park	State park	El Dorado	2,149	870	1929	Features a balancing rock and the Rubicon Point Light on the shore of Lake Tahoe.
Del Norte Coast Redwoods State Park	State park	Del Norte	31,261	12,651	1925	Preserves old-growth coast redwoods and is managed cooperatively with RNSP.
Delta Meadows	Park property	Sacramento	472	191	1985	Preserves undeveloped wet meadows and sloughs in the Sacramento–San Joaquin River Delta. Closed to the public.
Dockweiler State Beach	State beach	Los Angeles	91	37	1948	Features 3 miles (4.8 km) of beach and a hang gliding training site, adjacent to Los Angeles International Airport.
Doheny State Beach	State beach	Orange	254	103	1931	Offers surfing and beach-front camping in Dana Point.
Donner Memorial State Park	State park	Nevada and Placer	3,293	1,333	1928	Interprets the site where the Donner Party was trapped by weather in the Sierra Nevada during the winter of 1846–1847, now a National Historic Landmark.
Dos Rios State Park	State park	Stanislaus	1,600	650	2024	Opened in June 2024, it became the newest park in the state park system. "Nestled between the Tuolumne and San Joaquin rivers, around eight miles from Modesto, [it] is the largest public-private floodplain restoration project in the state [and] the first state park to open in California since Onyx Ranch State Vehicular Recreation Area in 2014."
Eastern Kern County Onyx Ranch State Vehicular Recreation Area	State vehicular recreation area	Kern	26,000	11,000	2014	As of April 2024, it is the newest and second largest state vehicular recreation area in the state park system. It is surrounded by Bureau of Land Management lands.
Ed Z'berg Sugar Pine Point State Park	State park	El Dorado	2,324	940	1965	Comprises the Lake Tahoe estate and 1903 summer home of banker Isaias W. Hellman.
El Capitán State Beach	State beach	Santa Barbara	2,634	1,066	1953	Features a narrow beach at the foot of coastal bluffs where monarch butterflies congregate in autumn.
El Presidio de Santa Barbara State Historic Park	State historic park	Santa Barbara	5.8	2.3	1966	Preserves components of a Spanish presidio dating back to 1782, now on the NRHP.
Emerald Bay State Park	State park	El Dorado	1,533	620	1953	Contains Lake Tahoe's Emerald Bay and Fannette Island plus the 1929 Vikingsholm mansion, which is on the NRHP.
Emeryville Crescent State Marine Reserve	Park property	Alameda and Contra Costa	103.5	41.9	1985	Preserves a marsh on San Francisco Bay, managed as part of McLaughlin Eastshore State Park. Closed to the public. Unit will not become officially classified until action is also taken by the California Fish and Game Commission (ongoing since 2004).
Emma Wood State Beach	State beach	Ventura	112	45	1957	Contains a surfing beach and an estuary at the mouth of the Ventura River.
Empire Mine State Historic Park	State historic park	Nevada	853	345	1975	Offers tours of an underground gold mine which operated from 1850 to 1956, plus its surface surroundings. The mine is on the NRHP.
Estero Bluffs State Park	State park	San Luis Obispo	353	143	2000	Preserves diverse coastal habitats on Estero Bay.
Folsom Lake State Recreation Area	State recreation area	El Dorado, Placer, and Sacramento	19,564	7,917	1956	Surrounds Folsom and Natoma Lakes, reservoirs on the American River.
Folsom Powerhouse State Historic Park	State historic park	Sacramento	35	14	1956	Interprets an 1895 hydroelectricity plant, now a National Historic and Historic Civil Engineering Landmark.
The Forest of Nisene Marks State Park	State park	Santa Cruz	10,223	4,137	1963	Preserves a tract of secondary forest donated by the family of former owner Nisene Marks.
Fort Humboldt State Historic Park	State historic park	Humboldt	18	7.3	1955	Situated on its commanding bluff adjacent to Humboldt Bay, park interprets relations between U.S. army (present at fort 1853–1870), Native American groups, and settlers. Site includes a logging museum and logging equipment displays.
Fort Ord Dunes State Park	State park	Monterey	980	400	2009	Reclaims coastline overlooking Monterey Bay on former property of the decommissioned Fort Ord.
Fort Ross State Historic Park	State historic park	Sonoma	3,393	1,373	1909	Interprets the partially reconstructed Fort Ross, an 1812–1841 Russian-American Company outpost that was the southernmost settlement in the Russian colonization of the Americas. The fort is a National Historic Landmark.
Fort Tejon State Historic Park	State historic park	Kern	647	262	1940	Interprets the U.S. Army fort staffed 1854–1864 to monitor the Sebastian Indian Reservation. The fort is on the NRHP.
Franks Tract State Recreation Area	State recreation area	Contra Costa	3,523	1,426	1959	Encompasses a flooded area in the Sacramento–San Joaquin River Delta accessible only by water.
Fremont Peak State Park	State park	Monterey and San Benito	162	66	1934	Provides views of the surrounding landscape from atop Fremont Peak and of the night sky from the Fremont Peak Observatory.
Garrapata State Park	State park	Monterey	2,939	1,189	1979	Preserves a largely hidden stretch of wild coast.
Gaviota State Park	State park	Santa Barbara	2,787	1,128	1953	Flanks the narrow gorge of Gaviota Creek, which funnels Sundowner winds onto the popular beach area.
George J. Hatfield State Recreation Area	State recreation area	Merced	46.5	18.8	1953	Adjoins the Merced River.
Governor's Mansion State Historic Park	State historic park	Sacramento	0.78	0.32	1903	Interprets the 1877 mansion that housed 13 of California's governors and their families from 1903 to 1967.
Gray Whale Cove State Beach	State beach	San Mateo	3.1	1.3	1966	Embraces a steep-walled cove, near the Devil's Slide, where gray whales are often seen close to shore.
Great Valley Grasslands State Park	State park	Merced	2,826	1,144	1982	Preserves a remnant of the native grasslands once extensive in the Central Valley.
Greenwood State Beach	State beach	Mendocino	47	19	1978	Features a picturesque beach in Elk and a visitor center interpreting the town's lumbering history.
Grizzly Creek Redwoods State Park	State park	Humboldt	430	170	1943	Harbors groves of coast redwoods in three separate units along the Van Duzen River.
Grover Hot Springs State Park	State park	Alpine	553	224	1959	Boasts hot springs that feed a swimming pool complex in an alpine meadow.
Half Moon Bay State Beach	State beach	San Mateo	181	73	1956	Encompasses four popular sandy beaches on Half Moon Bay.
Harmony Headlands State Park	State park	San Luis Obispo	748	303	2003	Preserves an undeveloped parcel of Pacific coast.
Harry A. Merlo State Recreation Area	State recreation area	Humboldt	955	386	1982	Offers fishing on Big Lagoon adjacent to Humboldt Lagoons State Park
Hatton Canyon	Park property	Monterey	130	53	2002	Preserves a canyon in Carmel saved from a planned freeway route. In development, not open to public.
Hearst San Simeon State Historical Monument	State historical monument	San Luis Obispo	209	85	1958	Offers tours of newspaper magnate William Randolph Hearst's opulent 115-room "Hearst Castle," designed by architect Julia Morgan between 1919 and 1947.
Hearst San Simeon State Park	State park	San Luis Obispo	2,309	934	1932	Preserves rocky coast and rare habitats like mima mounds and Monterey pine forest, as well as a 5,850-year-old Native American archaeological site.
Heber Dunes State Vehicular Recreation Area	State vehicular recreation area	Imperial	342	138	1998	Attracts ATV riders to sandy, tamarisk-dotted dunes along a former course of the Alamo River.
Hendy Woods State Park	State park	Mendocino	816	330	1958	Preserves two groves of old-growth coast redwoods in the Anderson Valley.
Henry Cowell Redwoods State Park	State park	Santa Cruz	4,623	1,871	1953	Boasts its Redwood Grove and other old-growth forest.
Henry W. Coe State Park	State park	Santa Clara and Stanislaus	89,164	36,083	1959	Encompasses a sprawling wilderness of ridges and steep canyons in the Diablo Range.
Hollister Hills State Vehicular Recreation Area	State vehicular recreation area	San Benito	6,624	2,681	1975	Offers a variety of off-roading tracks and events in the hills outside Hollister.
Humboldt Lagoons State Park	State park	Humboldt	2,256	913	1931	Protects part of the largest lagoon system in the United States, including Big Lagoon, Stone Lagoon, and Freshwater Lagoon.
Humboldt Redwoods State Park	State park	Humboldt	51,651	20,902	1921	Preserves the world's largest remaining old-growth coast redwood forest, including Stratosphere Giant, the fourth-tallest known tree.
Hungry Valley State Vehicular Recreation Area	State vehicular recreation area	Los Angeles and Ventura	18,533	7,500	1978	Offers 130 miles (210 km) of off-highway tracks, connecting to more routes in Los Padres National Forest.
Huntington State Beach	State beach	Orange	121	49	1942	Contains 2 miles (3.2 km) of wide, flat beach in the city of Huntington Beach.
Indian Grinding Rock State Historic Park	State historic park	Amador	135	55	1962	Interprets an outcrop with 1,185 mortar holes where Native Americans ground acorns into flour.
Indio Hills Palms	Park property	Riverside	5,630	2,280	1983	Harbors a profusion of California fan palms growing along the San Andreas Fault in the Indio Hills. Part of the multi-agency Coachella Valley Preserve.
Ishxenta State Park	Park property	Monterey	1,329	538	1998	Closed to the public except for tours on a limited basis
Jack London State Historic Park	State historic park	Sonoma	1,611	652	1959	Contains several structures from the ranch of author Jack London and his wife Charmian London, as well as their grave. The ranch is a National Historic Landmark. Currently managed by the Jack London Park Partners, a non-profit that takes no state funding to maintain the park.
Jedediah Smith Redwoods State Park	State park	Del Norte	10,430	4,220	1939	Honors explorer Jedediah Smith with a tract of coast redwoods along the Smith River. Part of Redwood National and State Parks.
John B. Dewitt Redwoods State Natural Reserve	State natural reserve	Humboldt	1,164	471	1929	Contains three undeveloped coast redwood groves split off from Humboldt Redwoods State Park in 2001. In development, not open to the public.
John Little State Natural Reserve	State natural reserve	Monterey	21	8.5	1953	Protects rugged cliffs on the Big Sur coast flanking the mouth of a creek.
Jug Handle State Natural Reserve	State natural reserve	Mendocino	776	314	1976	Interprets a series of marine terraces each exhibiting a different stage of ecological succession.
Julia Pfeiffer Burns State Park	State park	Monterey	3,762	1,522	1962	Stretches from the Big Sur coast up to 3,000-foot (910 m) ridges. Includes the iconic seaside McWay Falls.
Kenneth Hahn State Recreation Area	State recreation area	Los Angeles	401	162	1984	Offers urban open space in the Baldwin Hills of Los Angeles.
Kings Beach State Recreation Area	State recreation area	Placer	7.7	3.1	1974	Encompasses 700 feet (210 m) of lakefront on the north shore of Lake Tahoe.
Kruse Rhododendron State Natural Reserve	State natural reserve	Sonoma	317	128	1934	Harbors a secondary forest with spring-blooming rhododendrons adjacent to Salt Point State Park.
La Purísima Mission State Historic Park	State historic park	Santa Barbara	1,934	783	1935	Contains the 1813 La Purisima Mission, the most completely restored Spanish mission in California.
Lake Del Valle State Recreation Area	State recreation area	Alameda	3,732	1,510	1967	Surrounds Lake Del Valle, a reservoir on the Arroyo Valle managed by the East Bay Regional Park District
Lake Oroville State Recreation Area	State recreation area	Butte	29,447	11,917	1967	Surrounds Lake Oroville, a reservoir on the Feather River.
Lake Perris State Recreation Area	State recreation area	Riverside	6,675	2,701	1974	Contains the southernmost reservoir in the 701-mile (1,128 km) California State Water Project and the Ya'i Heki' Regional Indian Museum.
Lake Valley State Recreation Area	State recreation area	El Dorado	155	63	1985	Offers an 18-hole golf course in the High Sierras.
Leland Stanford Mansion State Historic Park	State historic park	Sacramento	0.88	0.36	1978	Offers tours of governor and tycoon Leland Stanford's restored 1856 mansion, now a National Historic Landmark.
Leo Carrillo State Park	State park	Los Angeles and Ventura	2,513	1,017	1953	Honors actor and conservationist Leo Carrillo with a 1.5-mile (2.4 km) beach. Part of Santa Monica Mountains National Recreation Area.
Leucadia State Beach	State beach	San Diego	10.6	4.3	1949	Comprises a small, rocky beach in Encinitas.
Lighthouse Field State Beach	State beach	Santa Cruz	38	15	1978	Features the Steamer Lane surf break and a lighthouse containing the Santa Cruz Surfing Museum.
Limekiln State Park	State park	Monterey	711	288	1994	Contains four lime kilns from an 1887 lime-smelting operation on the Big Sur coast.
Little River State Beach	State beach	Humboldt	152	62	1931	Comprises a broad open beach with dunes.
Los Angeles State Historic Park	State historic park	Los Angeles	32	13	2001	Provides urban open space on the site of an 1875 train station where many travelers first arrived in Los Angeles.
Los Encinos State Historic Park	State historic park	Los Angeles	4.7	1.9	1949	
Los Osos Oaks State Natural Reserve	State natural reserve	San Luis Obispo	85	34	1972	
MacKerricher State Park	State park	Mendocino	2,519	1,019	1949	
Mailliard Redwoods State Natural Reserve	State natural reserve	Mendocino	242	98	1945	
Malakoff Diggins State Historic Park	State historic park	Nevada	3,143	1,272	1965	Preserves the largest hydraulic mining site in California.
Malibu Creek State Park	State park	Los Angeles	8,215	3,324	1974	
Malibu Lagoon State Beach	State beach	Los Angeles	110	45	1951	
Manchester State Park	State park	Mendocino	5,272	2,134	1955	
Mandalay State Beach	State beach	Ventura	92	37	1985	
Manresa State Beach	State beach	Santa Cruz	138	56	1948	
Marconi Conference Center State Historic Park	State historic park	Marin	62	25	1976	
Marina State Beach	State Beach	Monterey	171	69	1977	
Marsh Creek State Historic Park	State historic park	Contra Costa	3,659	1,481	2012	Features Stone House of John Marsh;Park is under construction and closed to public as of 2023.
Marshall Gold Discovery State Historic Park	State historic park	El Dorado	575	233	1942	Marks the discovery of gold by James W. Marshall at Sutter's Mill in 1848, sparking the California gold rush.
Martial Cottle Park State Recreation Area	State recreation area	Santa Clara	137	55	2003	
McArthur-Burney Falls Memorial State Park	State park	Shasta	910	370	1920	
McConnell State Recreation Area	State recreation area	Merced	74	30	1949	
McGrath State Beach	State beach	Ventura	314	127	1948	
McLaughlin Eastshore State Park State Seashore	State seashore	Alameda and Contra Costa	442	179	1985	Encompasses several remnant and restored parcels along the East Bay waterfront.
Mendocino Headlands State Park	State park	Mendocino	7,709	3,120	1972	
Mendocino Woodlands State Park	State park	Mendocino	720	290	1977	
Millerton Lake State Recreation Area	State recreation area	Fresno and Madera	6,857	2,775	1957	Includes 40 miles (64 km) of shoreline on Millerton Lake and the 1867 Millerton County Courthouse.
Mono Lake Tufa State Natural Reserve	State natural reserve	Mono	55,300	22,400	1982	
Montaña de Oro State Park	State park	San Luis Obispo	10,366	4,195	1934	
Montara State Beach	State beach	San Mateo	780	320	1959	
Monterey State Historic Park	State historic park	Monterey	9.6	3.9	1916	
Monterey State Beach	State beach	Monterey	114	46	1960	
Montgomery Woods State Natural Reserve	State natural reserve	Mendocino	2,743	1,110	1947	
Moonlight State Beach	State beach	San Diego	15	6.1	1949	
Morro Bay State Park	State park	San Luis Obispo	2,783	1,126	1934	
Morro Strand State Beach	State beach	San Luis Obispo	183	74	1932	
Moss Landing State Beach	State beach	Monterey	60	24	1972	
Mount Diablo State Park	State park	Contra Costa	20,124	8,144	1931	
Mount San Jacinto State Park	State park	Riverside	13,718	5,551	1933	
Mount Tamalpais State Park	State park	Marin	6,243	2,526	1928	
Natural Bridges State Beach	State beach	Santa Cruz	62	25	1933	
Navarro River Redwoods State Park	State park	Mendocino	727	294	1928	
New Brighton State Beach	State beach	Santa Cruz	157	64	1933	
Oceano Dunes State Vehicular Recreation Area	State vehicular recreation area	San Luis Obispo	2,675	1,083	1974	
Ocotillo Wells State Vehicular Recreation Area	State vehicular recreation area	Imperial and San Diego	50,553	20,458	1976	Offers off-roading opportunities adjacent to Anza-Borrego Desert State Park.
Old Sacramento State Historic Park	State historic park	Sacramento	293	119	1967	Includes the California State Railroad Museum which celebrates the history of rail transportation in California with museum displays, 21 restored locomotives, and a heritage railway along the Sacramento River.
Old Town San Diego State Historic Park	State historic park	San Diego	29	12	1967	
Olompali State Historic Park	State historic park	Marin	700	280	1977	
Pacheco State Park	State park	Merced and Santa Clara	6,894	2,790	1995	
Pacifica State Beach	State beach	San Mateo	21	8.5	1979	
Palomar Mountain State Park	State park	San Diego	1,909	773	1932	
Pelican State Beach	State beach	Del Norte	5.2	2.1	1947	
Pescadero State Beach	State beach	San Mateo	700	280	1958	
Petaluma Adobe State Historic Park	State historic park	Sonoma	41	17	1951	
Pfeiffer Big Sur State Park	State park	Monterey	1,391	563	1933	
Picacho State Recreation Area	State recreation area	Imperial	6,759	2,735	1960	
Pigeon Point Light Station State Historic Park	State historic park	San Mateo	76	31	1981	
Pío Pico State Historic Park	State historic park	Los Angeles	5.5	2.2	1917	
Pismo State Beach	State beach	San Luis Obispo	1,412	571	1935	
Placerita Canyon State Park	State park	Los Angeles	342	138	1949	
Plumas-Eureka State Park	State park	Plumas	4,424	1,790	1959	
Point Cabrillo Light Station State Historic Park	State historic park	Mendocino	383	155	2002	
Point Dume State Beach	State beach	Los Angeles	37	15	1958	
Point Lobos State Natural Reserve	State natural reserve	Monterey	1,325	536	1933	
Point Mugu State Park	State park	Ventura	13,947	5,644	1966	
Point Sal State Beach	State beach	Santa Barbara	84	34	1948	
Point Sur State Historic Park	State historic park	Monterey	92	37	1986	Contains the still-operational 1889 Point Sur Lighthouse and a former U.S. Navy SOSUS base. The lighthouse is on the NRHP.
Pomponio State Beach	State beach	San Mateo	421	170	1960	
Portola Redwoods State Park	State park	San Mateo	2,608	1,055	1945	
Prairie City State Vehicular Recreation Area	State vehicular recreation area	Sacramento	2,786	1,127	1990	Offers open off-roading at the foot of the Sierra Nevada as well as a go-kart track and 4WD obstacle course. This unit has never been officially named and 'Prairie City' is used until official action.
Prairie Creek Redwoods State Park	State park	Humboldt	14,187	5,741	1923	
Providence Mountains State Recreation Area	State recreation area	San Bernardino	5,890	2,380	1956	Closed to the public
Railtown 1897 State Historic Park	State historic park	Tuolumne	24	9.7	1982	
Rancho San Andrés Castro Adobe	Park property	Santa Cruz	1	0.40	2002	Comprises the grand 1849 hacienda of the prominent Castro family on their Rancho San Andrés. In development, not open to public. The hacienda is on the NRHP.
Red Rock Canyon State Park	State park	Kern	25,325	10,249	1970	
Refugio State Beach	State beach	Santa Barbara	905	366	1950	
Reynolds Wayside Campground	Wayside campground	Mendocino	66	27	1966	Preserves a parcel of old-growth redwoods and Douglas fir beside U.S. Route 101. The campground was removed in 1976.
Richardson Grove State Park	State park	Humboldt	1,772	717	1922	
Rio de Los Angeles State Park State Recreation Area	State recreation area	Los Angeles	58	23	2001	
Robert H. Meyer Memorial State Beach	State beach	Los Angeles	37	15	1978	
Robert Louis Stevenson State Park	State park	Napa, Sonoma, and Lake	5,990	2,420	1949	
Robert W. Crown Memorial State Beach	State beach	Alameda	132	53	1961	
Russian Gulch State Park	State park	Mendocino	1,305	528	1933	
Saddleback Butte State Park	State park	Los Angeles	2,954	1,195	1957	
Salinas River State Beach	State beach	Monterey and Santa Cruz	281.84	114.06	1960	
Salt Point State Park	State park	Sonoma	5,684	2,300	1968	
Salton Sea State Recreation Area	State recreation area	Imperial and Riverside	16,901	6,840	1951	
Samuel P. Taylor State Park	State park	Marin	2,707	1,095	1946	
San Bruno Mountain State Park	State park	San Mateo	298	121	1980	
San Buenaventura State Beach	State beach	Ventura	110	45	1961	
San Clemente State Beach	State beach	Orange	117	47	1931	
San Elijo State Beach	State beach	San Diego	588	238	1952	
San Gregorio State Beach	State beach	San Mateo	414	168	1958	
San Juan Bautista State Historic Park	State historic park	San Benito	6.1	2.5	1933	
San Luis Reservoir State Recreation Area	State recreation area	Merced	26,036	10,536	1969	
San Onofre State Beach	State beach	San Diego	2,107	853	1971	
San Pasqual Battlefield State Historic Park	State historic park	San Diego	69	28	1918	
San Timoteo Canyon	Park property	Riverside	1,148	465	2002	
Santa Cruz Mission State Historic Park	State historic park	Santa Cruz	1.9	0.77	1959	
Santa Monica State Beach	State beach	Los Angeles	48	19	1948	
Santa Susana Pass State Historic Park	State historic park	Los Angeles	671	272	1979	
Schooner Gulch State Beach	State beach	Mendocino	54	22	1983	
Seacliff State Beach	State beach	Santa Cruz	89	36	1931	
Shasta State Historic Park	State historic park	Shasta	25	10	1937	
Silver Strand State Beach	State beach	San Diego	3,749	1,517	1932	
Silverwood Lake State Recreation Area	State recreation area	San Bernardino	2,201	891	1978	
Sinkyone Wilderness State Park	State park	Mendocino and Humboldt	7,937	3,212	1975	
Smithe Redwoods State Natural Reserve	State natural reserve	Mendocino	689	279	1963	
Sonoma State Historic Park	State historic park	Sonoma	64	26	1909	
Sonoma Coast State Park	State park	Sonoma	10,018	4,054	1934	
South Carlsbad State Beach	State beach	San Diego	118	48	1949	
South Yuba River State Park	State park	Nevada	8,720	3,530	1979	
Standish-Hickey State Recreation Area	State recreation area	Mendocino	1,021	413	1921	
State Indian Museum	State historic park	Sacramento			1914	Interprets the diverse cultures of the indigenous peoples of California.
Stone Lake	Park property	Sacramento	1,090	440	1978	
Sue-meg State Park	State park	Humboldt	652	264	1930	Formerly Patrick's Point State Park
Sugarloaf Ridge State Park	State park	Sonoma and Napa	4,416	1,787	1920	Managed by a group of Sonoma County non-profits as Team Sugarloaf with no state funding.
Sunset State Beach	State beach	Santa Cruz	302	122	1931	
Sutter Buttes State Park	State park	Sutter	1,785	722	2003	In development on the north side of the Sutter Buttes. This park has not officially been named but has been classified as a state park. The use of Sutter Buttes in the name was allowed temporarily by the California State Parks Commission in 2004. Currently no public access.
Sutter's Fort State Historic Park	State historic park	Sacramento	5.8	2.3	1914	
Tahoe State Recreation Area	State Recreation Area	Placer	62	25		Campground on Lake Tahoe
Thornton State Beach	State beach	San Mateo	58	23	1955	
Tolowa Dunes State Park	State park	Del Norte	4,399	1,780	1983	
Tomales Bay State Park	State park	Marin	2,443	989	1952	Open under National Park Service management
Tomo-Kahni State Historic Park	State historic park	Kern	560	230	1993	
Topanga State Park	State park	Los Angeles	12,666	5,126	1967	
Torrey Pines State Beach	State beach	San Diego	61	25	1952	
Torrey Pines State Natural Reserve	State natural reserve	San Diego	1,461	591	1952	
Trinidad State Beach	State beach	Humboldt	159	64	1937	
Trione-Annadel State Park	State park	Sonoma	5,092	2,061	1971	Supports a variety of day-use activities at the northern end of Sonoma Valley.
Tule Elk State Natural Reserve	State natural reserve	Kern	984	398	1932	
Turlock Lake State Recreation Area	State recreation area	Stanislaus	3,559	1,440	1950	
Twin Lakes State Beach	State beach	Santa Cruz	95	38	1955	
Van Damme State Park	State park	Mendocino	2,336	945	1932	Preserves beach, bog, and a pygmy forest on the site of a former redwood lumbering settlement. The pygmy forest is a National Natural Landmark.
Verdugo Mountains	Park property	Los Angeles	251	102	1984	
Ward Creek Project	Park property	Placer	173	70	1978	
Washoe Meadows State Park	State park	El Dorado	628	254	1985	
Wassama Round House State Historic Park	State historic park	Madera	27	11	1978	
Watts Towers of Simon Rodia State Historic Park	State historic park	Los Angeles	0.11	0.045	1978	
Weaverville Joss House State Historic Park	State historic park	Trinity	2.8	1.1	1956	
Westport-Union Landing State Beach	State beach	Mendocino	58	23	1952	
Wilder Ranch State Park	State park	Santa Cruz	8,342	3,376	1974	
Wildwood Canyon	Park property	San Bernardino	856	346	2002	In development
Will Rogers State Beach	State beach	Los Angeles	82	33	1931	
Will Rogers State Historic Park	State historic park	Los Angeles	189	76	1944	
William B. Ide Adobe State Historic Park	State historic park	Tehama	3.9	1.6	1951	
Woodland Opera House State Historic Park	State historic park	Yolo	0.26	0.11	1980	
Woodson Bridge State Recreation Area	State recreation area	Tehama	323	131	1959	
Zmudowski State Beach	State beach	Monterey and Santa Cruz	194	79	1950	

== See also ==
- California State Beaches
- List of California State Historic Parks
- Parks in California
- California Department of Parks and Recreation
