= Gerstle Cove State Marine Reserve =

Marine reserve in California

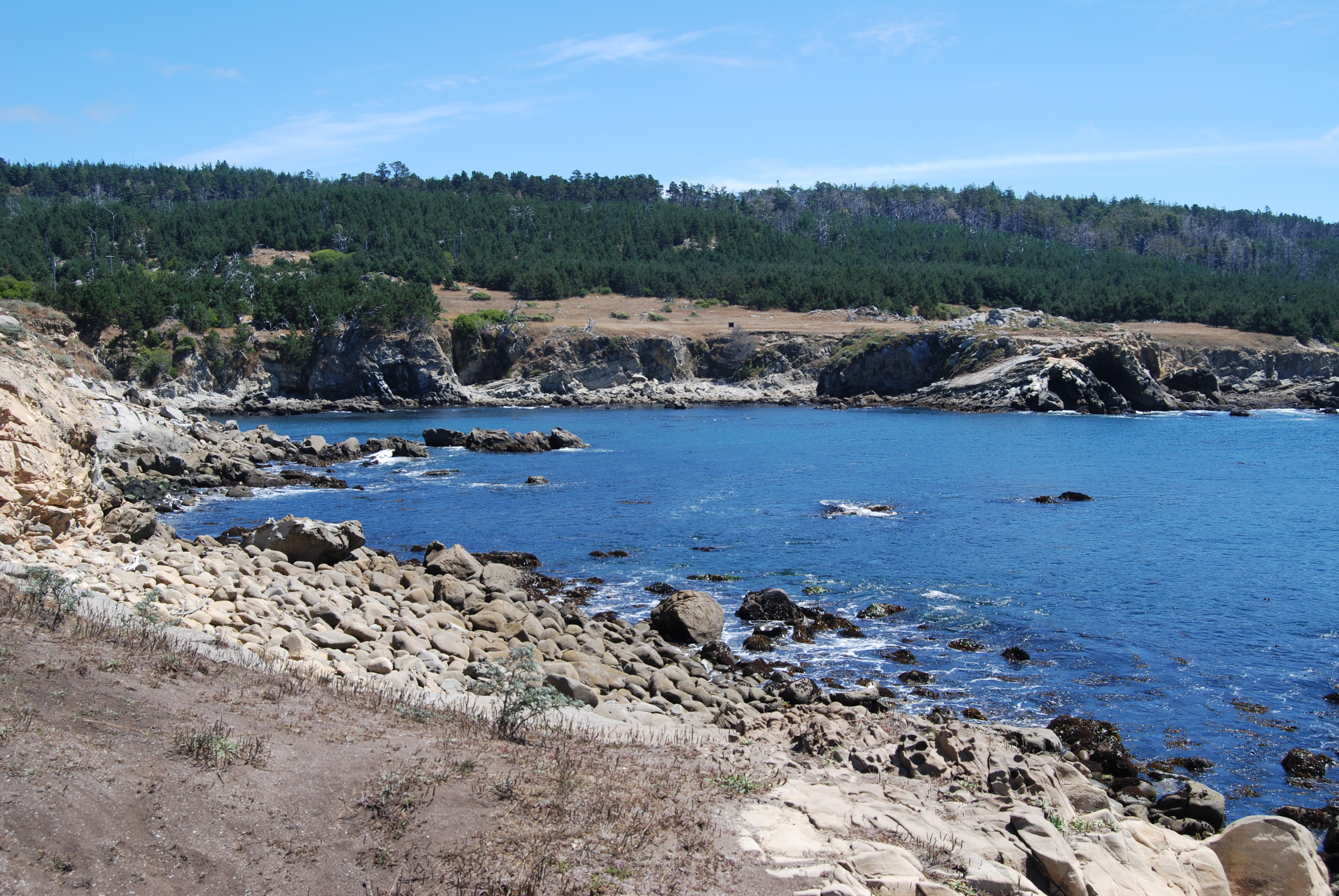
Gerstle Cove

Gerstle Cove State Marine Reserve (SMR) is a marine protected area that lies onshore from Salt Point State Park, within the Salt Point State Marine Conservation Area, in Sonoma County on California’s north central coast. The marine protected area covers 0.1 square miles. Gerstle Cove SMR prohibits the take of all living resources.

== History ==
Gerstle Cove SMR is one of 22 marine protected areas adopted by the California Department of Fish and Game in August 2009, during the second phase of the Marine Life Protection Act Initiative. The MLPAI is a collaborative public process to create a statewide network of protected areas along California's coastline.

The north central coast's new marine protected areas were designed by local divers, fishermen, conservationists and scientists who comprised the North Central Coast Regional Stakeholder Group. Their job was to design a network of protected areas that would preserve sensitive sea life and habitats while enhancing recreation, study and education opportunities.

The north central coast marine protected areas took effect on May 1, 2010.

== Geography and natural features ==
Gerstle Cove SMR lies onshore from Salt Point State Park, within the Salt Point State Marine Conservation Area in Sonoma County on California's north central coast. This SMR modifies the protections of the pre-existing underwater park at Gerstle Cove, a well-established intertidal MPA.

Gerstle Cove SMR is bounded by the mean high tide line and a straight line connecting the following points:

1. 38°33.95′N 123°19.92′W and
2. 38°33.95′N 123°19.76′W

== Habitat and wildlife ==
Gerstle Cove SMR protects intertidal habitat in an existing marine reserve that appears to be working for resident species. As part of a cluster with the larger Stewarts Point State Marine Reserve & Stewarts Point State Marine Conservation Area and Salt Point State Marine Conservation Area, Gerstle Cove will provide even more protection for a broader range of species. It also provides recreational and educational opportunities for the public, as part of an interconnected land-sea protection and management regime in waters adjacent to Salt Point State Park.

== Recreation and nearby attractions ==
Nearby Salt Point State Park features six miles of rugged coastline, free diving and SCUBA diving, 20 miles of hiking trails, pygmy forests, horseback riding and two campgrounds. Fisk Mill Cove is a day use area that offers stunning ocean views from Sentinel Rock and provides visitors with paved parking, picnic tables, small upright barbecues, restrooms, and drinking water. Stump Beach is another picnic area that also offers one of the few sandy beaches north of Jenner. Kruse Rhododendron State Natural Reserve adjoins Salt Point State Park and features hiking trails through pristine forests of Douglas fir, tanoak, grand fir and rhododendrons.

Of historical interest is nearby Fort Ross State Historic Park, the southernmost settlement in the Russian colonization of the North American continent that was established as an agricultural base to supply Alaska. It was the site of California's first windmills and shipbuilding, and Russian scientists were among the first to record California's cultural and natural history.

Gerstle Cove SMR prohibits the take of all living resources. However, California's marine protected areas encourage recreational and educational uses of the ocean. Activities such as kayaking, diving, snorkeling, and swimming are allowed unless otherwise restricted.

== Scientific monitoring ==
As specified by the Marine Life Protection Act, select marine protected areas along California's central coast are being monitored by scientists to track their effectiveness and learn more about ocean health. Similar studies in marine protected areas located off of the Santa Barbara Channel Islands have already detected gradual improvements in fish size and number.
