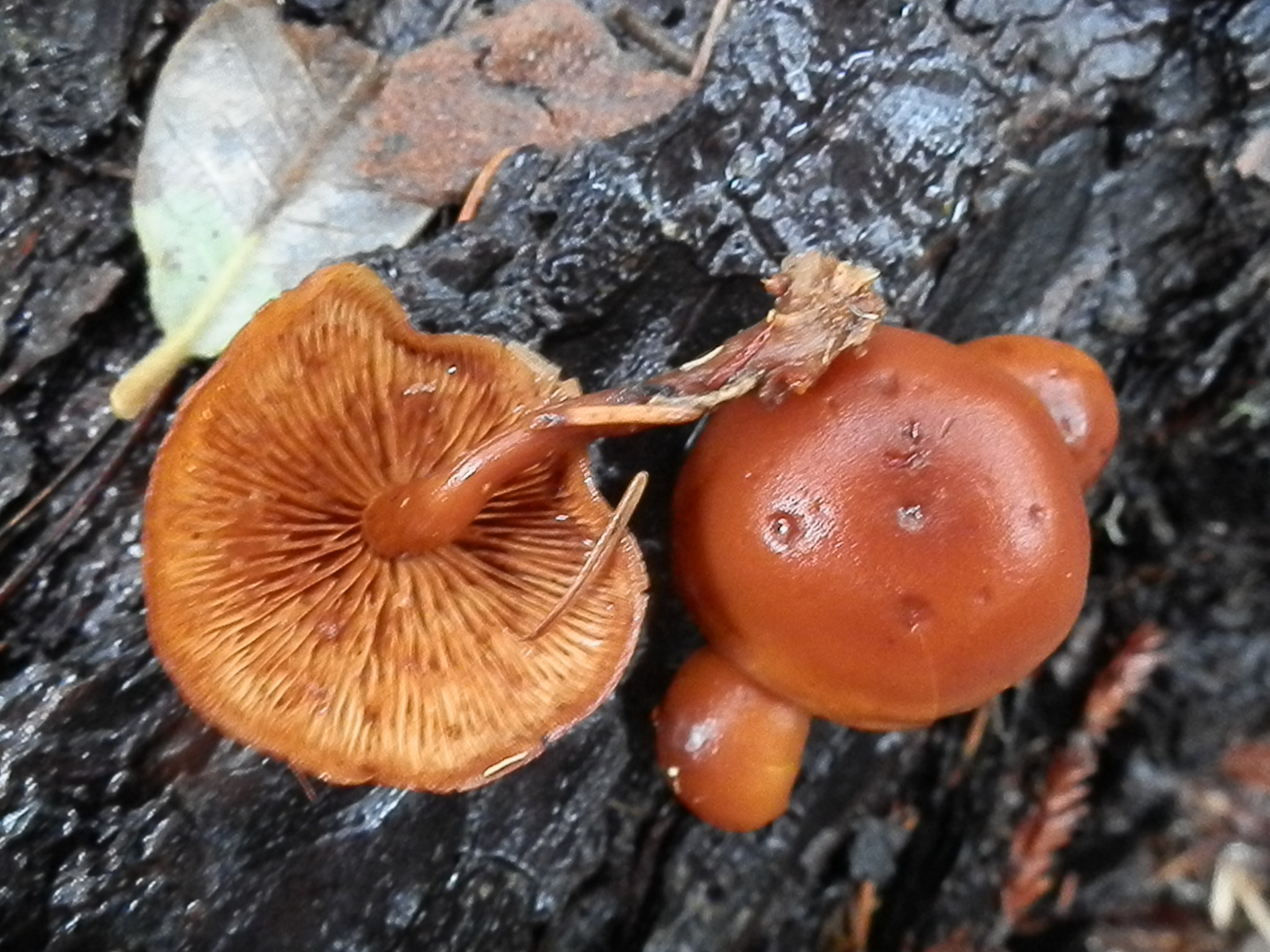
- in Salt Point State Park, California, USA

Scientific classification
- Kingdom: Fungi
- Division: Basidiomycota
- Class: Agaricomycetes
- Order: Agaricales
- Family: Hymenogastraceae
- Genus: Gymnopilus
- Species: G. croceoluteus

Binomial name
- Gymnopilus croceoluteus Hesler (1969)

= Gymnopilus croceoluteus =

Species of fungus

Gymnopilus croceoluteus Mycological characteristics
- Gills on hymenium
- Cap is convex
- Hymenium is adnexed or adnate
- Ecology is saprotrophic

Gymnopilus croceoluteus is a species of mushroom-forming fungus in the family Hymenogastraceae.

== Description ==
The cap is 3 to 8 centimetres (1.2 to 3.1 in) in diameter.

== Habitat and distribution ==
Gymnopilus croceoluteus has been found growing on coniferous wood, in Michigan (November), Florida (July), and Idaho (June).

== See also ==
- List of Gymnopilus species
