= Turlock Lake State Recreation Area =

State park in California, United States

Coordinates: 37°37′38″N 120°34′57″W

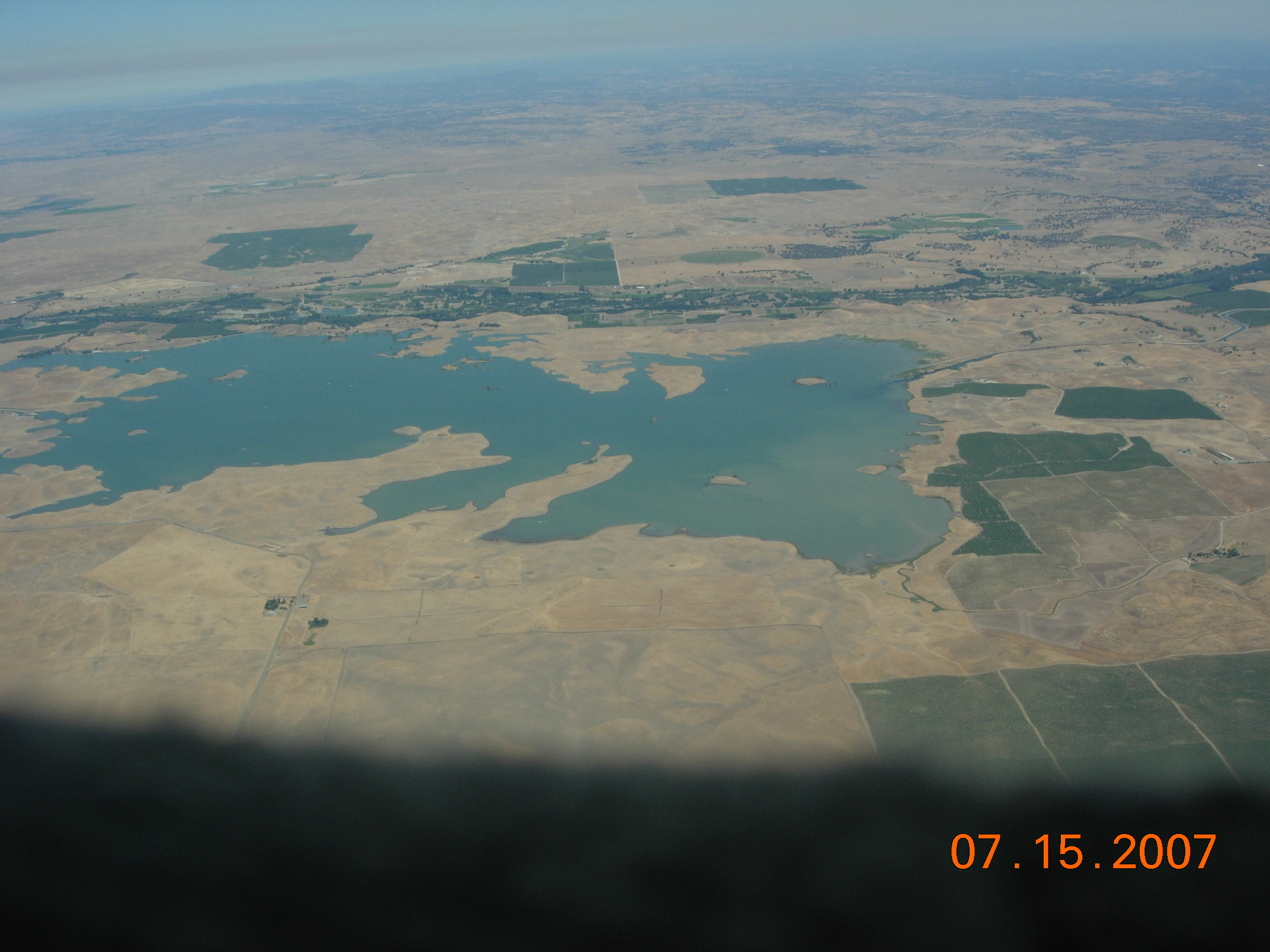
Aerial view, with Turlock Lake State Recreation Area in upper left area of reservoir

Turlock Lake State Recreation Area is a regional park and recreation area at Turlock Reservoir in Stanislaus County, central California, United States.

== Geography ==
The park is in the San Joaquin Valley foothills at 250 feet (76 m) in elevation, on the south side of the Tuolumne River and along the north shore of Turlock Lake. It is part of the California State Parks system.

It is located near La Grange, 25 miles (40 km) east of the city of Modesto, and east of U.S. Route 99 and Turlock.

The recreation area features Turlock Lake with its 26 miles (42 km) of shoreline and the surrounding foothill country leased from the Turlock Irrigation District in 1950.

== Recreation ==
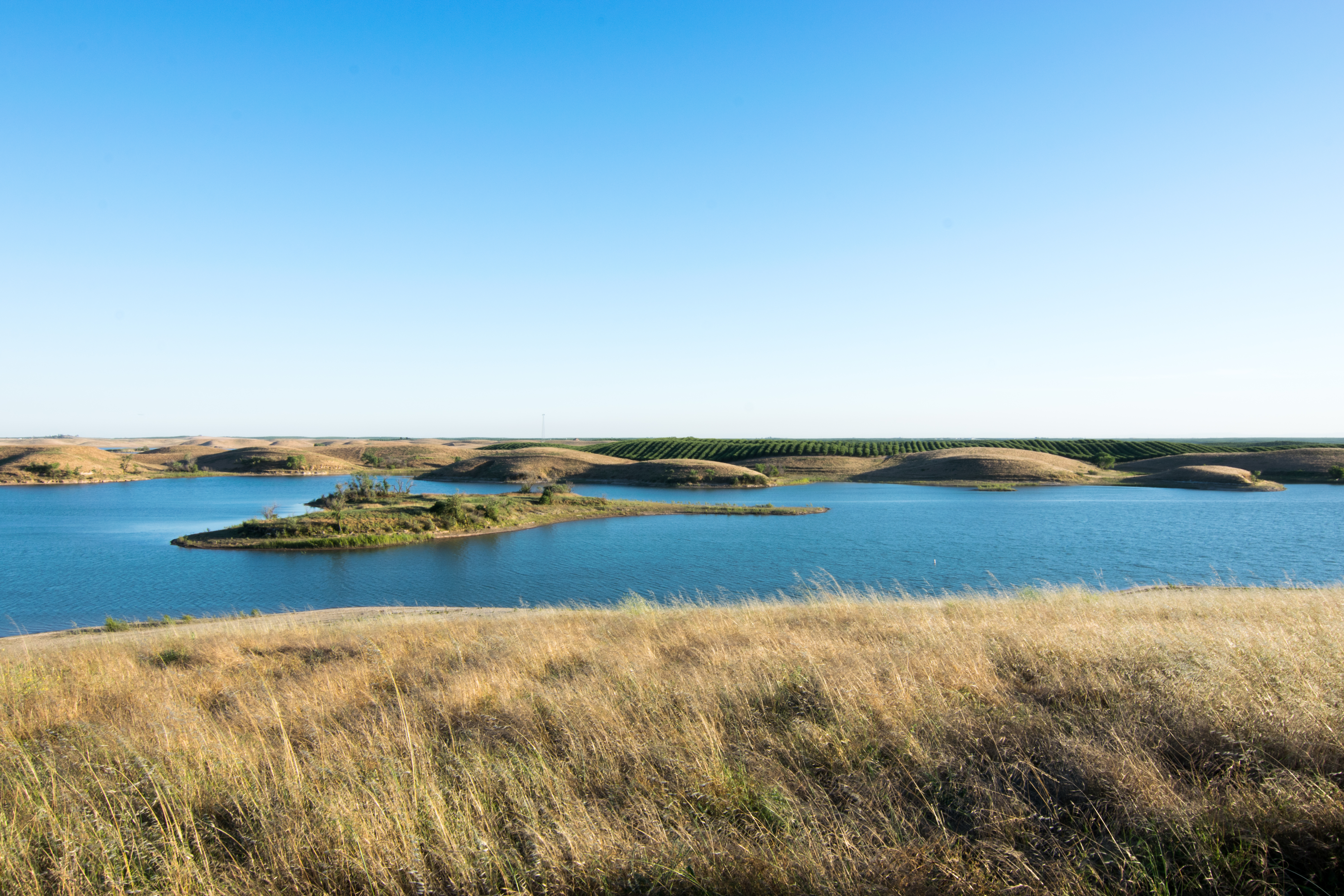
Turlock Lake at the Turlock Lake State Recreation Area

Recreation activities in the park include fishing, swimming, boating, and water skiing in Turlock Lake; picnicking; birdwatching; bicycling; hiking; and camping. There are also boat launch ramps. The day use areas are open from 8:00 AM to sunset.

The park offers visitors an example of the diverse variety of riparian zone native plants that once flourished alongside the rivers across the San Joaquin Valley.

There is a $12 day use fee to enter Turlock Lake State Recreation Area.

The campground is spread over 66 acres (27 ha), shaded by large trees along the Tuolumne River.

== See also ==
- Parks in the San Joaquin Valley
- California State Recreation Areas

=== Nearby state parks ===
- Great Valley Grasslands State Park
- George J. Hatfield State Recreation Area
- McConnell State Recreation Area
