= Leucadia =

Leucadia may refer to:

- Lefkada or Leucadia, a Greek island in the Ionian Sea
- Leucadia National, a New York City-based holding company
- Leucadia State Beach, California
- Leucadia, a district in the city of Encinitas, California
