= Burleigh H. Murray Ranch =

Property in the state park system of California

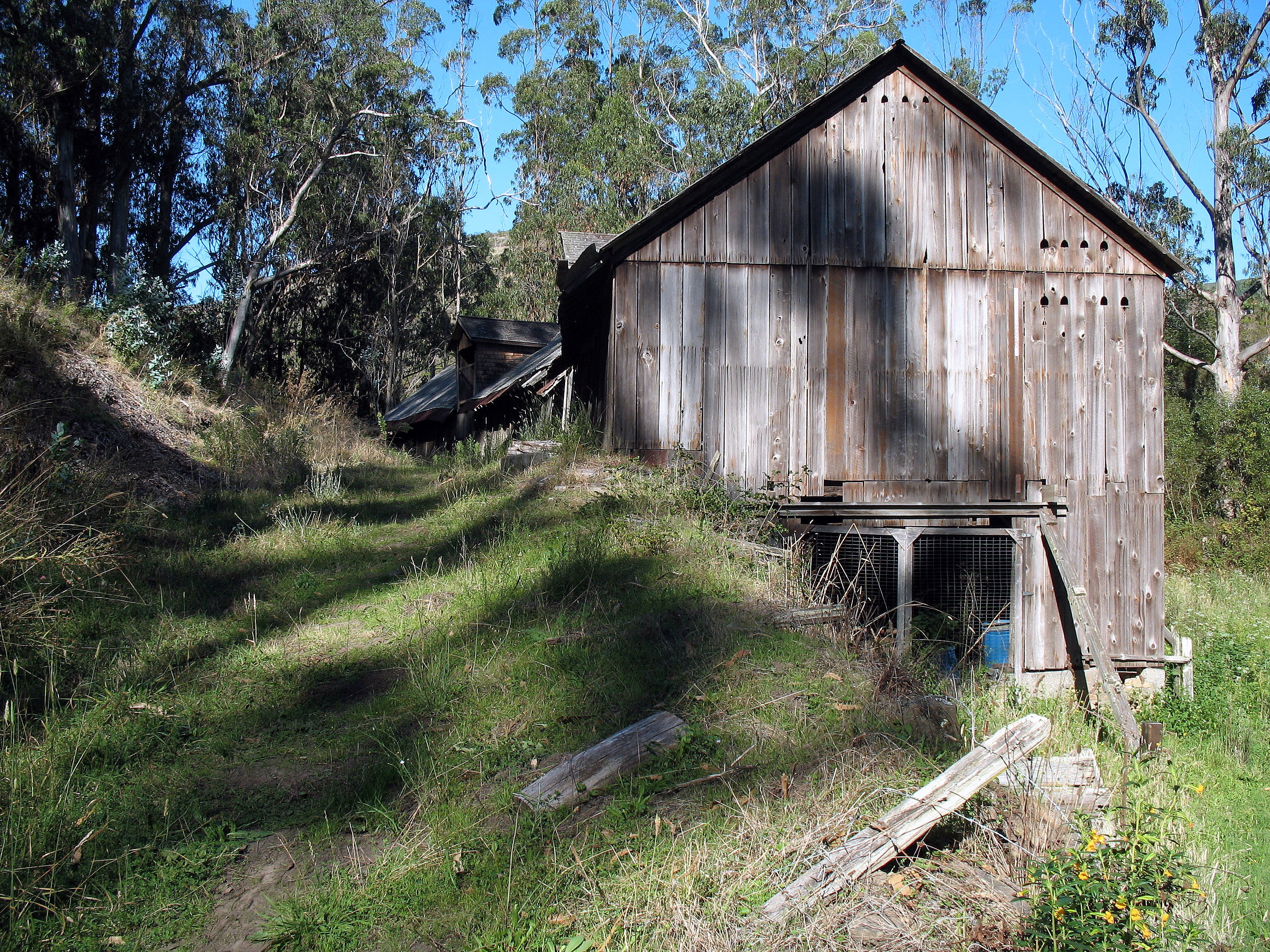
- Mills Barn

- Location within California Location within the United States
- Location: San Mateo County, California, United States
- Nearest city: Half Moon Bay, California
- Coordinates: 37°27′23″N 122°22′53″W
- Area: 1,325 acres (5.36 km^{2})
- Established: 1979
- Governing body: California Department of Parks and Recreation

Burleigh H. Murray Ranch is a property in the state park system of California in the United States. It is a valley ranch located in San Mateo County inland from Half Moon Bay. The ranch was established in 1857 and became a 1,325-acre (536 ha) park in 1979. It was purchased by the State of California in 1983.

A trail from the parking area consists of the old ranch road along Mills Creek. After a mile, it passes a 1930s bungalow that serves as a park ranger residence. The valley narrows between steep chaparral-covered hills. The terrain is navigable for another mile above the Mills Barn and water tanks, until the trail fades into the dense growth of stinging nettles, poison oak, and coyote brush.

== History ==
Burleigh H. Murray was born on the ranch July 19, 1865. His father came to California from Vermont during the California Gold Rush and worked as a miner in Auburn. In 1857, he settled on the ranch and began a successful dairy farm.

The Mills Barn, an English-style bank barn beside Mills Creek, is maintained but not restored. It is the only building of this type in California. The foundation of the barn and other buildings, including an un-reinforced arched stone bridge, rely on Italian masonry techniques dating back to Roman times. The barn was originally 200 feet (60 m) in length and could house 100 dairy cows.

== See also ==
- List of California state parks
