= Kruse Rhododendron State Natural Reserve =

Protected area in California

- IUCN category V (protected landscape/seascape)
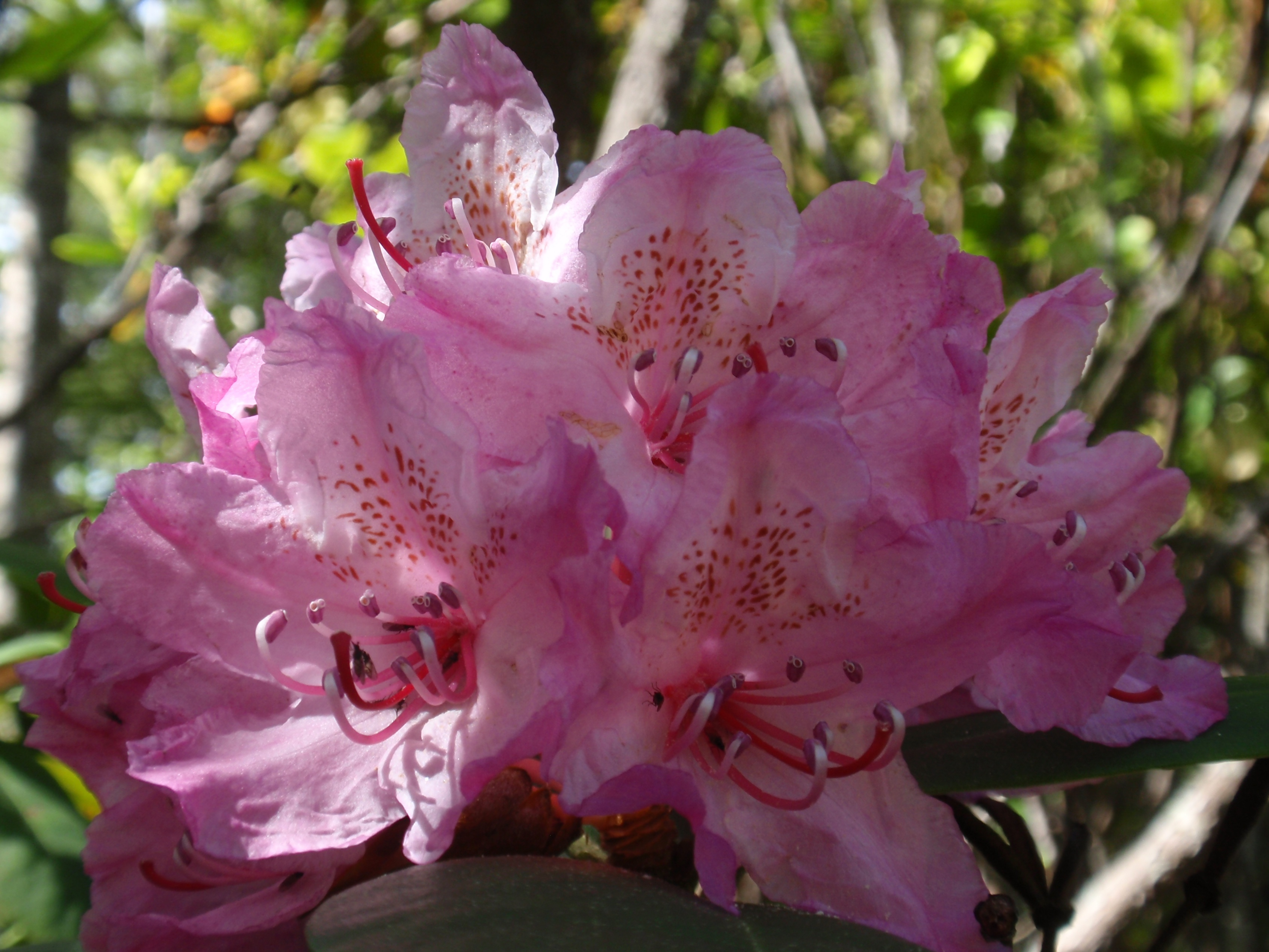
- Rhododendron blossoms on the Kruse reserve

- Location within California Location within the United States
- Location: Sonoma County, California, United States
- Nearest city: Point Arena, California
- Coordinates: 38°35′35″N 123°20′21″W
- Area: 317 acres (128 ha)
- Established: 1933
- Governing body: California Department of Parks and Recreation

Kruse Rhododendron State Natural Reserve is a protected area administered by California State Parks. It is located in northern Sonoma County approximately 400 m (1,300 ft) inland of California State Route 1 near milepost 43 on the north edge of Salt Point State Park about 20 mi (32 km) north of Jenner and 15 mi (24 km) south of Gualala. The area is a secondary forest of redwood and Douglas fir with an understory of Rhododendron macrophyllum which produces a colorful display of pink blossoms against the green forest background from mid-April to mid-June.

== History ==
The land was part of a large ranch established in 1880 to convert old-growth forest trees to lumber, collect tan oak bark for tanning leather, and raise sheep on the cleared land. Edward P. Kruse donated the land to the state of California in 1933 as a memorial to his father, who was a founder of San Francisco's German Bank. Ecological succession following a wildfire produced a rhododendron grove whose springtime blossoms became a popular tourist attraction. As tan oaks began shading out the rhododenron understory in 1979, California State Parks began a tan oak thinning program to preserve the rhododendron habitat by slowing natural succession.

== Facilities ==
Approximately 2 mi (3.2 km) of footpaths begin at a small parking lot unsuitable for buses or trailers on the unpaved one-lane Kruse Ranch Road off California Route 1. These footpaths through quiet secondary forest cross fern-covered seasonal streams in Phillips Gulch and Chinese Gulch passing clusters of rhododendron, salal, California huckleberry, and Pacific wax myrtle. The rhododendron blossoms are a springtime bonus. Funding problems have closed the pit toilets adjacent to the parking lot, but a pit toilet is available at Salt Point State Park Stump Beach parking lot approximately 1 mi (1.6 km) south on California highway 1. No bicycles or dogs are allowed on the footpaths and operation of drones is prohibited.
