= James A. Cobey =

American politician

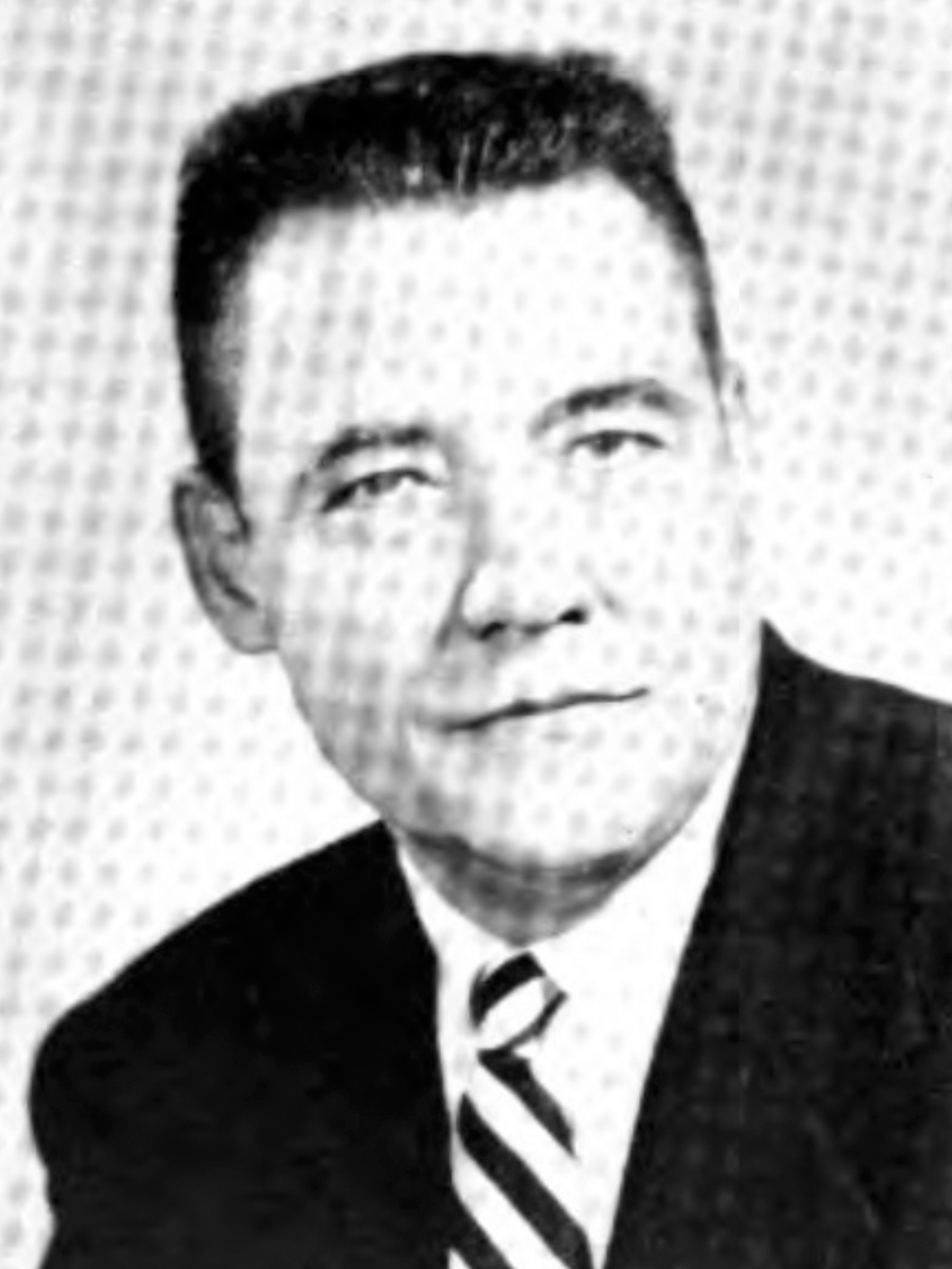

Member of the California Senate from the 24th district
- In office January 3, 1955 – January 2, 1967
- Preceded by: George J. Hatfield
- Succeeded by: Robert J. Lagomarsino

Personal details
- Born: October 3, 1913 Frostburg, Maryland, U.S.
- Died: December 30, 1993 (aged 80) Pasadena, California, U.S.
- Party: Democratic
- Spouse: Virginia Branum (m. 1942)
- Children: 3
- Education: Yale Law School; Harvard Business School

Military service
- Branch/service: United States Navy
- Battles/wars: World War II

James Alexander Cobey (October 3, 1913 – December 30, 1993) served as a State Senator in California's legislature in 1955 for 12 years as a Democrat representing Merced and Madera counties, specializing in agriculture, judicial process, fiscal legislation, water and welfare. He served in the United States Navy during World War II, and later as a State Senator, he worked closely with fellow Democrat Gov. Edmund G. (Pat) Brown in helping establish the San Luis Reservoir Project (part of the Feather River Project). After 12 years and three terms in the California Senate, Brown appointed him as an Associate Justice for the California Court of Appeal, Second Appellate District, Division 3, where he served from December 19, 1966 to December 31, 1981. In 1973, the Los Angeles Trial Lawyers Assn. named him appellate judge of the year. When Cobey later retired in 1981, he taught law at Southwestern University School of Law in Los Angeles, California teaching municipal law and water law classes.

Cobey was born in Frostburg, Maryland and was a graduate of Yale Law School and the Harvard Graduate School of Business, which was a joint program that provided him with a single diploma with both schools' seals on the top of it. On December 30, 1993, at 80 years old, Cobey died in his home after suffering an extended illness.
