= Smithe Redwoods State Natural Reserve =

State natural reserve in Humboldt County, California, United States

- Location within California
- Location: Mendocino County, California, US
- Coordinates: 39°53′48″N 123°45′08″W
- Created: 1963
- Operator: California Department of Parks and Recreation

Smithe Redwoods State Natural Reserve is a California state park in Mendocino County. In the early 20th century, the site was purchased by Mulford Miller and W. A. S. Foster, before passing into the hands of W. S. Ware and Lester Goble in 1940. Originally a site known as Lane's Redwood Flat, the area contained cabins, a store, a post office, and a bus stop during that incarnation. In 1963, the site was proposed to be sold to a logging company, but instead entered the jurisdiction of the California Department of Parks and Recreation. The South Fork Eel River passes through the park, which contains a waterfall, as well as sites for recreation on the river and picnicking.

== History ==
In 1946, the Ukiah Republican Press reported that Lane's Redwood Flat had originally been purchased by Mulford Miller and W. A. S. Foster about thirty years earlier. W. S. Ware and Lester Goble purchased the site in 1940 for $135,000. The site consisted of a grove of 2,000-year-old redwood trees. At that time, it covered 40 acres (16 ha) and contained a post office, a store, and a bus stop, as well as cabins. WPA crews cut down seven redwood trees at the site in 1936 while widening a road.

By 1963, the site was threatened with being sold for logging. A legislative bill was created in the California State Legislature to attempt to get the state to purchase the site, as the Save the Redwoods League and California State Parks had been unable to purchase the site. The owner of Lane's Redwood Flat, Lawrence Hinsom, was asking at least $200,000 for the site. Mrs. W. W. Stout, from Marin County, California, pledged $100,000 to the purchase of the site if the purchase price did not exceed $200,000 and conditional on the removal of the old resort buildings.

The site was acquired by the state government in 1963, when the bill to provide funding to save the site was approved as part of the state budget. The bill provided for $500,000 for the purchase of both Lane's Redwood Flat and other redwood groves; Stout did donate the $100,000. The location became known as Smithe Redwoods State Natural Reserve. Access was provided by U.S. Highway 101. While the site was reported to occupy 450 acres (180 ha) in news reports about the state's attempt to purchase the site, the area acquired by the state for the park was 460 acres (190 ha). A 1981 report noted it included 4,240 feet (1,290 m) of river frontage on the South Fork Eel River. Plants at the site included coast redwoods, Douglas fir, madrone, California laurel, yew, red alder, black oak, Oregon ash, ponderosa pine, giant chinquapin, and willow.

Chainsaw vandalism to three of the redwood trees in 1978 required the California Department of Parks and Recreation to contract for removal of the trees, as they were close to the highway and presented a risk to traffic if they fell. By the 2016/2017 State of California fiscal year, the park had expanded to 689 acres (279 ha) of land and 6,640 feet (2,020 m) of riverfront. At that time, there were no campsites or trails at the site. As of 2021, the Smithe Redwoods park was still operated by the California state government. The site includes a waterfall, picnic area, and recreation on the South Fork Eel River.
