= Brannan Island State Recreation Area =

State park unit of California, United States

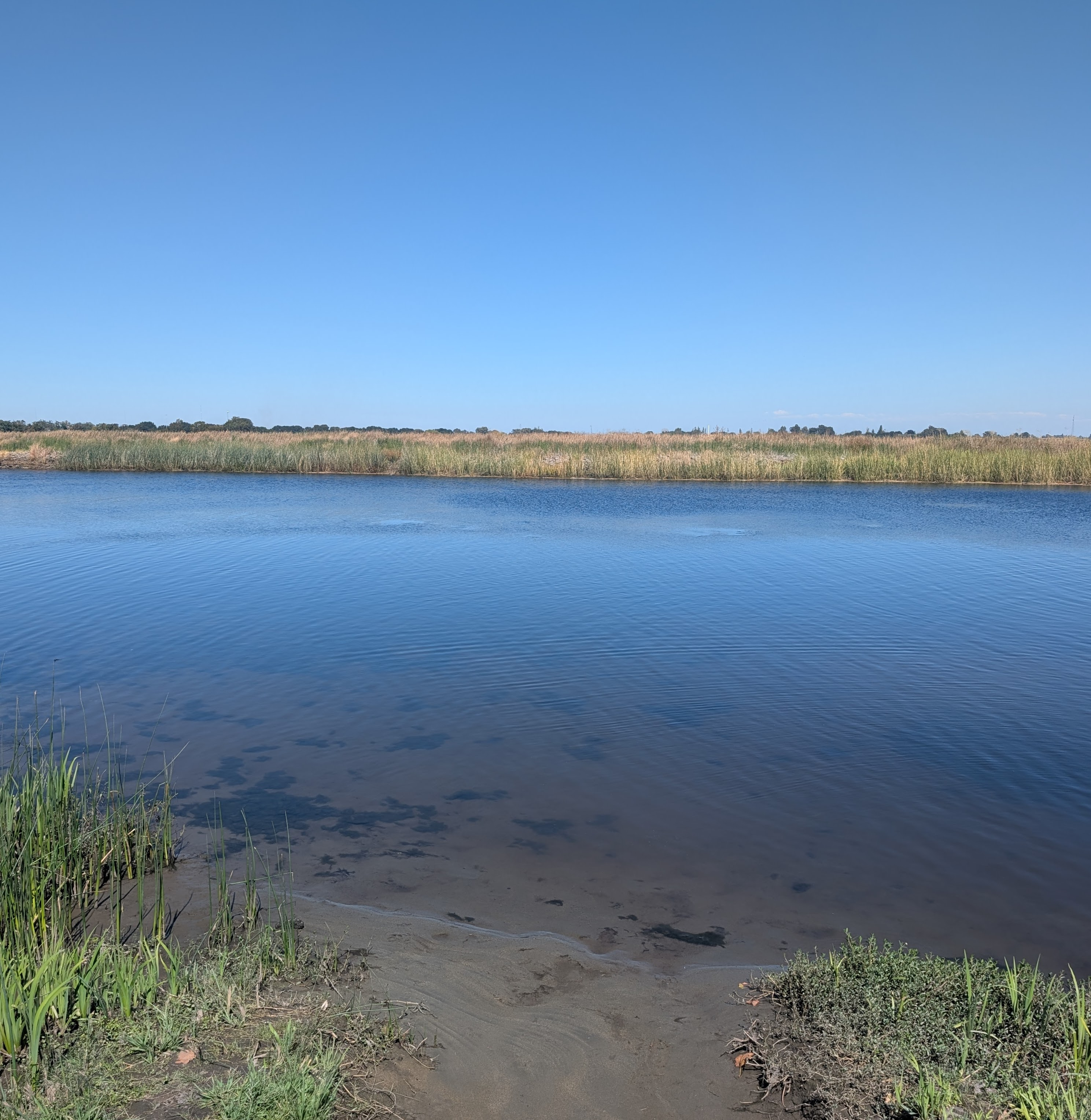
- Seven Mile Slough

- Location within California Location within the United States
- Location: Sacramento County, California, United States
- Nearest city: Rio Vista, California
- Coordinates: 38°6′53″N 121°41′29″W
- Area: 329 acres (133 ha)
- Established: 1952
- Governing body: California Department of Parks and Recreation

Brannan Island State Recreation Area is a state park unit of California, United States, preserving a maze of waterways in the Sacramento–San Joaquin River Delta. The recreation area is located in Sacramento County between Rio Vista and Isleton. This park northeast of San Francisco Bay has countless islands and marshes with many wildlife habitats and many opportunities for recreation, including boating, windsurfing and swimming. The 329-acre (133 ha) park was established in 1952.

The area offers fishing, including striped bass, sturgeon, catfish, bluegill, perch and bullhead. Southeast, accessed by the San Joaquin River, Frank’s Tract, a protected wetland marsh, is home to beaver, muskrat, river otter, mink and 76 species of birds. Another wetland also managed by Brannan Island's Park Rangers is Delta Meadows River Park near the town of Locke. Canoe tours of 'the meadows' may be reserved on weekends during the spring and fall season through Brannan Island SRA.

Brannan Island SRA has a six-lane launch ramp, over 140 campsites and areas for picnicking and swimming.

The visitor center is open weekends and by arrangement. Inside are displays on the cultural and natural history of the Delta, including a large interactive map of the San Francisco Bay Area and Delta.

Day use areas include the Windy Cove windsurfing access, the group picnic area located at the Ramadas, and Seven Mile Slough picnic area. The group picnic facility and Seven Mile Slough day use area close at sunset. Windy Cove closes at the hour posted at the entrance road to Windy Cove.

Seven Mile Slough picnic area includes picnic tables, barbecues and drinking water. New restroom facilities were completed late in 1997 and include flush toilets and outdoor cold showers. Seven Mile Slough's swim beach has lifeguards from Memorial Day through Labor Day. Ample parking is close to the beach.

The Ramadas have shaded picnic structures with large barbecues, picnic tables, water and trash receptacles. A large open grassy area is adjacent to the site for games. The closest restroom to the Ramadas is located north of the swim beach along Seven Mile Slough.

The climate in the Delta is mild, with winter temperatures usually ranging between 45 and 55 degrees and summer temperatures between 75 and 95. An occasional heat wave will push the temperatures in summer to 100 degrees or more but the Delta breeze is never far away.

The park was closed starting April 1, 2022, while California State Parks sought a new operator. The park was partially reopened from June to September, 2022, and fully reopened December 1, 2022, operated by Park Delta Bay, a nearby resort.

== See also ==
- List of California state parks
