= Delta Meadows River Park =

State park property of California

Delta Meadows
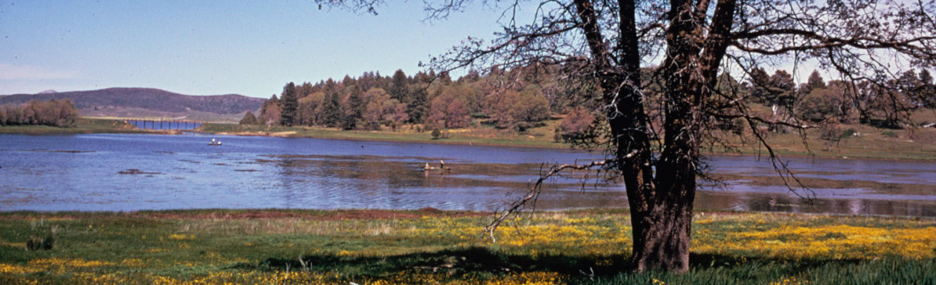
- Waterfront of Delta Meadows River Park

- Location within California Location within the United States
- Location: Sacramento County, California, United States
- Nearest city: Walnut Grove, California
- Coordinates: 38°15′31″N 121°30′6″W
- Area: 472 acres (191 ha)
- Established: 1985
- Governing body: California Department of Parks and Recreation

Delta Meadows River Park (DMRP) is a state park property of California, United States, preserving an undeveloped piece of the Sacramento–San Joaquin River Delta. At present it is open to the public for walking, fishing and boating but has no visitor services. The park encompasses sloughs, wet meadows, and an island between the Sacramento and Mokelumne Rivers. It is located near the historic Chinese American town of Locke, 28 miles (45 km) equidistant from Sacramento and Stockton. The 472-acre (191 ha) property was established in 1985.

== Wildlife ==
Delta Meadows preserves a river delta much as it appeared 150 years ago, crowded with stands of oak, tule, walnut, willow, and cottonwood. Abundant wildlife includes black-tailed deer, beavers, river otters, muskrats, and wetland birds such as great blue herons, wood ducks, mallards, belted kingfishers, and cormorants.

== Access ==
Delta Meadows is primarily accessible by boat. However one can drive onto Railroad Slough Levee from the River Road between Walnut Grove and Locke, via a small gravel road just north-east of the cross channel. Previously a docent program through the Delta Natural History Association provided canoe guides in the spring and fall, reserved through Brannan Island State Recreation Area.

== See also ==
- List of California state parks
