= George J. Hatfield =

American politician (1887–1953)

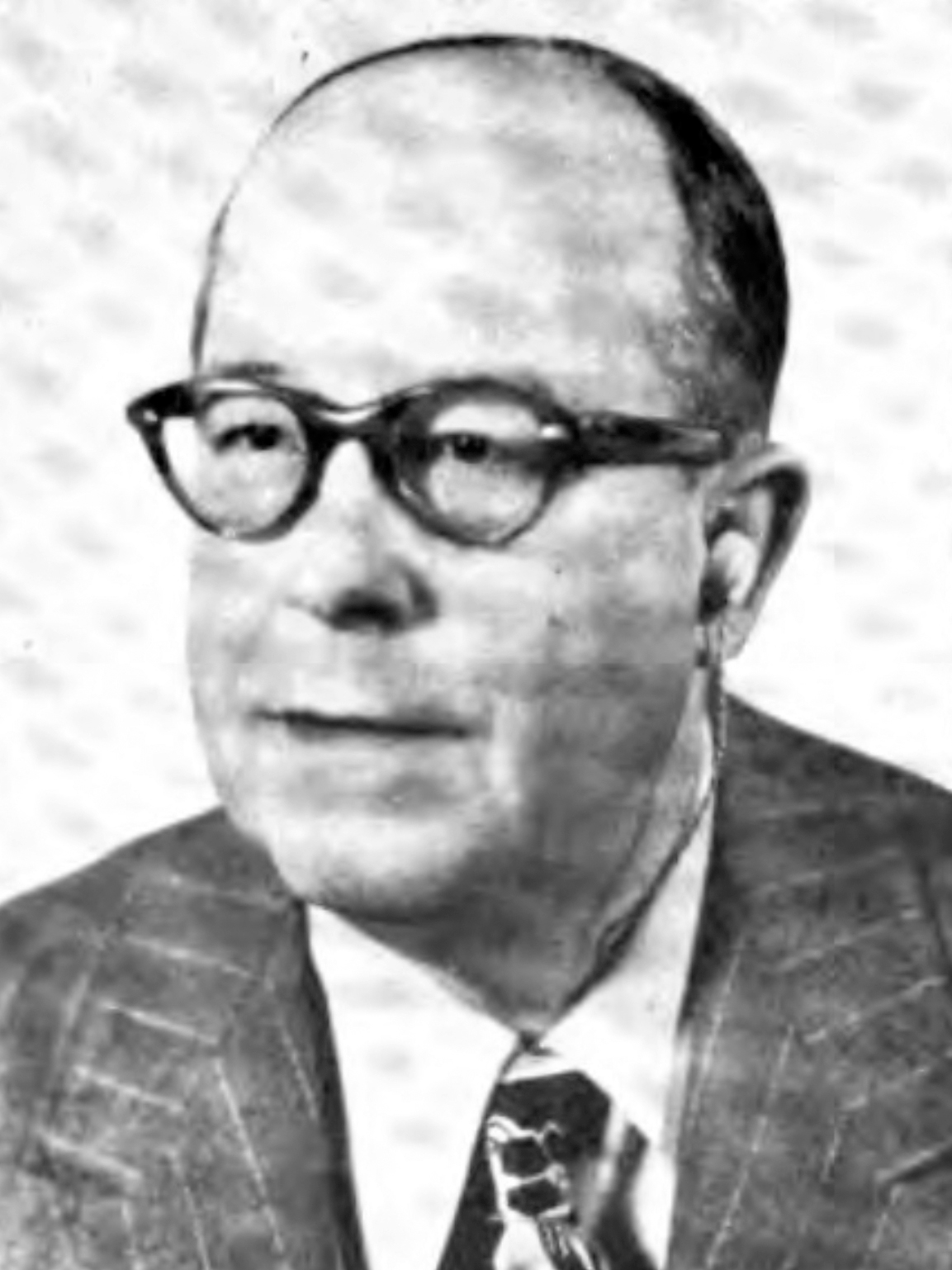

Member of the California Senate from the 24th district
- In office January 4, 1943 – November 15, 1953
- Preceded by: Peter P. Myhand
- Succeeded by: James A. Cobey

32nd Lieutenant Governor of California
- In office January 8, 1935 – January 2, 1939
- Governor: Frank Merriam
- Preceded by: Frank Merriam
- Succeeded by: Ellis E. Patterson

Personal details
- Born: October 29, 1887 Waterloo, Ontario, Canada
- Died: November 15, 1953 (aged 66) Palo Alto, California, U.S.
- Party: Republican
- Spouse: Judith Barlow Hogan (m. 1917)
- Children: 3
- Education: Stanford University

Military service
- Branch/service: United States Army; United States Navy
- Battles/wars: World War I

George Juan Hatfield (October 29, 1887 – November 15, 1953) served as U.S. Attorney for the Northern District of California from 1925–33 and was the 32nd lieutenant governor of California from 1935 to 1939 serving under Governor Frank Merriam. In 1953, Hatfield donated land for the George J. Hatfield State Recreation Area, located near Turlock. There was also a bridge named the "George J. Hatfield Bridge" which was located along Route 165 at the San Joaquin River in Merced County.

In 1917, Hatfield married Judith Barlow Hogan. Together they had three children: Janine Snyder, Mary Elizabeth Gracier, and Georgette Judith Kelley. Hatfield graduated from Stanford University and received his doctor degree of jurisprudence.

Hatfield served in the United States Army in World War I and also in United States Navy. From 1922 to around 1950, Hatfield was a member of the Republican State Central Committee. From 1923 to 1927, he was an active member of the California Veterans Welfare Board. From 1925 to 1933, Hatfield was the U.S. Attorney for Northern California. Hatfield Served in the California State Senate from 1943 until his death in 1953.

Political offices
Preceded by Frank Merriam	Lieutenant Governor of California; 1935–1939	Succeeded by Ellis E. Patterson
