= Bidwell–Sacramento River State Park =

Park in Glenn County, California, United States of America

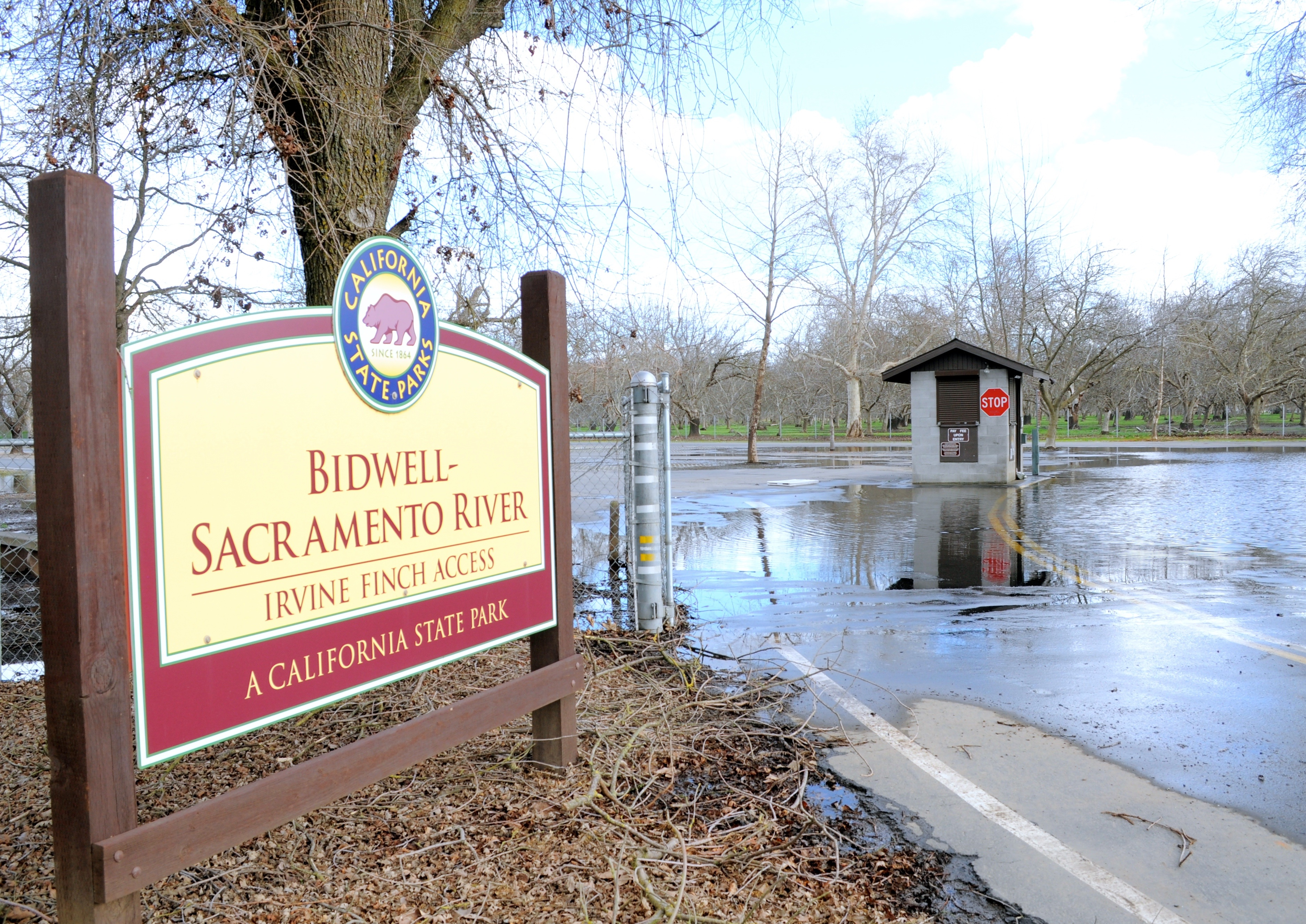
- Bidwell–Sacramento River State Park entrance sign

- Location within California Location within the United States
- Location: Butte and Glenn Counties, California, United States
- Nearest city: Chico, California
- Coordinates: 39°42′18″N 121°56′24″W
- Area: 349 acres (141 ha)
- Established: 1979
- Governing body: California Department of Parks and Recreation

Bidwell–Sacramento River State Park is a state park of California, United States, preserving riparian habitat on the Sacramento River and its tributary Big Chico Creek. The park is located on the border of Butte County and Glenn County. Common activities include fishing for salmon, steelhead and shad; and floating the river on inner tubes, canoes or kayaks. The 349-acre (141 ha) property was established as a state park in 1979.

The park's riparian habitat is an example of a disappearing natural resource. The riparian plant and animal communities depend on each other. Large oaks and cottonwoods give the shade needed for the survival of cool-water creatures. Thick understories of elderberry, wild grape, blackberry, wild rose and perennials provide shelter to a diverse wildlife population.

== Day use areas ==
Indian Fishery Day Use Area is an oxbow lake surrounded by oak woodland. This area is used for picnicking, bird watching, fishing, and hiking. It is common to observe river otters in the water, to see turtles or to spot herons feeding.

Big Chico Creek Day Use Area is characterized by a river habitat that opens up to a large gravel bar that fronts the Sacramento River. Here park visitors fish, swim, jet ski, water ski and sun bathe. This is also the location that many river rafts and tubes exit the river.

Pine Creek Day Use Area is a common location for fishing, canoeing, kayaking, picnicking and bird and wildlife watching.

Irvine Finch River Access is a 5-acre (2.0 ha) parking lot and launch ramp affording park visitors a means to access the Sacramento River for boating, canoeing or floating on inner tubes.

== See also ==
- List of California state parks
