= Washoe Meadows State Park =

California state park

- Location within California Location within the United States
- Location: El Dorado County, California, United States
- Nearest city: South Lake Tahoe, California
- Coordinates: 38.8687°N 120.0234°W
- Area: 861 acres (348 ha)
- Established: 1984
- Governing body: California Department of Parks and Recreation
- Website: www.parks.ca.gov?page_id=516

Washoe Meadows State Park is a state park in California, consisting of more than 600 acres (240 ha) of woodlands and meadows. It is located south of Lake Tahoe in El Dorado County.

== History ==
Washoe Meadows State Park was established in 1984 to prevent the expansion of the Lake Tahoe Golf Course across the Truckee River, and was named after the local Washoe people. In 2018, parts of the park were used alongside nearby South Lake Tahoe Airport as filming locations for Top Gun: Maverick. In 2023, Washoe Meadows was one of 12 California state parks subject to a memorandum of understanding between the California Department of Parks & Recreation and the Washoe Tribe of Nevada focused on cooperation and tribal access.

Bird spotters noticed sandhill cranes nesting here in 2023 along with other sites around Lake Tahoe.
