= Salt Point State Marine Conservation Area =

Marine protected area in California

- Location: California
- Governing body: California Department of Fish and Wildlife

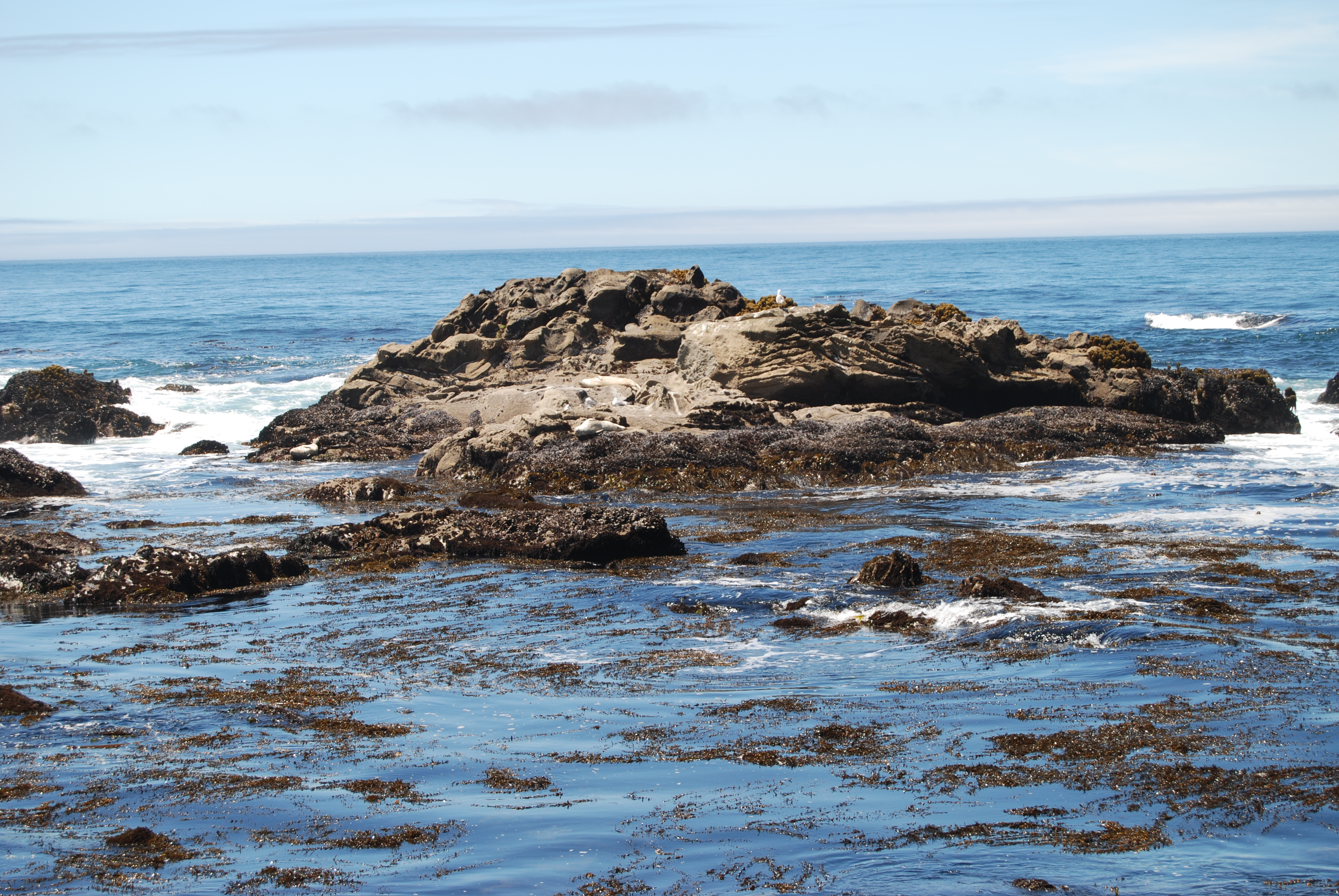
Salt Point State Park

Salt Point State Marine Conservation Area (SMCA) is a marine protected area that lies onshore from Fisk Mill Cove and south along Salt Point State Park in Sonoma County on California's north central coast. The marine protected area covers 3.12 square miles (8.1 km^{2}). Salt Point SMCA prohibits the take of all living marine resources, except the recreational take of abalone and finfish.

== History ==
Salt Point SMCA is one of 22 marine protected areas adopted by the California Department of Fish and Game in August 2009, during the second phase of the Marine Life Protection Act Initiative. The MLPAI is a collaborative public process to create a statewide network of protected areas along California's coastline.

The north central coast's new marine protected areas were designed by local divers, fishermen, conservationists and scientists who comprised the North Central Coast Regional Stakeholder Group. Their job was to design a network of protected areas that would preserve sensitive sea life and habitats while enhancing recreation, study and education opportunities.

The north central coast marine protected areas took effect May 1, 2010.

== Geography and natural features ==
Salt Point SMCA is a marine protected area that lies onshore from Fisk Mill Cove and south along Salt Point State Park in Sonoma County on California's north central coast. Salt Point SMCA adjoins Stewarts Point State Marine Reserve at its southern boundary.

Salt Point SMCA is bounded by the mean high tide line and straight lines connecting the following points in the order listed:

1. 38°35.6′N 123°20.8′W
2. 38°35.6′N 123°21.0′W
3. 38°33.5′N 123°21.0′W and
4. 38°33.5′N 123°18.91′W, except that Gerstle Cove is excluded.

== Habitat and wildlife ==
Salt Point SMCA protects a complex rocky habitat which includes coves, kelp, wash rocks, shelves, walls, cobble and boulders as well as associated species like red abalone, red urchin and rockfish. Bull kelp thrives along this area and can grow up to ten inches per day as it reaches for sunlight at the ocean's surface.

The SMCA provides continuous land-sea protection and management in waters adjacent to Salt Point State Park, protecting diverse habitats in a highly scenic and relatively remote area for both consumptive and non-consumptive recreational purposes.

== Recreation and nearby attractions ==
Nearby Salt Point State Park features six miles of rugged coastline, free diving and SCUBA diving, 20 miles of hiking trails, pygmy forests, horseback riding and two campgrounds. Fisk Mill Cove is a day use area that offers stunning ocean views from Sentinel Rock and provides visitors with paved parking, picnic tables, small upright barbecues, restrooms, and drinking water. Stump Beach is another picnic area that also offers one of the few sandy beaches north of Jenner. Kruse Rhododendron State Natural Reserve adjoins Salt Point State Park and features hiking trails through pristine forests of Douglas fir, tanoak, grand fir and rhododendrons.

Of historical interest is nearby Fort Ross State Historic Park, the southernmost settlement in the Russian colonization of the North American continent that was established as an agricultural base to supply Alaska. It was the site of California's first windmills and shipbuilding, and Russian scientists were among the first to record California's cultural and natural history.

Salt Point SMCA prohibits the take of all living marine resources, except the recreational take of abalone and finfish. However, California's marine protected areas encourage recreational and educational uses of the ocean. Activities such as kayaking, diving, snorkeling, and swimming are allowed unless otherwise restricted.

== Scientific monitoring ==
As specified by the Marine Life Protection Act, select marine protected areas along California's central coast are being monitored by scientists to track their effectiveness and learn more about ocean health. Similar studies in marine protected areas located off of the Santa Barbara Channel Islands have already detected gradual improvements in fish size and number.
