= Leucadia State Beach =

State park in California, United States

Coordinates: 33°3′54″N 117°18′18″W

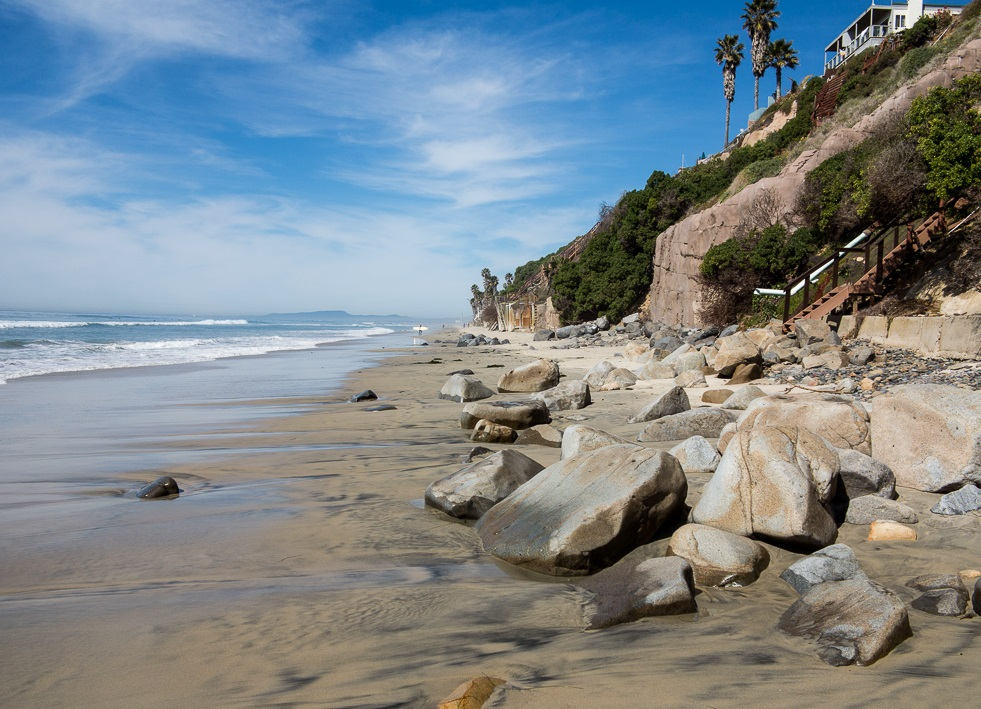

- Location within California Location within the United States
- Location: Encinitas, California
- Nearest city: Encinitas
- Area: 10.6-acre (4.3 ha)
- Established: 1949
- Governing body: California Department of Parks and Recreation

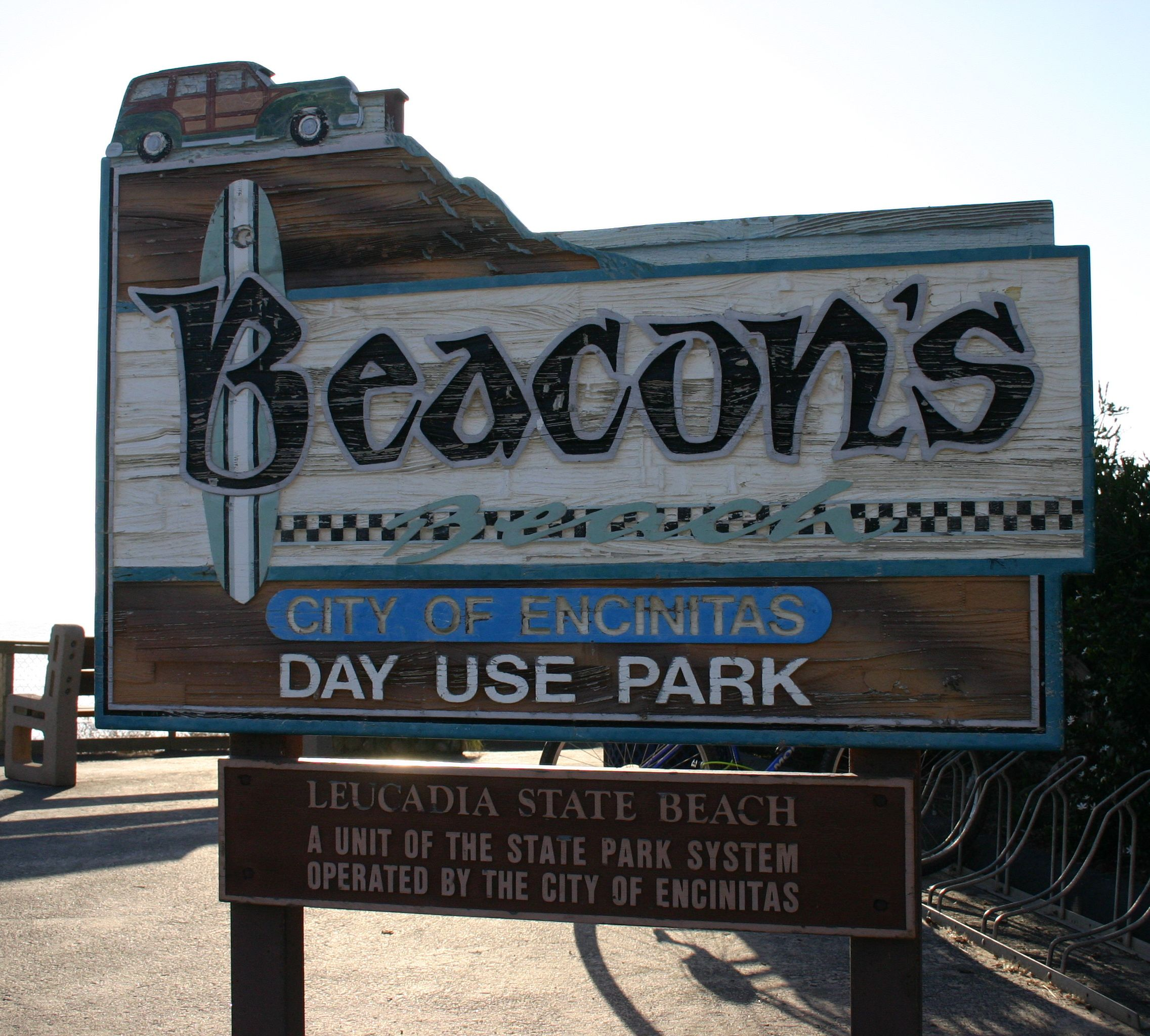
Signboard at the entrance

Leucadia State Beach, also known as Beacon's Beach, is a public beach in Encinitas, California, United States. It is operated as Beacon's Beach by the city under a 20-year agreement with the California Department of Parks and Recreation. Established in 1949, the 10.6-acre (4.3 ha) site is a popular spot for swimming, surfing, fishing, and other beach activities.

== See also ==
- List of California state parks
