= Stone Lake (California) =

Lake in Sacramento County, California

Stone Lake State Park
- Location within California Location within the United States
- Location: Sacramento County, California, United States
- Coordinates: 38°20′44″N 121°29′54″W
- Governing body: California Department of Parks and Recreation
- Website: https://www.parks.ca.gov/?page_id=493

Stone Lake is in Stone Lake State Park, a California State Park, located in Sacramento County, California. The open space property protects two rare natural Central Valley lakes and their surrounding riparian habitat and grassland areas.

The County of Sacramento operates Stone Lake.
