= George J. Hatfield State Recreation Area =

State park in Merced County, California

Coordinates: 37°21′28″N 120°57′38″W

George J. Hatfield State Recreation Area is a state park unit on the Merced River Merced County, California. It is located in the San Joaquin Valley about 20 miles (32 km) south of Modesto.

== Features ==
The park has many native riparian zone trees and is home to various wildlife, especially birds. Swimming, fishing and picnicking are popular activities.

The 46.5-acre (18.8 ha) park was established in 1953. It is named after George J. Hatfield, who donated the land to the state.

== See also ==
- List of California state parks
