= McConnell State Recreation Area =

Recreation area and state park in California

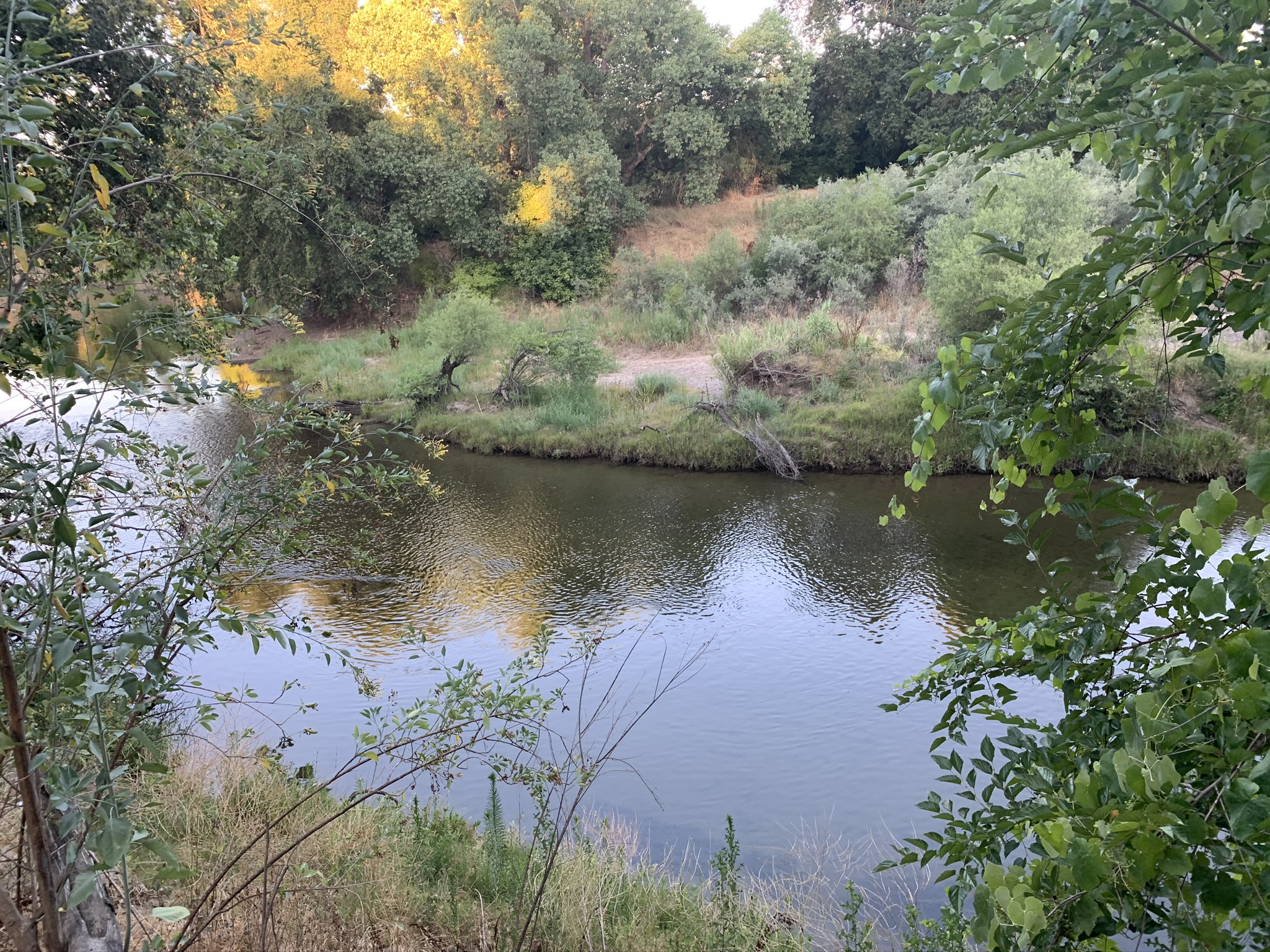
- Interactive map of McConnell State Recreation Area
- Location: Merced County, California
- Nearest city: Livingston
- Coordinates: 37.4152°N 120.7110°W
- Area: 74 acres (29.95 ha)
- Created: 1949
- Operator: State of California
- Status: Open
- Water: Merced River

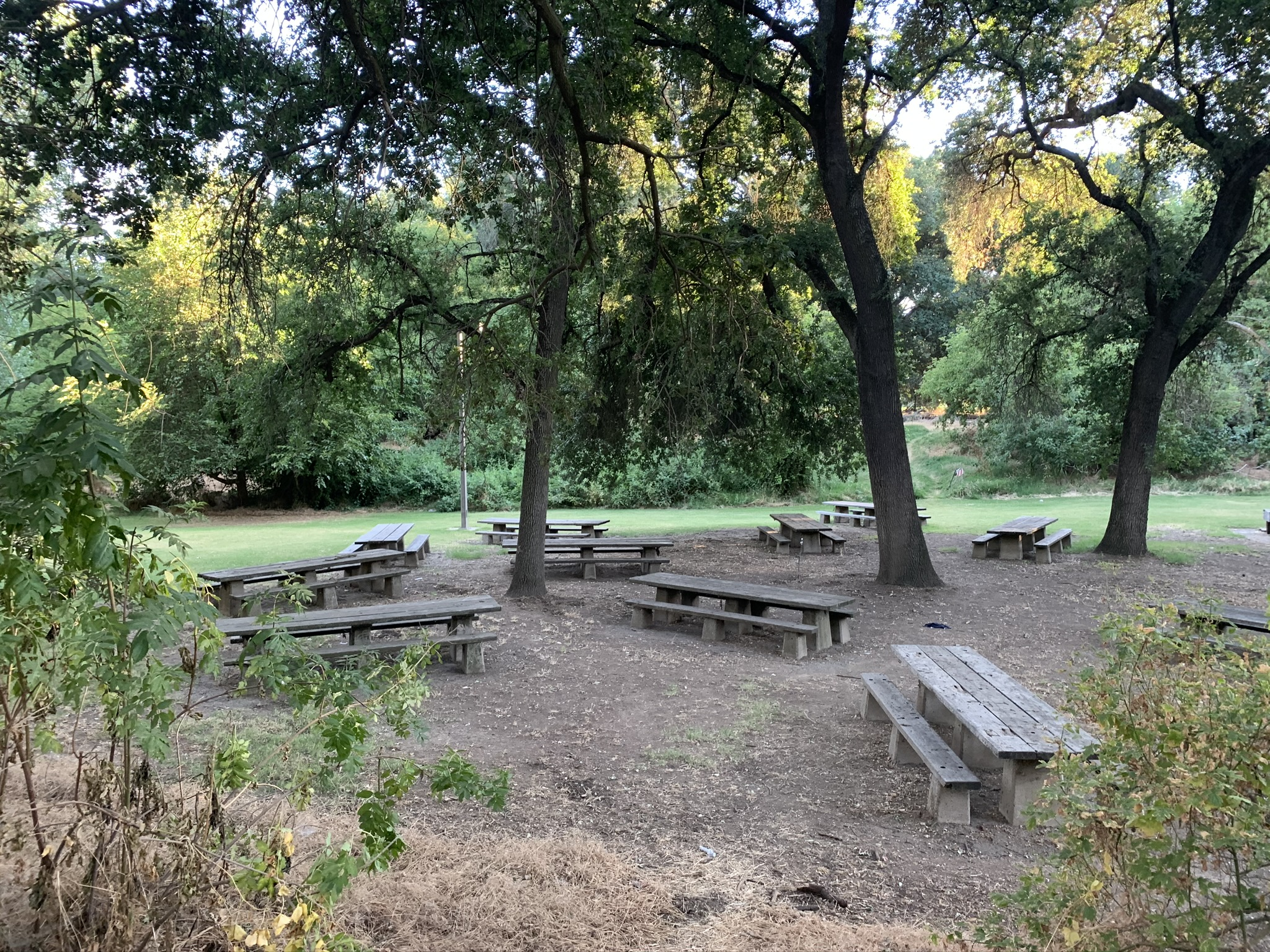
Picnic Area at McConnell State Recreation Area.

The McConnell State Recreation Area is on the banks of the Merced River, about two miles northeast of Livingston (on U.S. Route 99 between Turlock and Merced). Fishing is popular for catfish, black bass and perch. There are picnic, camping and play areas. It is named after Thomas McConnell, who homesteaded the area.

== Proposed for closure ==
The McConnell State Recreation Area was one of the 48 California state parks proposed for closure in January 2008 by California's Governor Arnold Schwarzenegger as part of a deficit reduction program.
