= John B. Dewitt Redwoods State Natural Reserve =

Natural reserve in California

John. B. Dewitt Redwoods State Natural Reserve
- Location within California
- Location: Humboldt County, California, United States
- Nearest city: Redway, California
- Coordinates: 40°07′24″N 123°50′22″W
- Area: 1,164 acres (471 ha)
- Established: 2001
- Governing body: California Department of Parks and Recreation

John B. Dewitt Redwoods State Natural Reserve is a protected area, located in Humboldt County, California, near the town of Redway, California and next to the South Fork Eel River. The 1,164-acre (4.71 km^{2}) reserve is a sanctuary for old-growth Coast Redwood trees and features three groves: Holbrook, Whittemore, and O'Meara. The natural reserve includes O'Meara Grove, the only old–growth redwood grove with a residential neighborhood.

== History ==
The area that currently makes up the reserve, was originally included within the Humboldt Redwoods State Park but separated off in 2001. The reserve was named after John Belton Dewitt, a conservationist and former director of the Save the Redwoods League.

In 2022 a $3.9 million dollar grant was awarded by the California Department of Forestry and Fire Protection (CALFIRE) to Redwood Community Action Agency for the Redway Forest Health Project. The majority of the project took place on the Dewitt reserve, and focused on the removal of unnaturally heavy fuel loading. The project was completed in 2022.
