= Stewarts Point State Marine Reserve & Stewarts Point State Marine Conservation Area =

Marine protected area in California

Stewarts Point State Marine Reserve (SMR) and Stewarts Point State Marine Conservation Area (SMCA) are two adjoining marine protected areas that extend offshore from about a mile south of Black Point to Fisk Mill Cove, in Sonoma County on California’s north central coast. The marine protected areas cover 25.22 square miles (65.3 km^{2}). Stewarts Point SMR prohibits the take of all living marine resources. Stewarts Point SMCA prohibits the take of all living marine resources, except recreational shore based take of marine aquatic plants (other than sea palm), marine invertebrates, finfish by hook and line, surf smelt by beach net, and species authorized by Title 14 Section 28.80 by hand-held dip net.

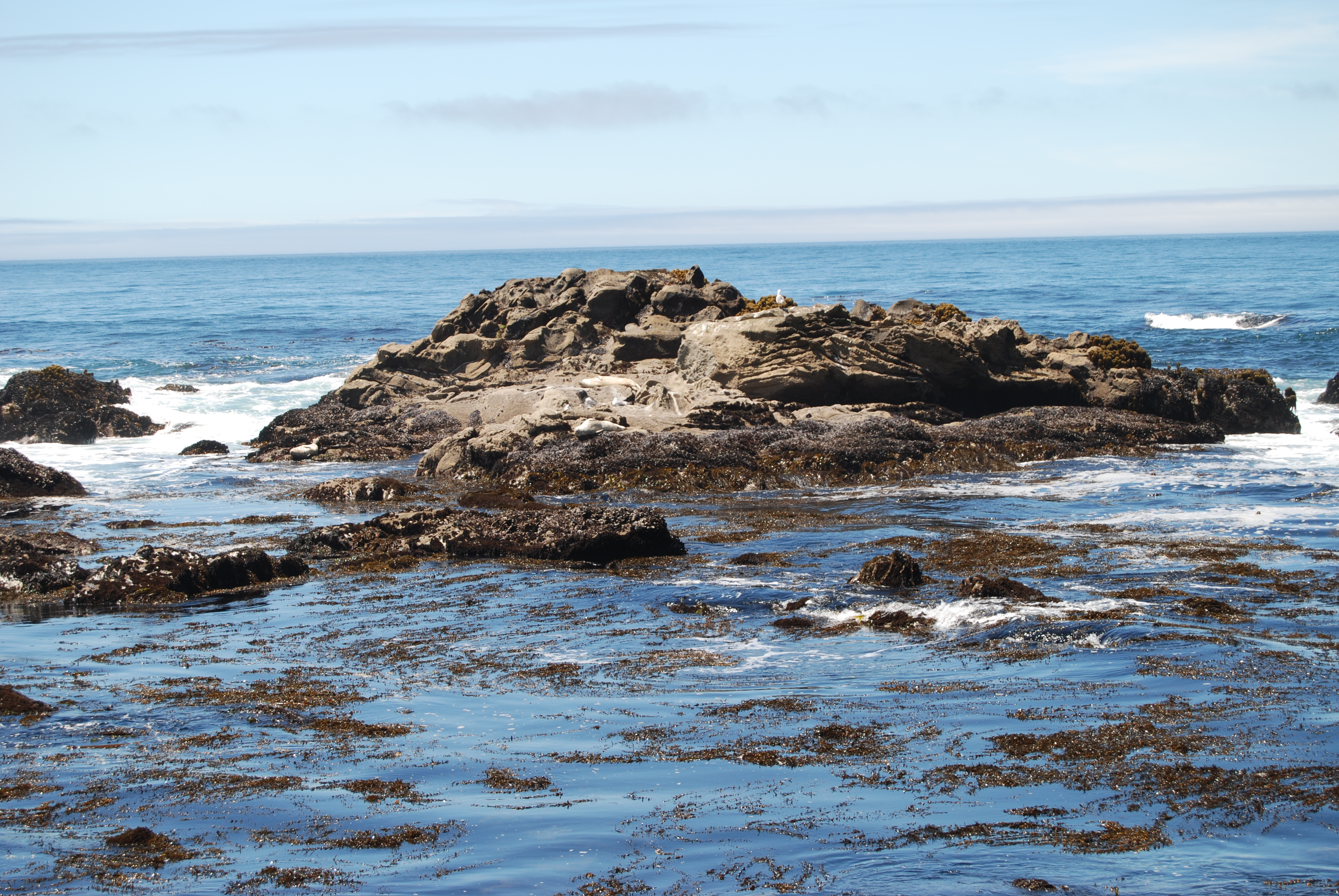
Salt Point State Park

== History ==
Stewarts Point SMR and Stewarts Point SMCA are two of 22 marine protected areas adopted by the California Department of Fish and Game in August 2009, during the second phase of the Marine Life Protection Act Initiative. The MLPAI is a collaborative public process to create a statewide network of protected areas along California’s coastline.

The north central coast’s new marine protected areas were designed by local divers, fishermen, conservationists and scientists who comprised the North Central Coast Regional Stakeholder Group. Their job was to design a network of protected areas that would preserve sensitive sea life and habitats while enhancing recreation, study and education opportunities.

The north central coast marine protected areas took effect May 1, 2010.

== Geography and natural features ==
Stewarts Point SMR and Stewarts Point SMCA are two adjoining marine protected areas that extend offshore from about a mile south of Black Point to Fisk Mill Cove, in Sonoma County on California’s north central coast.

The Stewarts Point SMR is bounded by the mean high tide line and straight lines connecting the following points in the order listed except where noted:

38° 40.50’ N. lat. 123° 25.37’ W. long.;

38° 40.50’ N. lat. 123° 30.24’ W. long.; thence southward along the three nautical mile offshore boundary to

38° 35.60’ N. lat. 123° 26.01’ W. long.; and

38° 35.60’ N. lat. 123° 20.80’ W. long., except that Stewarts Point State Marine Conservation Area as described.

The Stewarts Point SMCA is bounded by the mean high tide line and straight lines connecting the following points in the order listed except where noted:

38° 40.50’ N. lat. 123° 25.37’ W. long.;

38° 40.50’ N. lat. 123° 25.50’ W. long.;

38° 37.50’ N. lat. 123° 23.50’ W. long.; and

38° 37.535’ N. lat. 123° 23.027’ W. long.

== Habitat and wildlife ==
Stewarts Point SMR and Stewarts Point SMCA protect a complex rocky habitat which includes coves, kelp, wash rocks, shelves, walls, cobble and boulders as well as associated species like red abalone, red urchin and rockfish. It includes an area with a relatively steep depth gradient and provides continuous land-sea protection and management in waters adjacent to Salt Point State Park. Stewarts Point SMR and SMCA protect diverse habitats in a highly scenic and relatively remote area for natural heritage purposes.

== Recreation and nearby attractions ==
Nearby Salt Point State Park features six miles (9.7 km) of rugged coastline, free diving and SCUBA diving, 20 miles (32 km) of hiking trails, pygmy forests, horseback riding and two campgrounds. Fisk Mill Cove is a day use area that provides ocean views from Sentinel Rock and provides visitors with paved parking, picnic tables, small upright barbecues, restrooms, and drinking water. Stump Beach is another picnic area that also offers one of the few sandy beaches north of Jenner. Kruse Rhododendron State Natural Reserve adjoins Salt Point State Park and features hiking trails through pristine forests of Douglas fir, tanoak, grand fir and rhododendrons.

Of historical interest is nearby Fort Ross State Historic Park, the southernmost settlement in the Russian colonization of the North American continent that was established as an agricultural base to supply Alaska. It was the site of California's first windmills and shipbuilding, and Russian scientists were among the first to record California’s cultural and natural history.

Stewarts Point SMR prohibits the take of all living marine resources. Stewarts Point SMCA prohibits the take of all living marine resources, except recreational shore based take of marine aquatic plants (other than sea palm), marine invertebrates, finfish by hook and line, surf smelt by beach net, and species authorized by Title 14 Section 28.80 by hand-held dip net. California’s marine protected areas encourage recreational and educational uses of the ocean. Activities such as kayaking, diving, snorkeling, and swimming are allowed unless otherwise restricted.

== Scientific monitoring ==
As specified by the Marine Life Protection Act, select marine protected areas along California’s central coast are being monitored by scientists to track their effectiveness and learn more about ocean health. Similar studies in marine protected areas located off of the Santa Barbara Channel Islands have already detected gradual improvements in fish size and number.
