= Salt Point State Park =

State park in California, United States

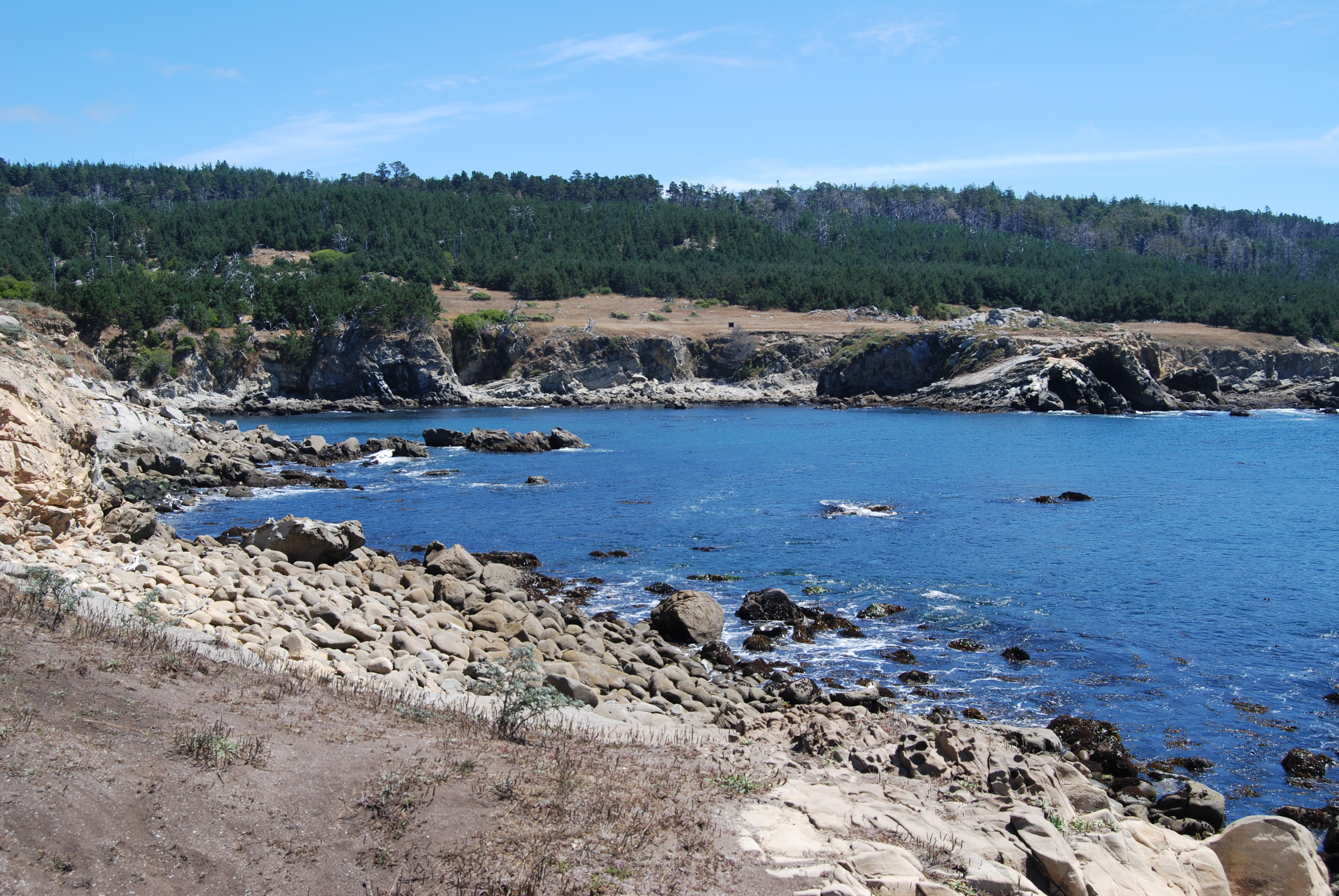
- Gerstle Cove

- Location within California Location within the United States
- Location: Sonoma County, California, United States
- Coordinates: 38°35′N 123°20′W
- Area: 6,000 acres (2,428 ha)
- Governing body: California Department of Parks and Recreation

Salt Point State Park is a state park in Sonoma County, California, United States. The park covers 6,000 acres (2,428 ha) on the coast of Northern California, with 20 miles (32 km) of hiking trails and over 6 miles (9.7 km) of a rough rocky coastline including Salt Point which protrudes into the Pacific Ocean. The park also features the first underwater preserves in California. The constant impact of the waves forms the rocks into many different shapes. These rocks continue underwater providing a wide variety of habitats for marine organisms. The activities at Salt Point include hiking, camping, fishing, scuba diving and many others. The weather is often cool with fog and cold winds, even during the summer.

The rocks of Salt Point are sedimentary sandstone. Due to the large amounts of sandstone, small cave-like features called tafoni can be found along the shore of Salt Point.

== Cultural and natural history ==
This park is named for the formation of salt crystals in the cracks and crevices of the rocky coastline. The native Kashaya Pomo collected salt from this area for many years. They used abalone chisels to scrape the salt off the rocks.

In 1853, Samuel Duncan and Joshua Hendy built a sawmill on a ridge located above Salt Point. A couple of years later, they leased the land to a San Francisco company, which quarried the sandstone. They used the sandstone to create the streets and buildings in San Francisco along with the naval facility at Mare Island. It is also possible to see drill holes in the sandstone at Gerstle Cove and at the marine terrace just north of it. In 1870, Duncan sold his property to Frederick Funcke and Lewis Gerstle. They shipped 5,000 cords of wood yearly and used most of the land to graze their cattle.

=== Gerstle Cove ===
The eyebolts used to anchor ships down are still visible at Gerstle cove. This is where sandstone and wood were loaded onto cargo ships. At first, they used wire cables anchored to the cliffside to load wood and stone onto the ships. Two chutes were eventually made; the Miller chute and the Funcke & Co. chute. There was a horse-drawn railroad that lead from the Miller sawmills to where the boats were loaded. The sawmill had a daily capacity of 18,000 board feet (42.48 m^{3}).

== Wildlife ==
=== Land ===
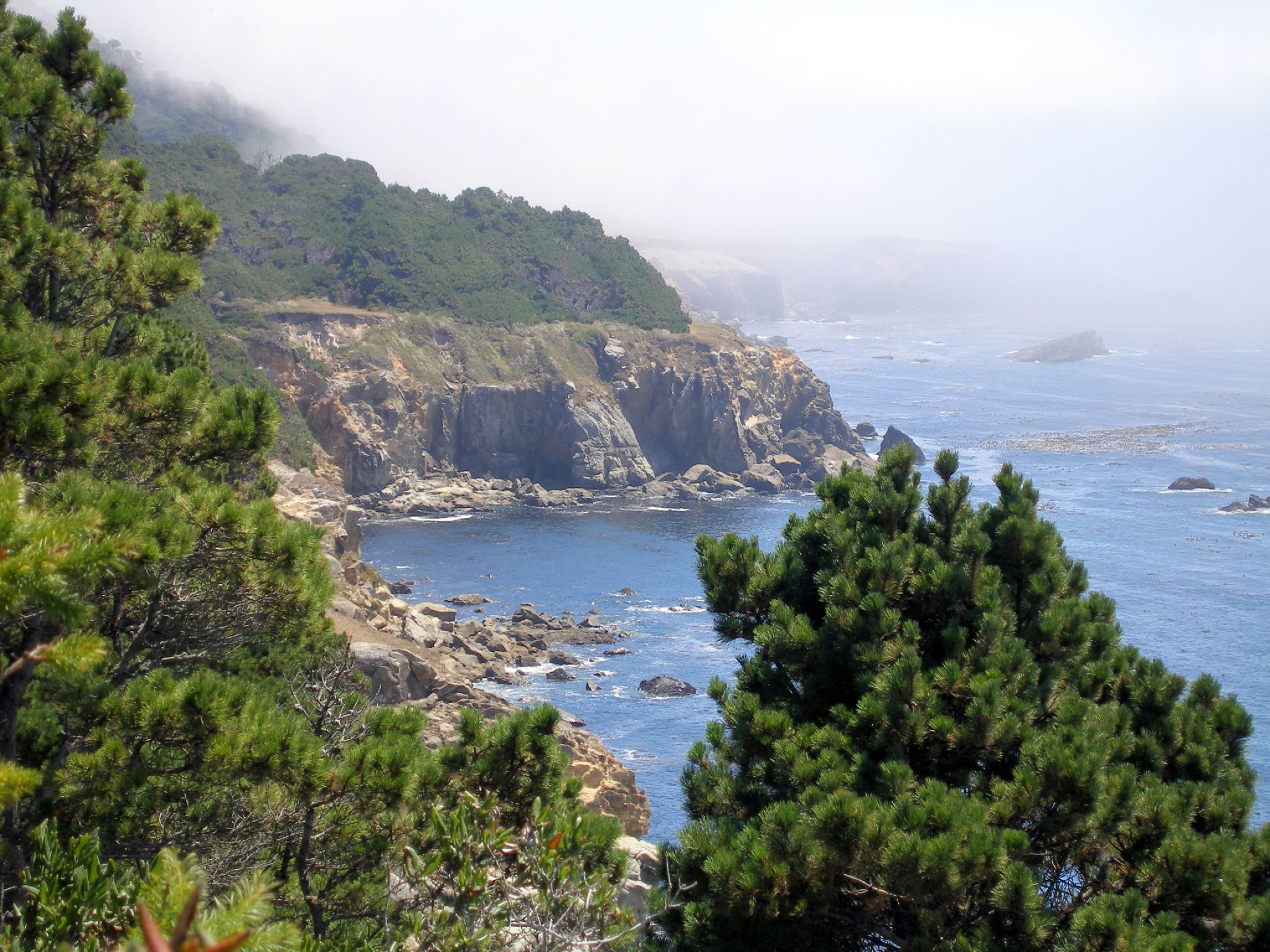
Bishop pine at Salt Point

Brush and grasslands cover the ground on the marine terraces; at higher elevations (approximately 100 to 300 feet (30 to 91 m) in elevation) Douglas fir forest dominates. At slightly higher staircase levels (about 300 to 500 feet (91 to 152 m)), a mixed fir forest of bishop pine and Douglas-fir is present intermixed with second growth coast redwood, madrones and tanoak. At 1,000 feet (305 m) there is a large open prairie where animals such as elk previously grazed. In addition, at an elevation of about 550 feet (168 m) within Salt Point State Park is a pygmy forest including the Mendocino cypress, bishop pine and Arctostaphylos. The reason these trees do not attain their normal height is due to the highly acidic soils with minimal nutrients and a hardpan layer close to the surface.

The native animals that roam the land include the black-tailed deer, raccoon, coyote, bobcat, gray fox, badger, striped skunk, and dozens of varieties of rodents such as squirrels, chipmunks, and the field mouse. Bears and cougars occasionally range the area, although visitors rarely see them.

The forest, grassland, and ocean shore area host a huge variety of birds, including pelicans, ospreys, woodpeckers (including the pileated woodpecker), and oystercatchers. Steller's jay and ravens are common in unattended campsites in search of food.

=== Marine ===
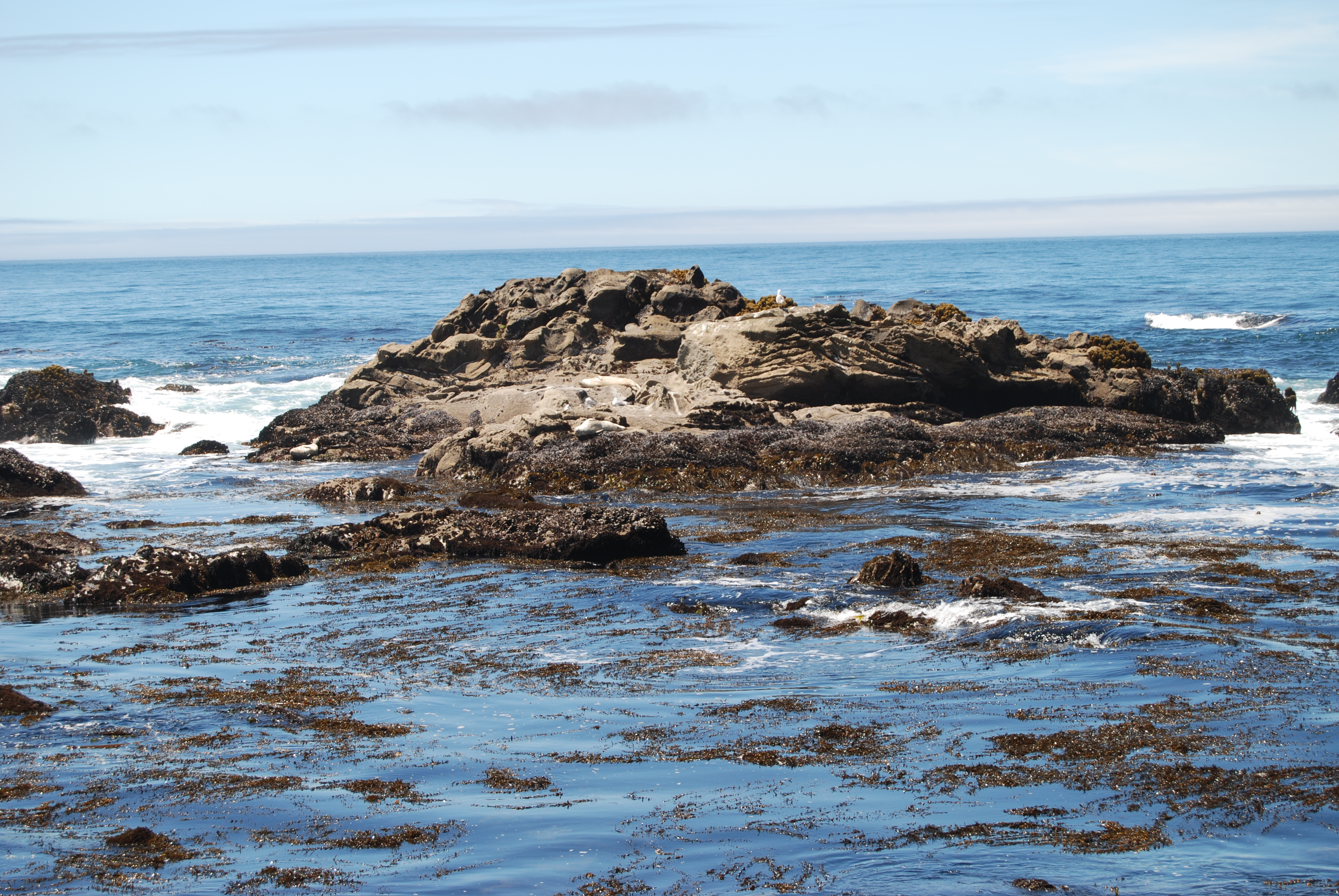
Tide pools

The ocean off Sonoma County averages 52 degrees F, with the warmest temperature recorded in 2014 at 57.2 °F and the coldest in 2007 at 50.9 °F. The coast of Sonoma County is known for its slow-growing red abalone. It takes this abalone 10 years to reach a diameter of 7 inches (180 mm). Harvested by divers for decades, abalone can no longer be harvested due to a long-term closure. Sport fishermen catch Lingcod, Kelp greenling, Cabezon (fish), and rockfish between the months of April and December. Between the months of December and April, it is possible to see gray whales migrating south to Baja California for breeding.

Stewarts Point State Marine Reserve & Stewarts Point State Marine Conservation Area, Salt Point State Marine Conservation Area and Gerstle Cove State Marine Reserve adjoin Salt Point State Park. Like underwater parks, these marine protected areas help conserve ocean wildlife and marine ecosystems.

== Geology ==
The coast in this park is lined with jagged rocks and steep ocean cliffs. The rocks are shaped and formed by the continuous crashing of the waves. These rocks provide an array of tide pools while the tide is out.

=== Rocks ===
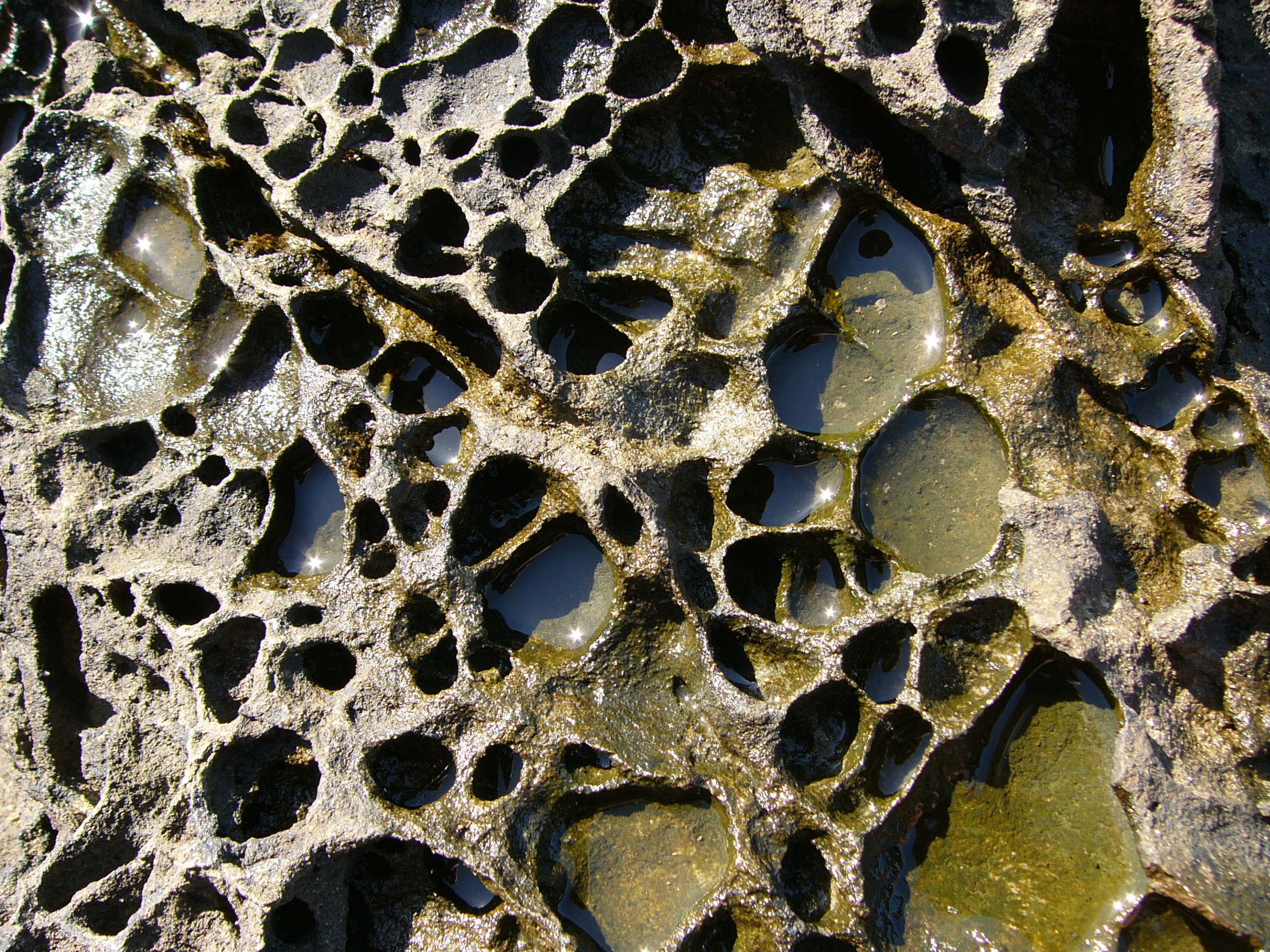
Sandstone with tafoni

The rocks of Salt Point are sedimentary, mainly sandstone. All of these rocks are tilted, exposing older rocks. The rocks at the north end of the park's coast are younger than the rocks at the southern end. Salt Point is named for the tafoni where the ocean water crystallizes in the honeycomb like crevices. This tafoni is caused when the salt crystals interact with the sandstone making parts of the sandstone harden while other parts soften.

=== Deep-sea fans ===
The layers of sedimentary rock show evidence of a deep-sea fan. A deep-sea fan is caused when there is dense, turbulent sediment filled water flowing down a submarine canyon. This highly dense water is called a turbidity current. Something that may cause a turbidity current are earthquakes or storms that create a submarine slide. When this sediment filled water leaves the end of the canyon it spreads out in a fan like shape. The sediment is thinner and thinner the farther away the sediment is from the submarine canyon. All of these layers of sedimentary rock are created thousands of feet below the ocean's surface but now the layers are visible above the surface of the water. This is because the Pacific Plate and the North American Plate are moving against each other; since the oceanic plate is lower, it is being forced below the continental plate in a process called subduction. While the oceanic plate is being subducted, the continental plate is scraping off the top layers of the oceanic plate slowly bringing them to the surface.

== Activities ==
The activities at Salt Point include hiking, camping, fishing, tide pooling, picnicking and scuba diving. There are over 20 miles (32 km) of hiking trails and over sixty campsites. The hiking trails are throughout the 6,000-acre (2,428 ha) park, and many of them lead to the beach. There are only a few sandy beaches at Salt Point, some with picnic areas with benches and barbecues. Salt Point has one of the first underwater parks in California: Gerstle Cove. Gerstle Cove is protected with no fishing allowed. Only small boats and scuba divers are allowed in Gerstle Cove. Much of the marine life can be viewed while the tide is out. The tide pools provide many different organisms including sea anemones and starfish. Fishing is allowed at the park except for Gerstle Cove. The fish that are available at Salt Point are lingcod, cabezone, rockfish, and greenlings.

=== Activities available ===
- Sea kayaking
- Bike trails
- En route campsites
- Environmental campsites
- Exhibits and programs
- Family campsites
- Fishing
- Group campsites
- Hike or bike campsites
- Hiking trails
- Horseback trails
- Scuba diving
- Wildlife viewing

== See also ==
- Black Point
- List of beaches in Sonoma County, California
- List of California state parks
