= Sunset State Beach =

State beach in Santa Cruz County, California, United States

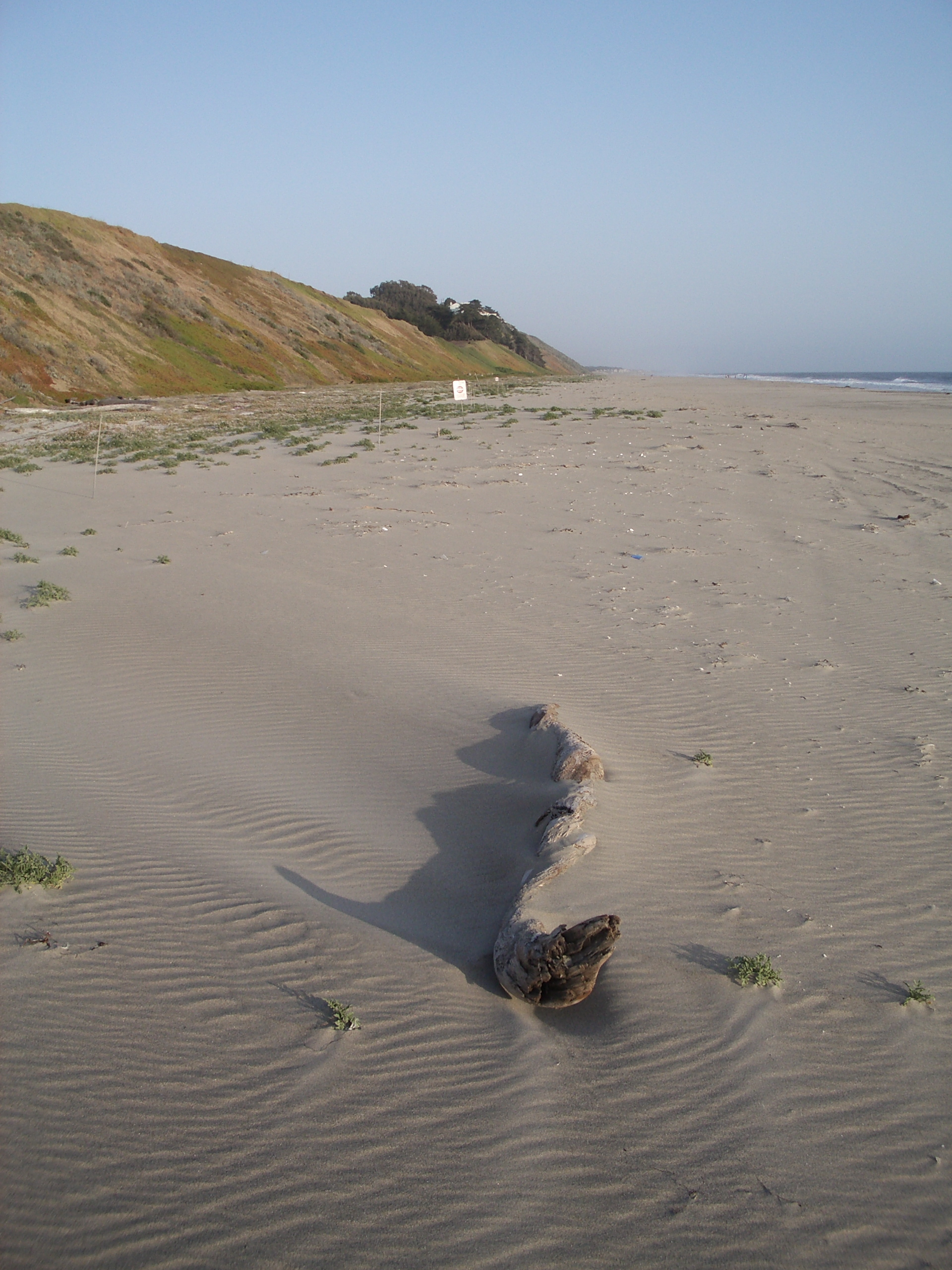
- Sunset State Beach

- Location within California Location within the United States
- Location: Watsonville, United States
- Nearest city: Watsonville
- Coordinates: 36°53′49″N 121°50′15″W
- Area: 302 acres (122 ha)
- Established: 1931
- Governing body: California Department of Parks and Recreation

Sunset State Beach is a park and beach on Monterey Bay, in Santa Cruz County, California.

It is operated by the California Department of Parks and Recreation.

== Geography ==
It is approximately 1.5 miles (2.5 km) long, and located near Watsonville.

It is surrounded by large agricultural fields west of the city of Watsonville. Manresa State Beach is to the north-upcoast of Sunset State Beach.

== See also ==
- California State Beaches
- List of California beaches
