= Huntington State Beach =

Protected beach in Southern California

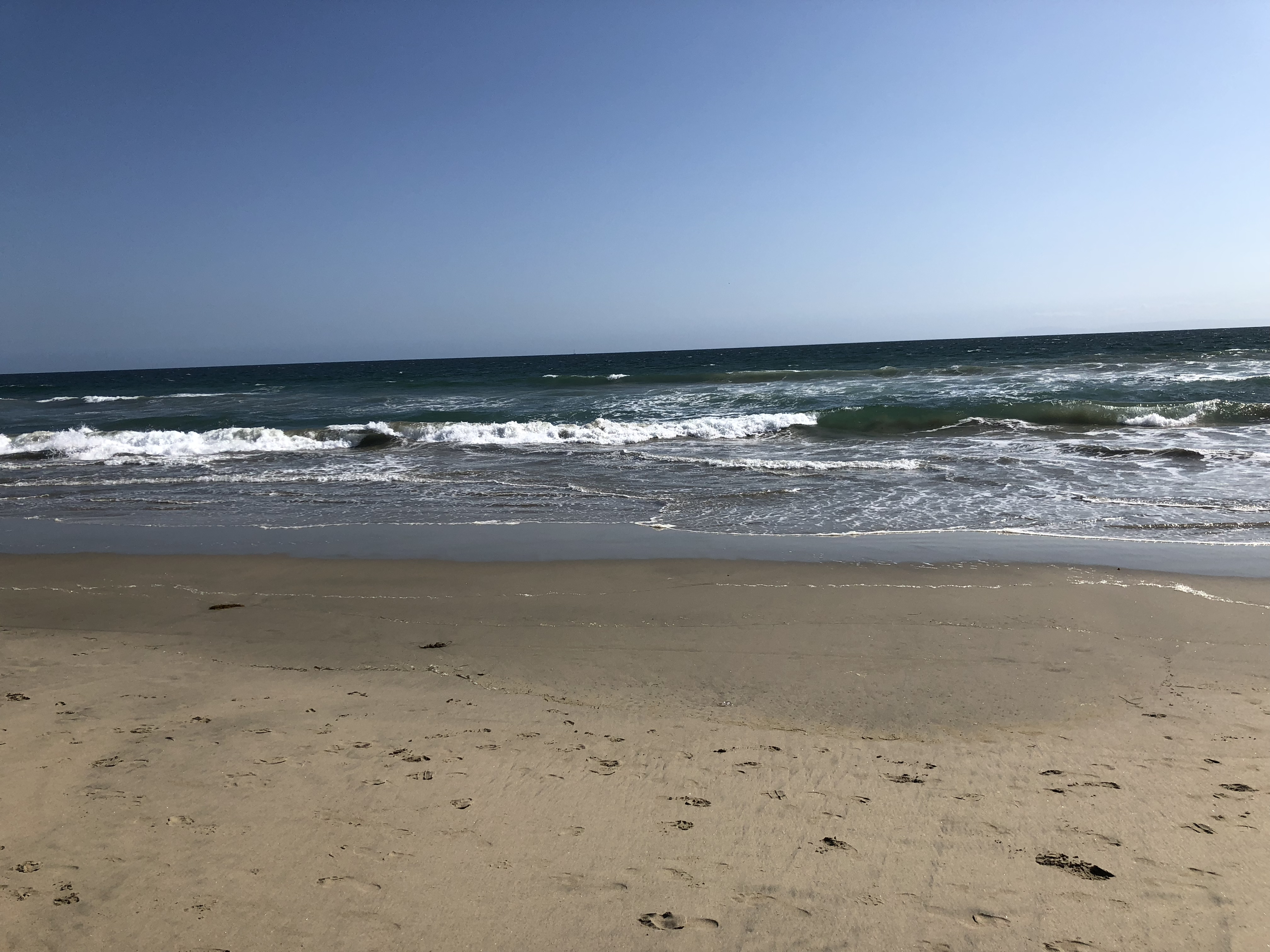
- Huntington State Beach

- Location within the Los Angeles metropolitan area Location within California Location within the United States
- Interactive map of Huntington State Beach
- Location: Orange County, California, United States
- Nearest city: Huntington Beach, California
- Coordinates: 33°38′15″N 117°58′20″W
- Area: 121 acres (49 ha)
- Established: 1942
- Governing body: California Department of Parks and Recreation

Huntington State Beach is a protected beach in Southern California, located in the City of Huntington Beach in Orange County. It extends 2 miles (3.2 km) from Newport Beach (Santa Ana River) north to Beach Boulevard, where the Huntington City Beach begins. The 121-acre (49 ha) park was established in 1942.

This beach is a popular destination for many beach enthusiasts. This beach has moderate to good surf, fishing, volleyball courts, basketball courts, bathrooms, and fire-rings for bonfires. Lifeguard Services at Huntington State Beach are provided by the California State Parks Lifeguard Service. Lifeguards patrol the beach year-round while lifeguard towers are staffed roughly Memorial Day weekend through Labor Day weekend.

The beach also provides a nesting sanctuary for California least terns, an endangered subspecies, and snowy plovers, a threatened species on the West Coast.

== History ==
Huntington State Beach is the location for California State Lifeguard Training.

State Lifeguards

1938 Doheny, San Clemente State Beaches have lifeguard services provided by county of Orange.

1950 State begins development and operation of Huntington State Beach. Division of Beaches and Parks explores concept of contracting lifeguard service at the newly developed park but elects to start own service after consulting with lifeguard services up and down the coast. Robert Isenor, a former Newport City Lifeguard is hired as a seasonal employee to develop the first State Lifeguard program. He hired 17 seasonal lifeguards, who worked out of ten towers with no phones or radios and were supported by one jeep. State Lifeguards performed 27 swimmer rescues that first summer. Beach attendance was 211,000 that year.

1951 Silver Strand State Beach is opened and Isenor coordinates hiring of seasonal lifeguards for this operation.

1952 San Clemente State Beach is now guarded by two seasonal lifeguards. First use of mobile radio at Huntington.

1953 Robert Isenor is appointed in first full-time lifeguard classification as District Lifeguard Supervisor with a starting pay of $341 per month. Summertime beach operations are coordinated by Seasonal Beach Lifeguard Supervisors at each park unit. The Boy Scout National Jamboree brings 14,000 scouts to Huntington State Beach and Isenor's crew is acknowledged in Life magazine for their outstanding safety record during this event (no drownings).

1954 Service started at Ventura and Carpinteria. Isenor is designated as first Lifeguard Peace Officer, July 1954.

1955 State provides two seasonal lifeguards at Carlsbad State Beach and begins own service at Doheny.

1956 First requests for a Permanent Lifeguard Classification initiated. Positions requested for Carlsbad, Doheny, Silver Strand and the Salton Sea.

1957 State considers providing service at Folsom, Pajaro, Stinson Beach and Half Moon Bay. Permanent Lifeguard Classification established. Folsom, Santa Cruz and Stinson get seasonal guards.

1958 Department develops an aquatic safety program, tasking every park unit in the state to identify its aquatic recreation resources and hazards. Seasonal lifeguards provided at Torrey Pines. First budget request for a rescue boat at Huntington State Beach. Mel Tubbs become first department sanctioned SCUBA diver at Huntington. First seasonal lifeguards provided at El Capitan.

1960 Lifeguard service starts at Bolsa Chica State Beach (known as "Tin Can Beach" before it was cleaned).

1962 Lifeguard testing and training is formalized to include 1000 yard swim, 600 yard run-swim-run and 20 hours of in-service first aid and rescue instruction. Training is held at each park unit.

1964 Lifeguard Rescue Boat "Surfwatch" launched & makes dramatic mass rescue of 36 victims from one rip current at Huntington State Beach. Second Rescue Boat, "Sea Ranger" is launched at Salton Sea: lifeguards provide six months of service at Salton Sea.

Late Sixties Department creates Aquatic Specialist and Lifeguard Supervisor positions. California State Lifeguard Association is formed. Lifeguards successfully lobby for Safety Retirement. Formal statewide Lifeguard Training is instituted at Huntington for all new lifeguards. State Parks develops the first planned recreation area at Lake Perris.

Isenor continued directing lifeguard services for 33 years, retiring in 1983. At one time there were a total of four Aquatic Specialists coordinating the programs throughout the state. Today there is one Specialist assigned the oversight for the entire Park System.

1973 Isenor pushes to have the Permanent Lifeguard series included in the peace officer training and California State Parks becomes the first agency in the nation to have armed lifeguards with full peace officer powers.

1983 – 1984 Due to the high turnover of Ranger personnel assigned to Huntington and Bolsa Chica State Beaches, positions are converted to the Lifeguard series and Lifeguards are given the responsibility of operating one of the largest beach operations—day and night.

1987 In response to growing a boom in population, dramatic increases in recreation usage, and numerous drownings along the Central and Northern California coastline, a budget change proposal is approved that places lifeguards along the Russian River coastal area, more than doubles the size of the Santa Cruz seasonal lifeguard operation, and places two permanent lifeguards in the Monterey District.

Spring 1995 Los Angeles County threatens to remove their lifeguard operation from State Beaches in Los Angeles County. State lifeguards performed the single most historic marshalling of lifeguard resources in California history in May 1995, when the County of Los Angeles removed their lifeguard service from eight State owned, but County operated beaches. State Lifeguards served 14,000,000 visitors, performing over 4,000 rescues on those beaches and had no drownings that summer

California State Parks now operates one of the largest professional lifeguard services in the world, with more than 600 seasonal and 70 full-time lifeguards and supervisors. The service spans more than 600 miles of diverse coastline from the Sonoma Coast to the Mexican Border, and inland bodies of water from Folsom and Clear Lake to Lake Perris and Silverwood. State lifeguards annually perform more than 10,000 swimmer rescues, save millions of dollars of boater property; perform 6,000 medical aides, swift water rescues, urban flood rescues, technical cliff rescues and the full range of law enforcement duties.

2001 California State Parks celebrates the 50th Anniversary of the State Lifeguard service. A commemorative badge is approved in honor of the occasion.

== Geography ==
Huntington State Beach is located in the City of Huntington Beach. The beach can be traveled to by five different roads: Pacific Coast Highway, Beach Blvd., Newland Street, Magnolia Street, and Brookhurst Street. There are two river mouths located at the southern end of the beach, Talbert Channel and the Santa Ana River. The beach is very wide and at sea level. Sandbars extend across and upcoast throughout the beach, creating shallow waters around the south end.

Located directly behind Huntington State Beach are two power plants, wetlands, sand dunes, sewage facility, residential homes and a toxic waste dump. It is thought that because of the penetration of toxic chemicals into the soil, high level water contamination is often around the Magnolia Street entrance. Around the Brookhurst Street entrance high levels of contamination are also typical because of both river mouths.

== Recreation ==
Surfing

Huntington State Beach faces almost true south. Between late spring, summer and into the fall, Huntington State Beach directly receives all swells from the south. When swells from the North/West combine with south swells, Huntington State Beach is a premier spot for surfing. Due to the Santa Ana River Jetties located at the southern end of the beach, large sandbars extend across and upcoast approximately 1 mile. These sandbars shift dramatically during the spring and summer seasons thus creating dangerous conditions. Surf at this beach often breaks very steep, rapid and hollow. Novice surfers are not encouraged to surf at this location. Shortboards are highly recommended.

Swimming

Swimming is allowed at Huntington State Beach with lifeguard services available. Ocean currents can be extremely dangerous at this beach creating large rip currents. Aquatic rescues are more than common and the probability of drowning for a non-swimmer in unguarded water is likely. Swimmers are advised to take extreme caution, remain close to shore and in front of a lifeguard tower.

Multi-use trail

A paved pathway extends across the length of the beach. This pathway is a small segment of a large trail commencing from Long Beach down to Balboa Pier at Newport Beach. The Santa Ana River trail terminates at the south end of the beach, at the mouth of the River.

Sunbathing

Southern California is known for great weather and plenty of sunshine. Huntington State Beach tends to be less breezy than nearby upcoast locations, nevertheless can be cold at times.

Fire rings

Huntington State Beach provides large fire rings across the beach. These rings are at a first-come, first-served basis. Large fires are permitted as long as wood pallets are not used. "Bonfires" can remain until 2130 HRS, at that time all visitors must exit the park. Park entrance closes at 2100 HRS, park officially closes at 2200 HRS.

Fishing

Huntington State Beach is a popular place for surf fishing. perch, corbina, croaker, cabezon and shovelnose guitarfish are among the fish that can be caught there. Huntington State Beach does permit surf fishing as long as there are no nearby swimmers. Fishing license must be displayed as required.

Birdwatching

A California least tern and snowy plover reserve is located at the southern end of the beach between Talbert Channel and the Santa Ana River. Trespassing is prohibited and dogs are not allowed on the sand (except on the northern side of the beach between lifeguard tower #22 and lifeguard tower #26) nor anywhere near the reserve.

== See also ==
- List of beaches in California
- List of California state parks
