= Pelican State Beach =

State park in California, United States

Coordinates: 41°59′33″N 124°12′36″W

Pelican State Beach is a designated California State Beach located in Del Norte County, California. Located 21 miles (30 km) north of Crescent City on US Route 101 near the town of Smith River, this undeveloped site is immediately south of the Oregon state line, making it the northernmost California state beach. It is also the northern terminus of the California Coastal Trail.

The beach is popular for walking and beachcombing along the beautiful ocean views. Because of its remote location and easy-to-miss access road, it has been described as "the loneliest beach in California".

At five acres, this sandy beach contains grassy dunes and driftwood. There are no facilities, but parking is available. Climate can vary substantially between seasons, from cool, rainy winters to very sunny fall and spring.

== See also ==
- List of beaches in California
