= Corona del Mar State Beach =

Protected area

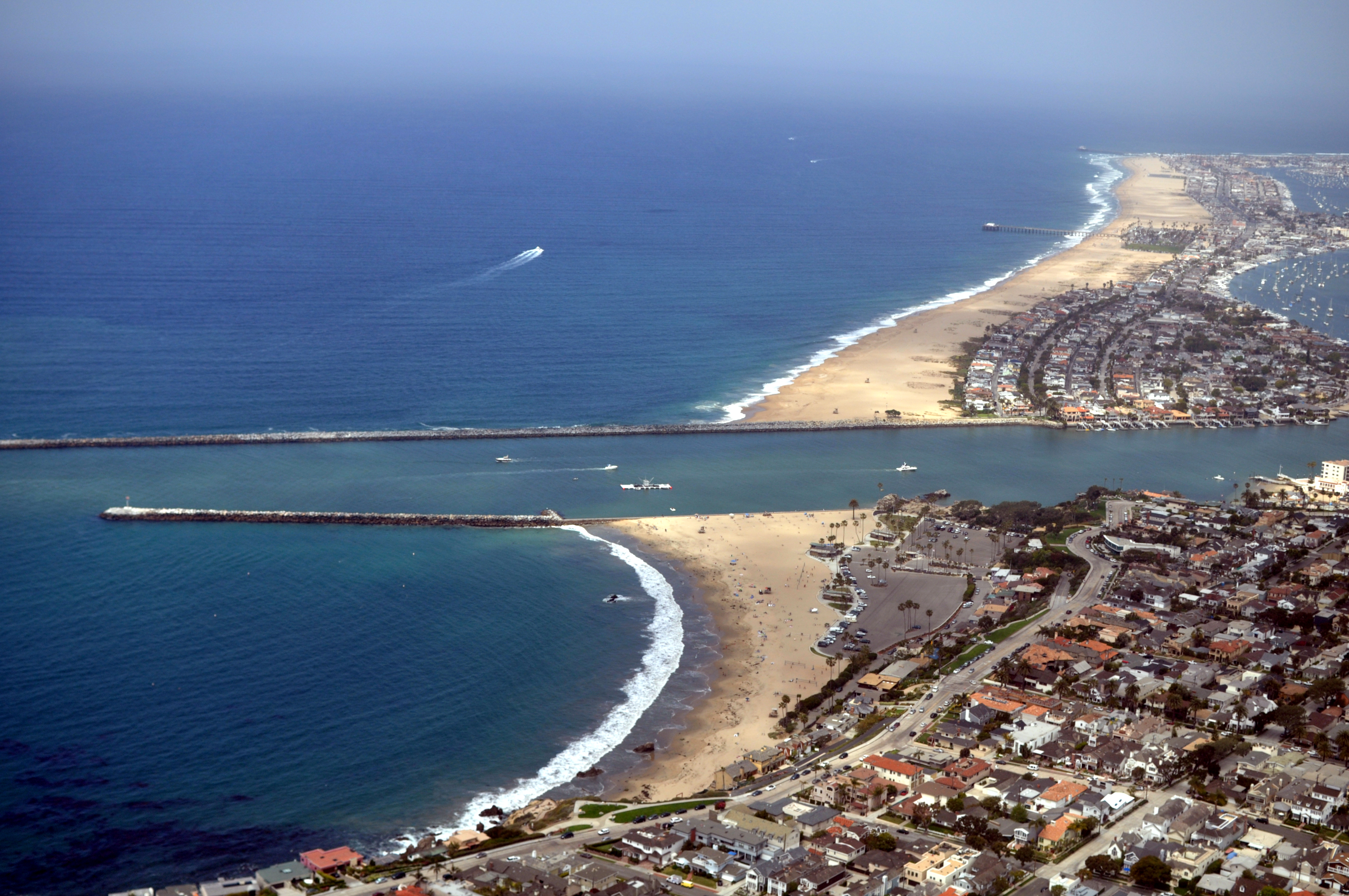
- Aerial view of Corona del Mar State Beach (foreground; on the far side of the jetty is The Wedge and the Balboa Peninsula)

- Location within California Location within the United States
- Location: Orange County, California, United States
- Nearest city: Newport Beach, California
- Coordinates: 33°35′37″N 117°52′30″W
- Area: 30 acres (12 ha)
- Established: 1947
- Governing body: California Department of Parks and Recreation

Aerial views of Arch Rock at Corona Del Mar beach.

Corona del Mar State Beach (Spanish for the Crown of the Sea) is a protected beach in the state park system of California, United States. It is located in Corona del Mar, Newport Beach, and operated by the city of Newport Beach. It is known locally as Big Corona to distinguish it from a neighboring beach, Little Corona. The 30-acre (12 ha) park was established in 1947.

== History ==
The beach had been a surfing hotspot until the late 1930s, when the Newport Harbor jetty was extended, leading to the creation of The Wedge as a popular surf break, but shielding Corona from all but the most southerly swells.

Surfing legend Duke Kahanamoku is credited with the first use of a surfboard for rescue purposes at Corona del Mar beach in 1925, when a charted fishing vessel capsized in heavy surf and Kahanamoku rescued people via surfboard.

== See also ==
- List of beaches in California
- List of California state parks
  - List of California State Beaches
