= Carpinteria State Beach =

State park in California, United States

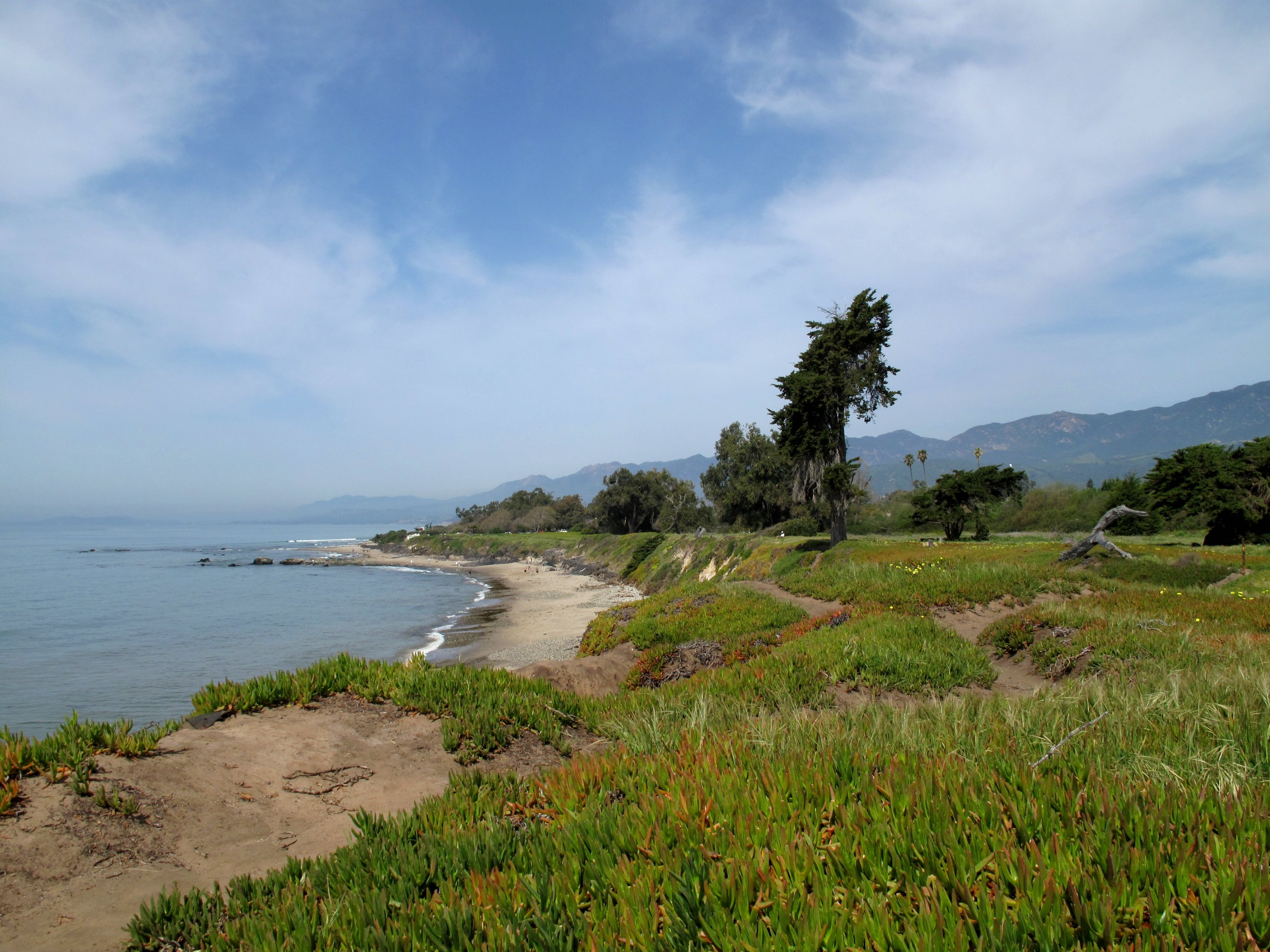
- Carpinteria State Beach coastline

- Location within California Location within the United States
- Location: Santa Barbara and Ventura Counties, California, United States
- Nearest city: Carpinteria, California
- Coordinates: 34°23′31″N 119°31′16″W
- Area: 62 acres (25 ha)
- Established: 1932
- Governing body: California Department of Parks and Recreation

Carpinteria State Beach is a protected beach in the state park system of California, in Santa Barbara County, Southern California.

== Features ==
Geography

The park is located in the city of Carpinteria, 12 miles (19 km) south of Santa Barbara. The park has 4,685 feet (1,428 m) of beachfront. The address is 205 Palm Ave Carpinteria, CA 93013.

History

The 62-acre (25 ha) park was established in 1932.

=== Recreation ===
Recreational activities include bird watching, ocean swimming, surf fishing, nature walks, camping, and tidepool exploration.

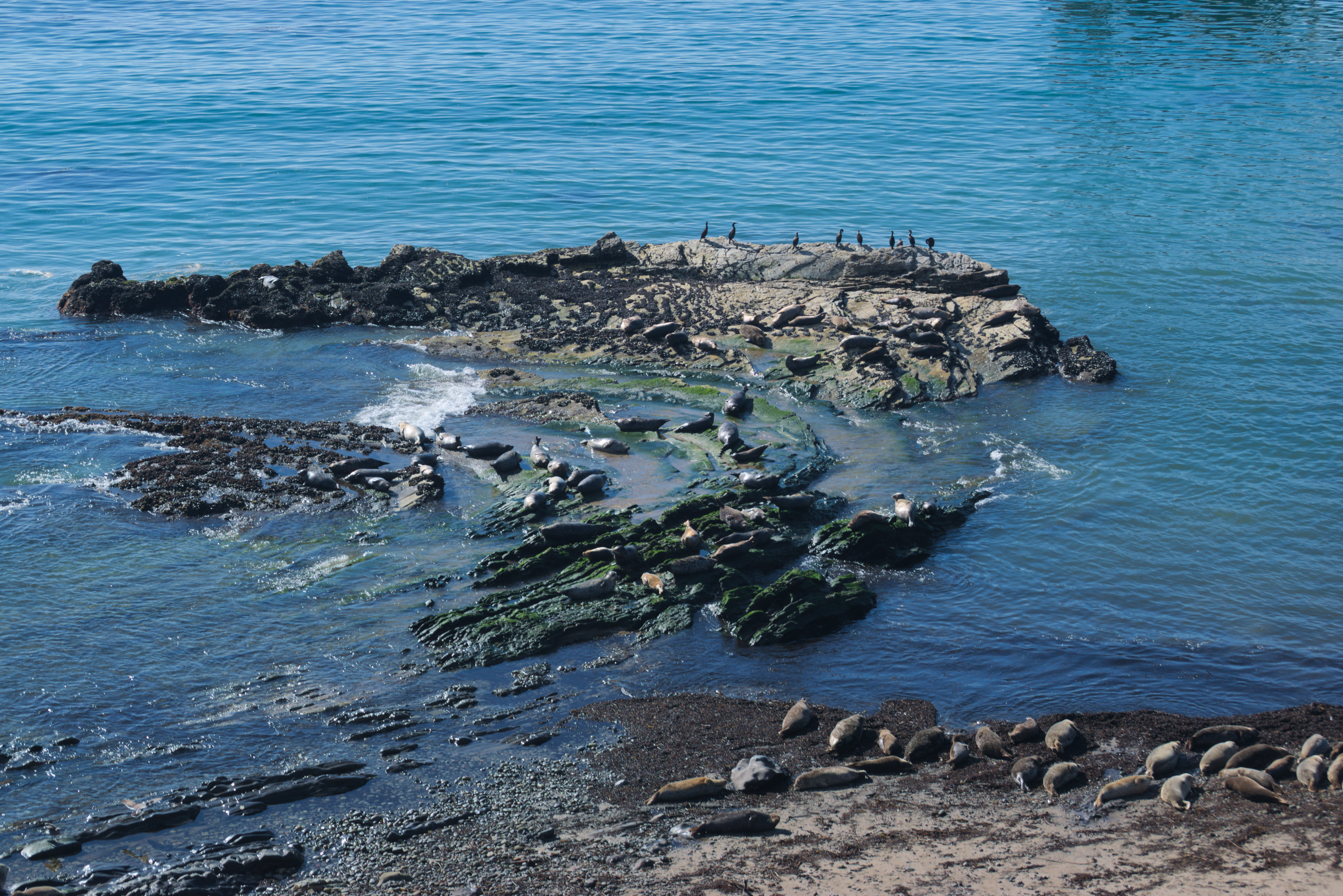
Picture from the observation cliff of the rookery at the Carpinteria Harbor Seal preserve

The Carpinteria Harbor Seal Preserve and rookery is located south of the park, protecting the Harbor seal (Phoca vitulina). It is one of the four harbor seal rookeries remaining along the Southern California coast.

== See also ==
- List of beaches in California
- List of California state parks
  - List of California State Beaches
