= Cayucos State Beach =

State park in California, United States

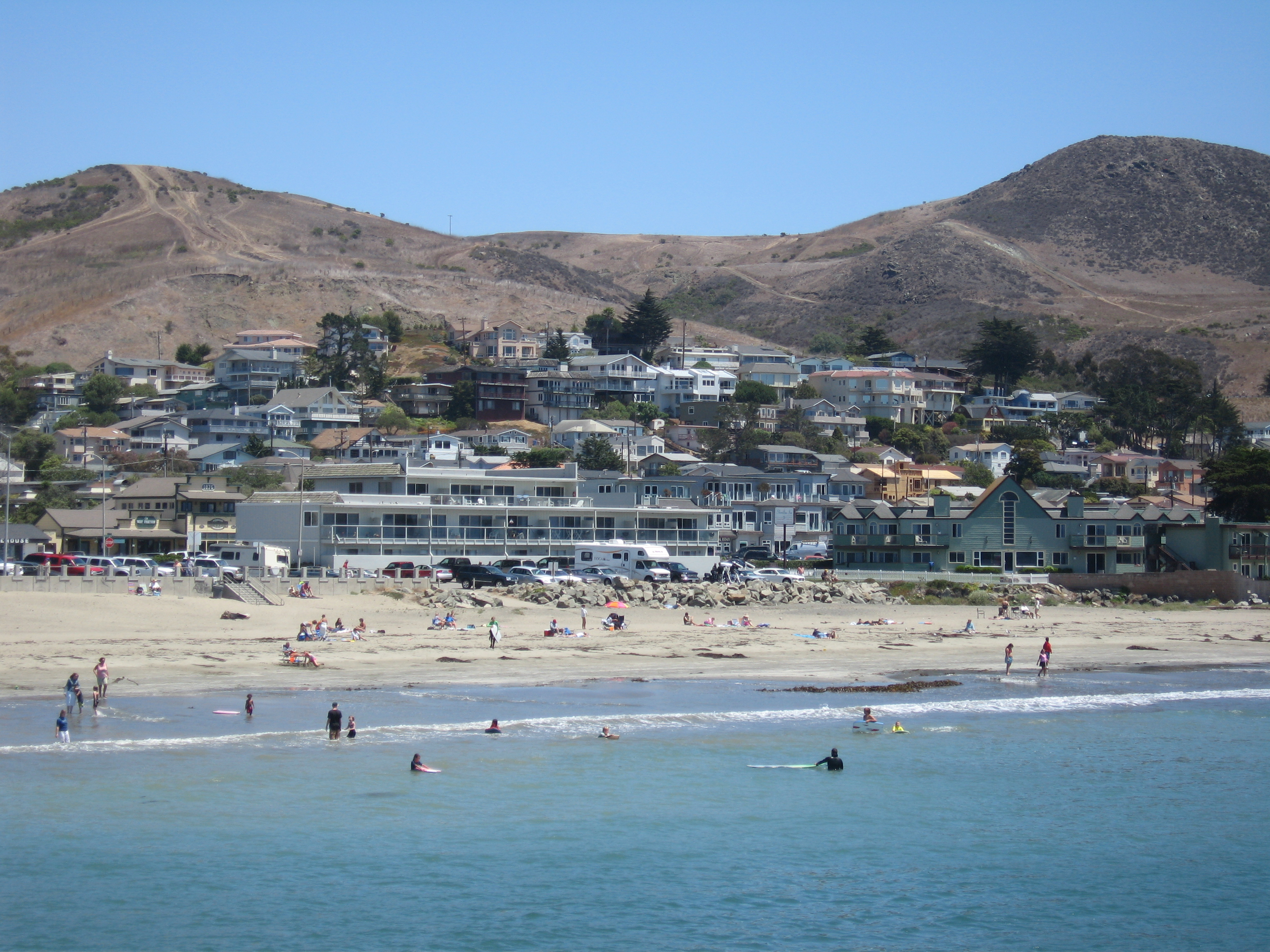

- Location within California Location within the United States
- Location: San Luis Obispo County, California, United States
- Nearest city: Cayucos, California
- Coordinates: 35°26′51″N 120°54′15″W
- Area: 16 acres (6.5 ha)
- Established: 1940
- Governing body: California Department of Parks and Recreation

Cayucos State Beach is a protected beach in the state park system of California, United States. It is located in Cayucos, San Luis Obispo County. The sandy beach environment supports uses of swimming and surfing. Prehistorically this general area of the central coast was inhabited by the Chumash people, who settled the coastal San Luis Obispo area approximately 10,000 to 11,000 BCE, including a large village to the south of Cayucos at Morro Creek. The 16-acre (6.5 ha) park was established in 1940.

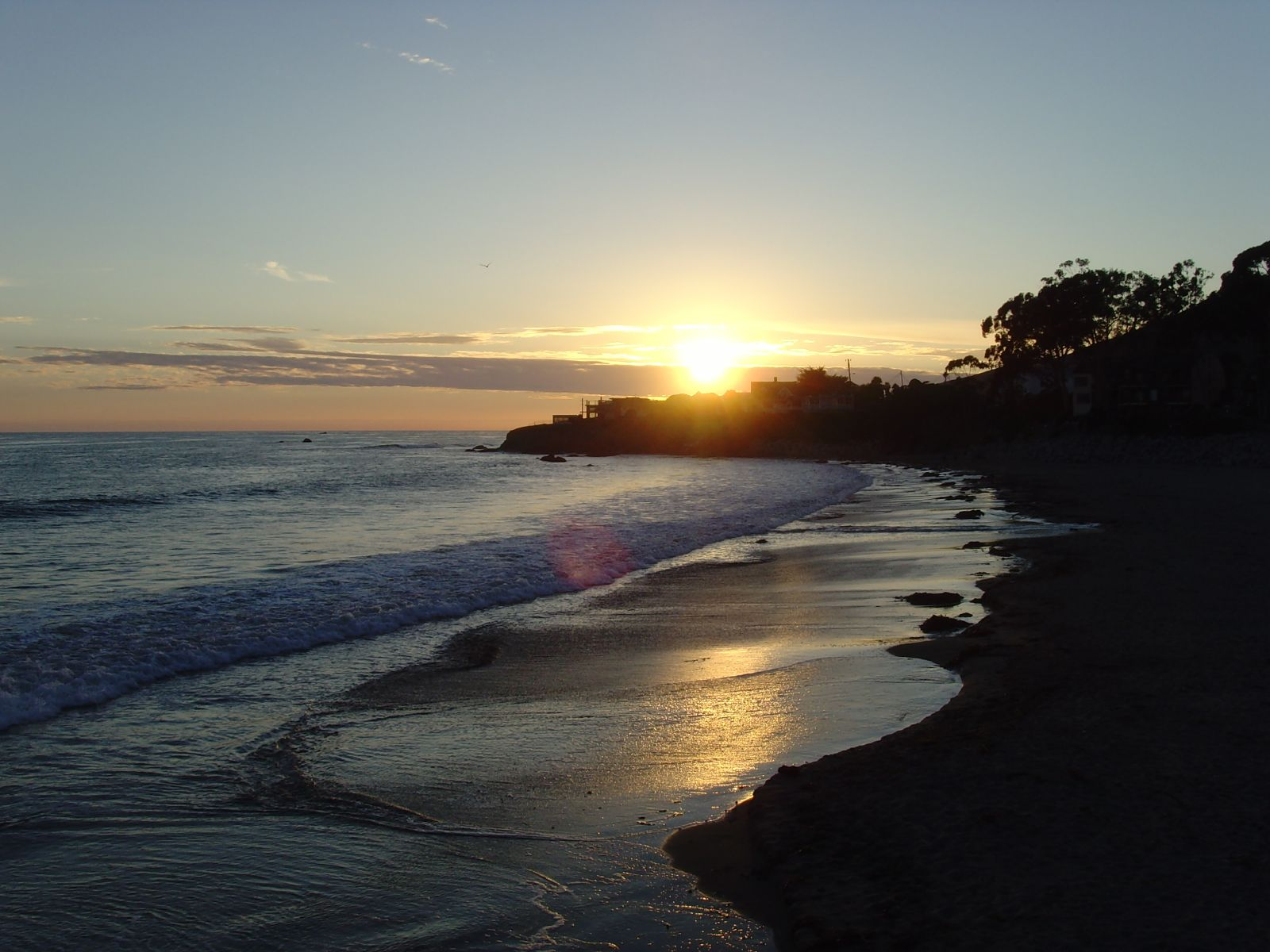
Cayucos State Beach at Sunset

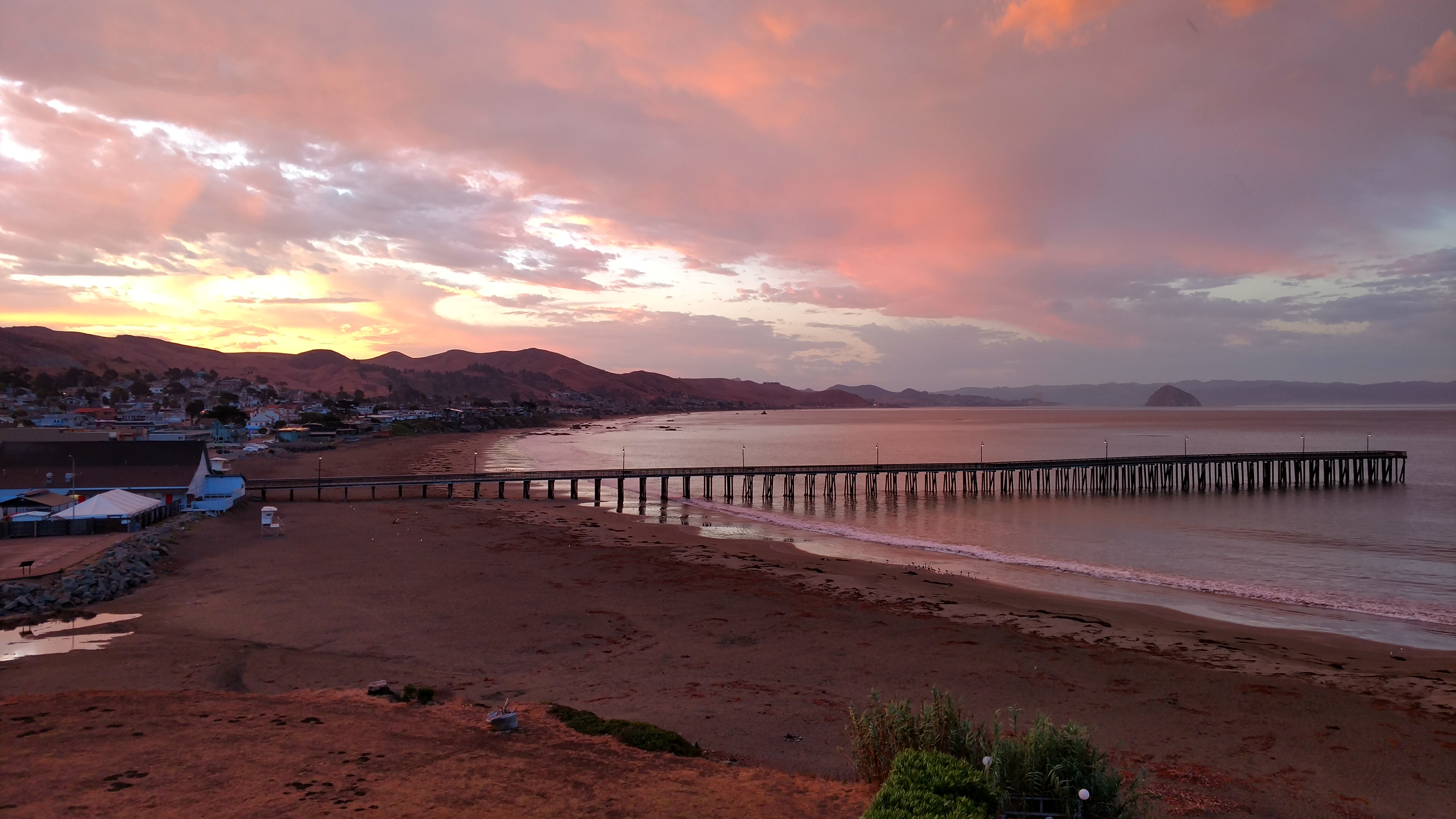
Cayucos State Beach and the Cayucos Pier at Sunrise

== See also ==
- List of beaches in California
- List of California state parks
