= Westport-Union Landing State Beach =

California State Beach

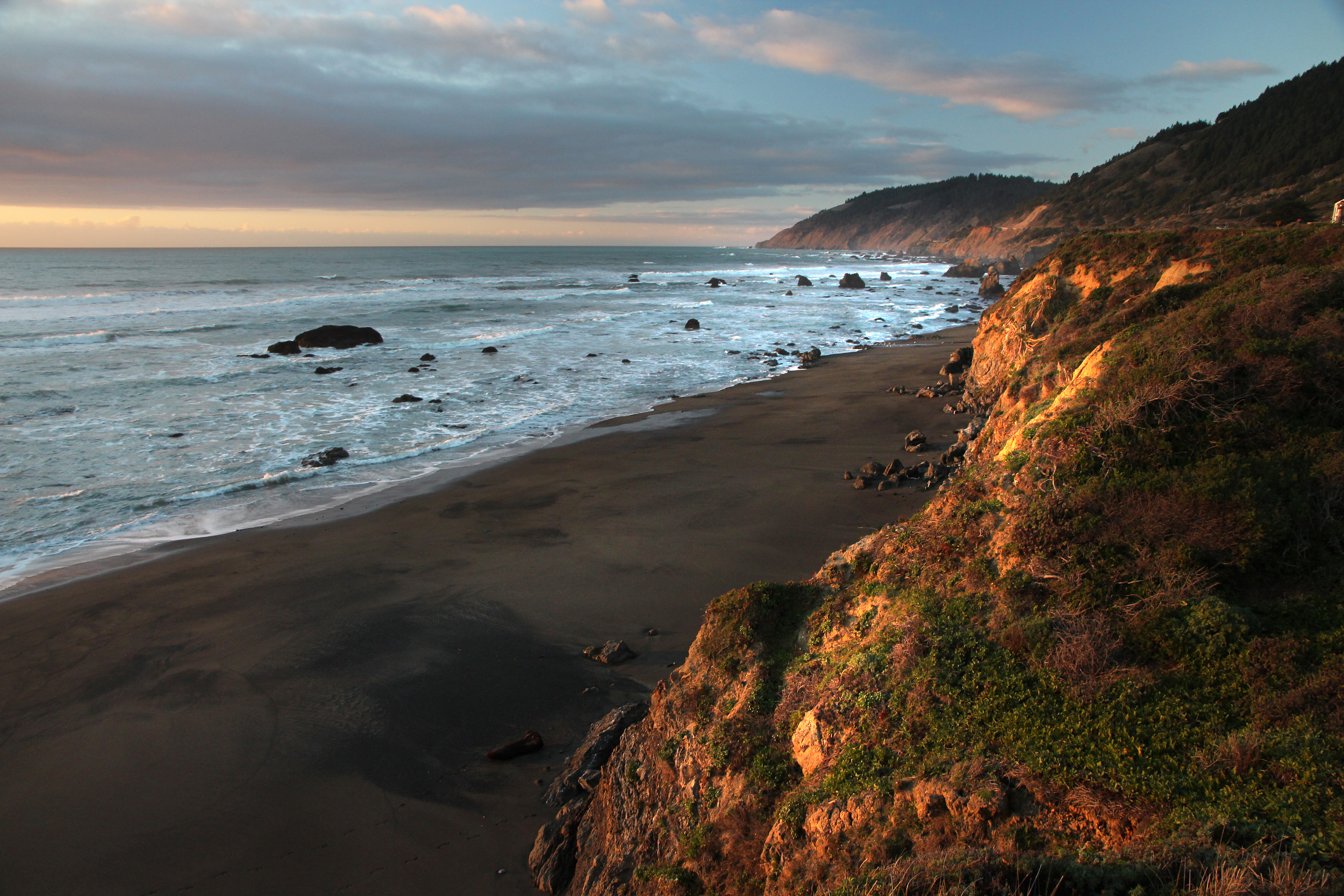

- Location within California Location within the United States
- Location: Fort Bragg, California
- Nearest city: Fort Bragg
- Coordinates: 39.677°N 123.791°W
- Governing body: California Department of Parks and Recreation

Westport-Union Landing State Beach is located in Mendocino County in Northern California. Covering over 3 miles (4.8 km) of rugged and scenic coastline, this beach consists of 46 campsites with ocean and mountain views. Fishing is common on this beach.

This beach is located 19 miles (31 km) north of Fort Bragg on Highway 1. It is named after two early-day communities, Westport and Union Landing. Westport is a sawmill town that is still in existence while only few buildings remain in Union Landing.

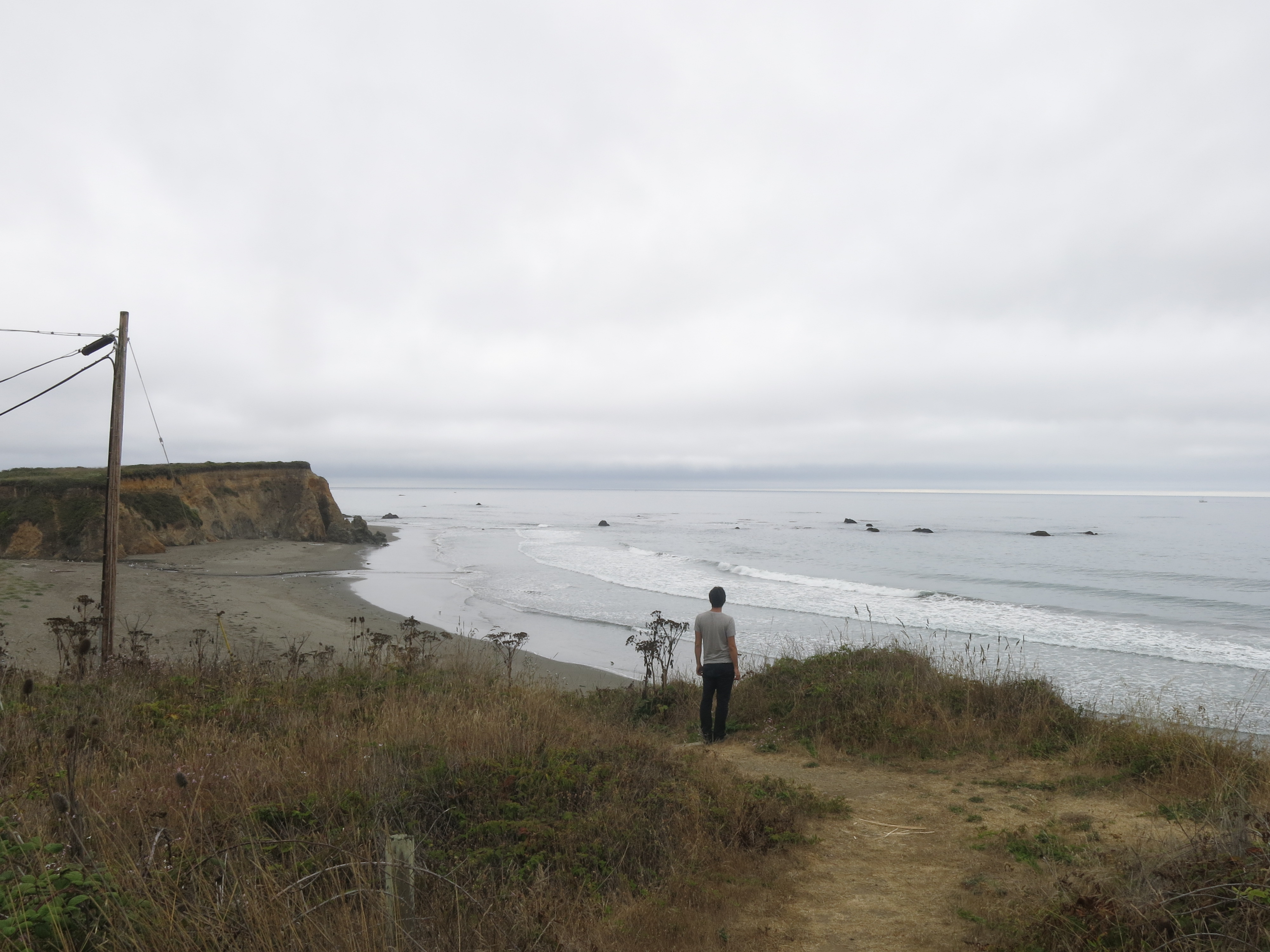
A view from cliffs of Westport-Union Landing State Beach.

== See also ==
- List of beaches in California
- List of California state parks
