= List of beaches in California =

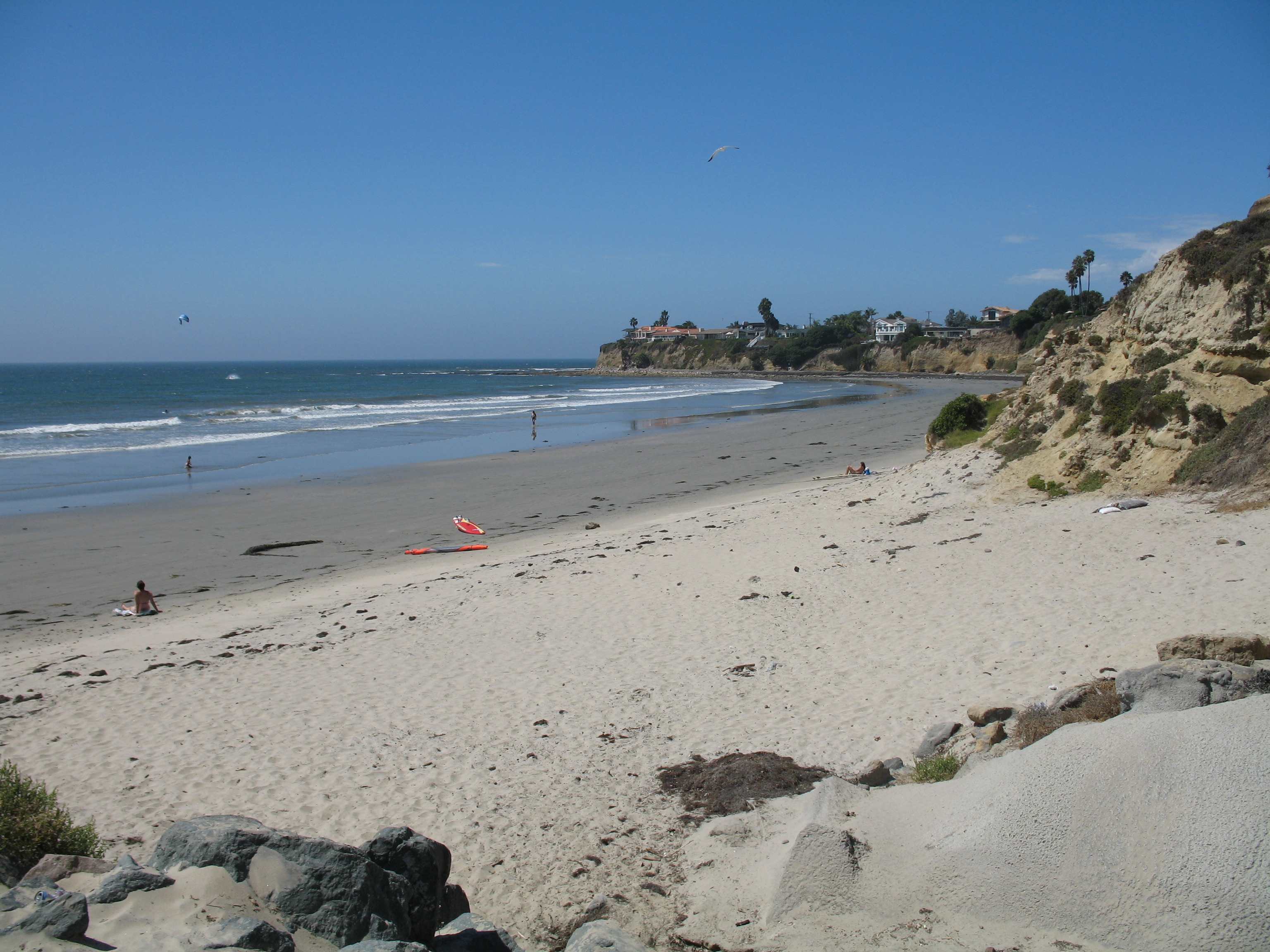
The beach at Tourmaline Surfing Park in Pacific Beach, San Diego, California

This list of California beaches is a list of beaches that are situated along the coastline of the State of California, US. The information in this article draws extensively from the California Coastal Access Guide, a comprehensive resource that provides detailed information on over 1150 public access points along California's extensive 1271-mile coastline.

== North to south ==
The beaches are listed in order from north to south, and are grouped by county. The list includes all of the California State Beaches, but not all other beaches are listed here. In some cases (as indicated), more detailed list articles of beaches are available for certain areas of the coast, currently for Sonoma County and San Diego County.

=== Del Norte County ===
- Pelican State Beach
- Crescent Beach
- Redwood National Park
- Prairie Creek Redwoods State Beach

=== Humboldt County ===
- Humboldt Lagoons State Park
- Sue-meg State Park
- Trinidad State Beach
- Little River State Beach
- Clam Beach County Park
- Sinkyone Wilderness State Park

=== Mendocino County ===
- Westport-Union Landing State Beach
- MacKerricher State Park
- Caspar Headlands State Beach
- Russian Gulch State Park
- Manchester State Park
- Schooner Gulch State Beach
- Glass Beach (Fort Bragg, California)

=== Sonoma County ===
Numbers in parentheses are Geographic Names Information System feature ids.

=== Sonoma County ocean beaches ===
Coastal beaches, listed from north to south:

- Gualala Point Regional Park (224703)
- Sea Ranch, California (1723333):
  - Walk-On Beach
  - Shell Beach (232932)
  - Stengle Beach
  - Pebble Beach (1723331)
  - Black Point Beach (1723317)
- Salt Point State Park (232329):
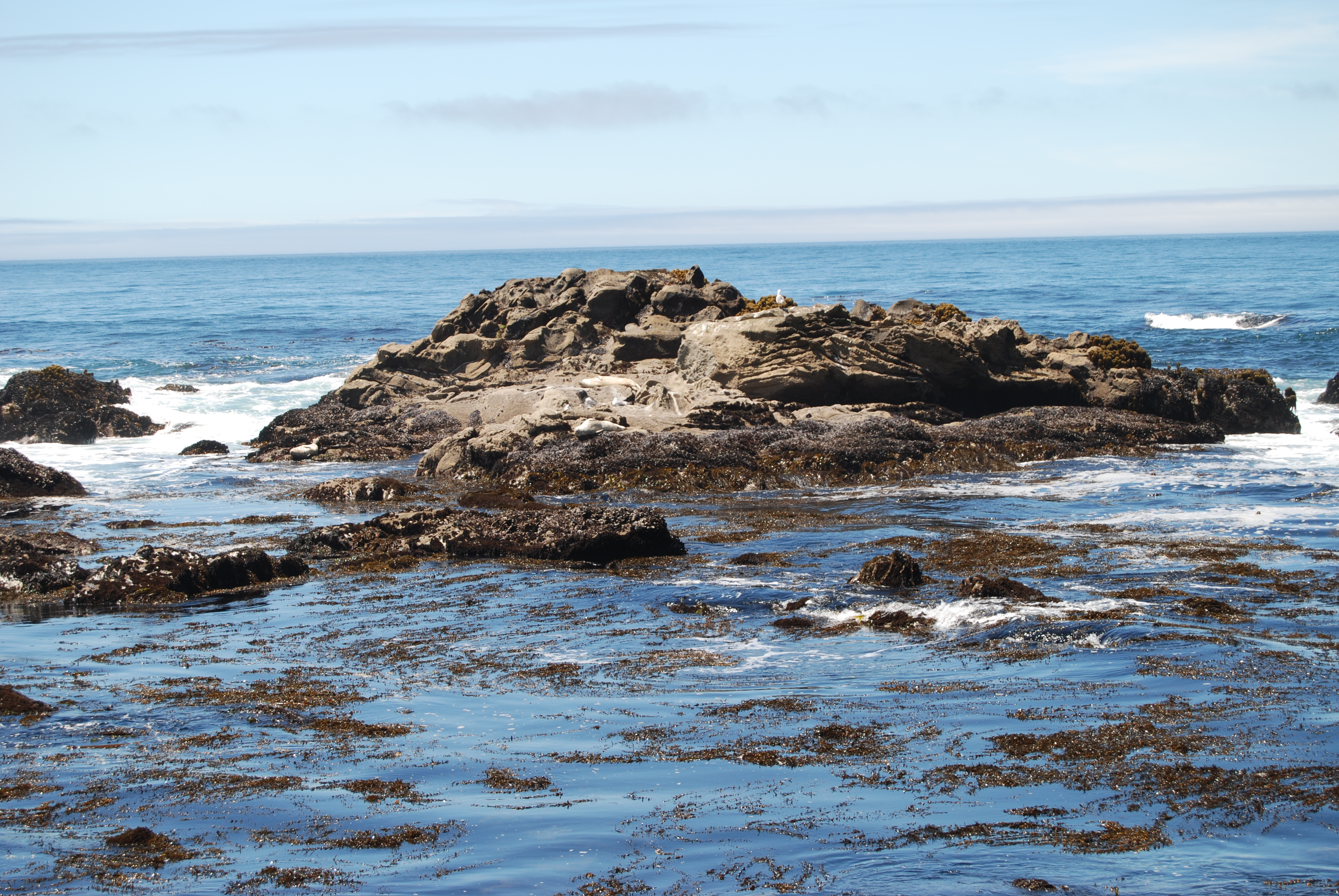
  Salt Point State Park
  - Stump Beach (235621)
- Stillwater Cove Regional Park (235483)
- Fort Ross State Historic Park (223708):
  - Clam Beach (221138)
- Sonoma Coast State Beach (234880):
  - Goat Rock Beach (224252)
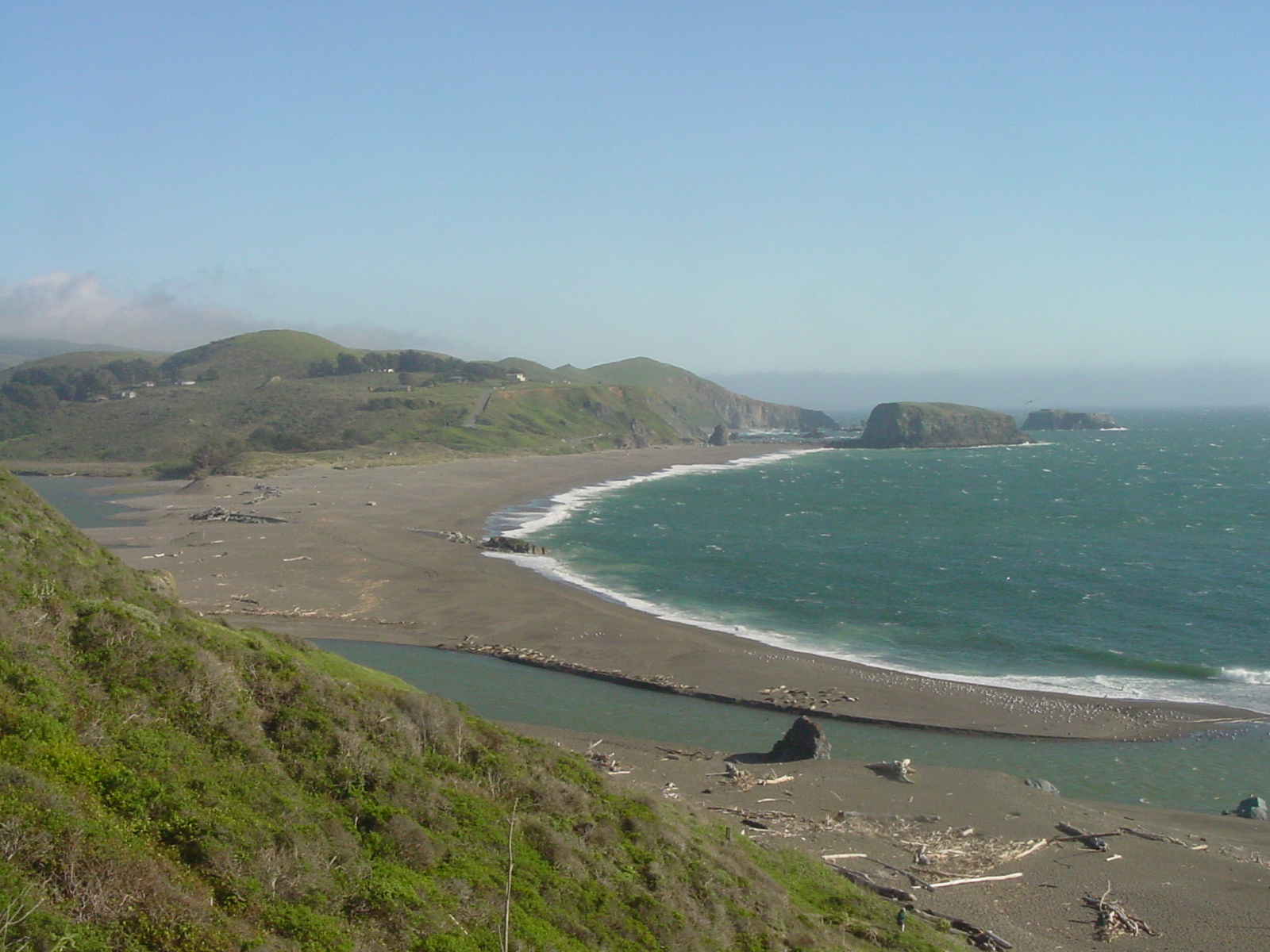
    Russian River
  - Blind Beach (219448)
  - Shell Beach (232932)
  - Wrights Beach (238197)
  - Gleason Beach (224208)
  - Portuguese Beach (230964)
  - Schoolhouse Beach
  - Carmet Beach (220606)
  - Arched Rock Beach (218349)
  - Coleman Beach (221361)
  - Miwok Beach (228878)
  - North Salmon Creek Beach (229754)
  - South Salmon Creek Beach (235107)
- Doran Regional Park (222519):
  - Doran Beach (222518)
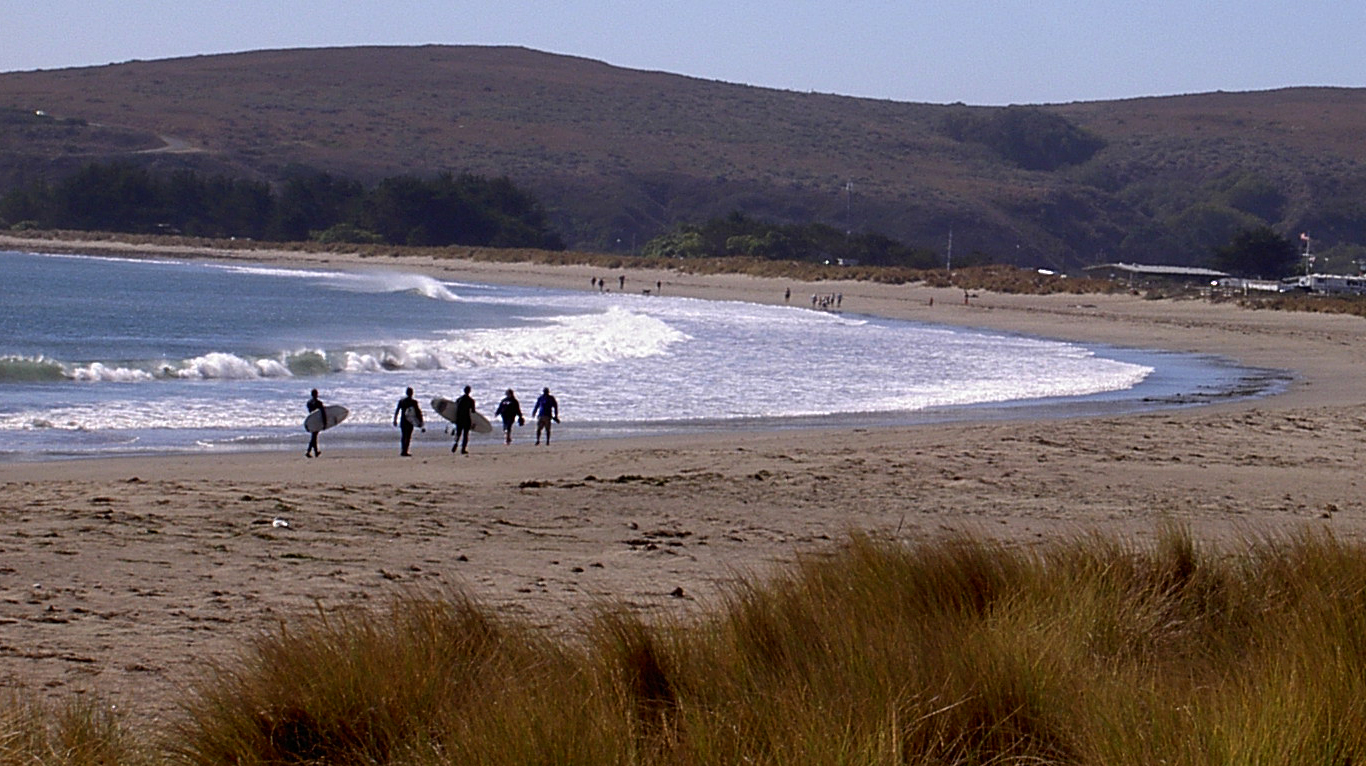
    Doran Beach
- Pinnacle Gulch

=== Sonoma County inland (river) beaches ===
- On the Russian River:
  - Monte Rio Public Beach, in Monte Rio
  - Vacation Beach (1656380)
  - Johnson's Beach, Guerneville
  - Steelhead Beach Regional Park
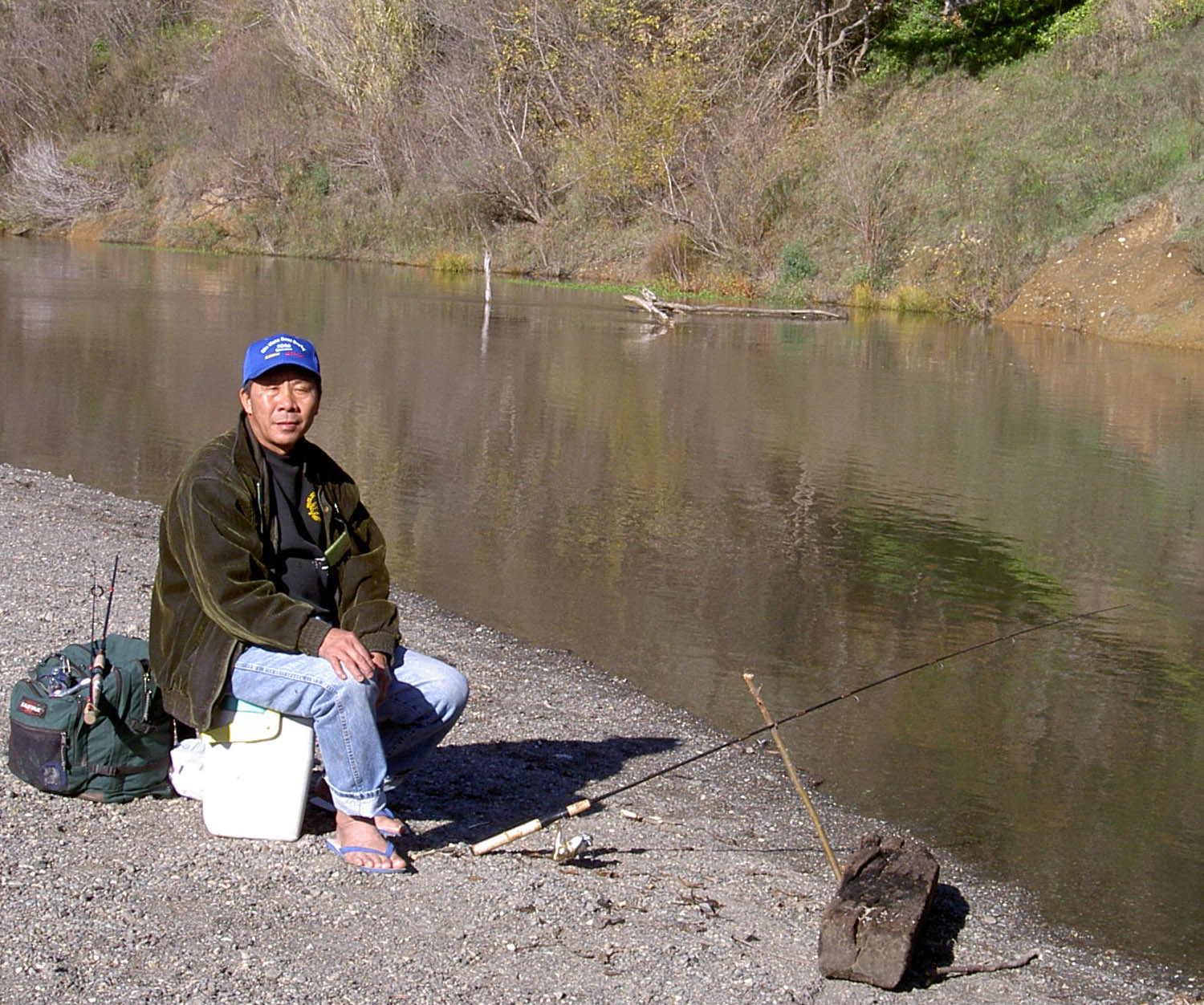
    Steelhead Beach
  - Healdsburg Veterans Memorial Beach (1799231)

=== Marin County ===
- Tomales Bay State Park
- Point Reyes National Seashore
- Mount Tamalpais State Park
- Stinson Beach Park
- Golden Gate National Recreation Area
- Dillon beach
- Muir Beach

=== Contra Costa County ===
- Miller/Knox Beach
- Point Molate beach

=== Alameda County ===
- Albany Beach
- Radio Beach
- Crown Memorial State Beach

=== San Francisco County ===
San Francisco Bay

- Aquatic Park
- Golden Gate National Recreation Area – includes
- East Beach

Pacific Ocean

- Marshall's Beach
- Baker Beach
- China Beach
- Lands End Beach
- Ocean Beach
- Golden Gate National Recreation Area - includes
- Fort Funston Beach

=== San Mateo County ===
- Thornton Beach State Park
- Palisades Park
- Northridge Park
- Mussel Rock Park
- Long View Park
- Beach State Park
- Rockaway Beach
- Tunitas Creek Beach
- Gray Whale Cove State Beach
- Montara State Beach
- El Granada Beach
- Vallejo Beach
- Miramar Beach
- Half Moon Bay State Beach, which includes:
  - Roosevelt Beach (also known as Naples Beach)
  - Dunes Beach
  - Venice Beach
  - Elmar Beach
  - Francis Beach
- Poplar Beach
- Redondo State Beach
- Pelican Point Beach
- Cowell Ranch Beach
- Martins Beach
- San Gregorio Private Beach
- San Gregorio State Beach
- Pomponio State Beach
- Pescadero State Beach
- Pebble Beach
- Bean Hollow State Beach
- Pigeon Point Beach
- Gazos Creek Beach
- Año Nuevo State Park

=== Santa Cruz County ===
- Waddell Creek Beach - Big Basin Redwoods State Park
- Greyhound Rock County Park
- Scott Creek County Beach
- Coast Dairies State Park - Sharktooth, Bonny Doon, Yellow Bank, Laguna Creek, and Panther
- Scaroni Road beach
- Wilder Ranch State Park - Four Mile, Three Mile, Fern Grotto, Wilder
- Natural Bridges State Beach
- Mitchell's Cove Beach
- Lighthouse Field State Beach
- Santa Cruz Beach
- Twin Lakes State Beach
- Capitola City Beach
- New Brighton State Beach
- Seacliff State Beach
- Manresa State Beach
- Sunset State Beach

=== Monterey County ===
- Asilomar State Beach
- Carmel Beach City Park
- Carmel River State Beach
- John Little State Reserve
- Julia Pfeiffer Burns State Park
- Marina State Beach
- Monastery Beach
- Monterey State Beach
- Moss Landing State Beach
- Pebble Beach
- Point Lobos State Reserve
- Point Sur Lightstation State Historic Park
- Salinas River State Beach
- Sand Dollar Beach
- Zmudowski State Beach
  - Pacific Grove
    - Del Monte Beach
    - San Carlos Beach
    - Cabrillo Beach
    - Lover's Point Beach
    - Sunset Beach

=== San Luis Obispo County ===
- William Randolph Hearst Memorial State Beach
- Estero Bluffs State Park
- Cayucos State Beach
- Morro Bay
  - Morro Strand State Beach
  - Morro Rock Beach
  - Morro Bay State Park
- Montaña de Oro State Park
- Ávila Beach
- Pismo State Beach

=== Santa Barbara County ===
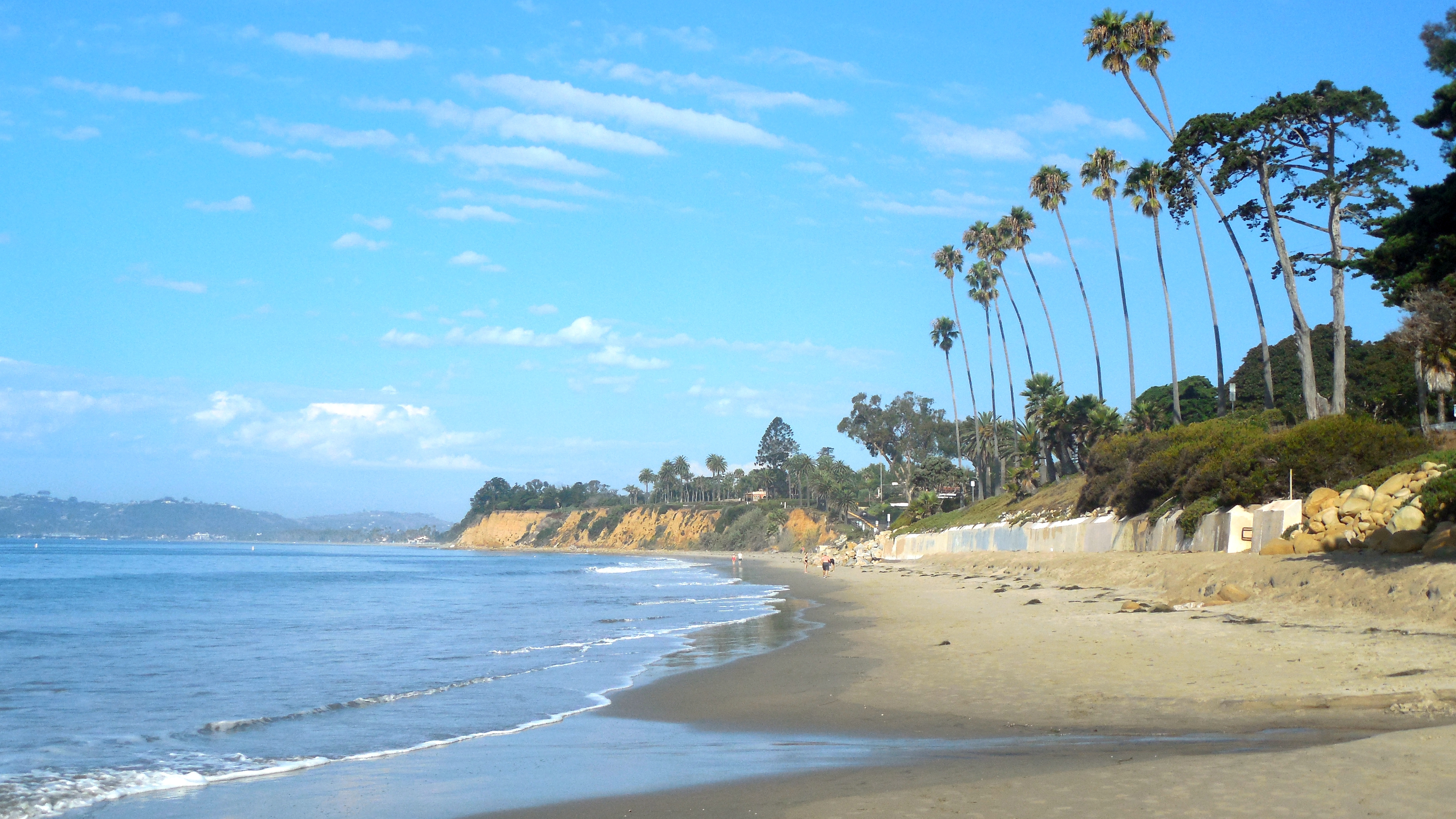
Butterfly Beach, Santa Barbara, California

- Rancho Guadalupe Dunes County Park
- Point Sal State Beach
- Surf Beach
- Jalama Beach County Park
- Jack and Laura Dangermond Preserve
- Hollister Ranch
- Gaviota State Park
- Refugio State Beach
- El Capitán State Beach
- Santa Barbara Shores County Park
- Goleta Beach Park
- Arroyo Burro Beach
- Leadbetter Beach
- West Beach
- East Beach
- Butterfly Beach
- Lookout County Park
- Carpinteria State Beach
- Rincon Beach Park

=== Ventura County ===
- Emma Wood State Beach
- Ventura
  - San Buenaventura State Beach / Ventura Beach
  - Harbor Cove Beach
- McGrath State Beach
- Mandalay State Beach
- Oxnard Beach Park
- Channel Islands Beach
- Silver Strand Beach
- Port Hueneme Beach Park
- Point Mugu State Park
- County Line Beach

=== Los Angeles County ===
- Leo Carrillo State Park
- Robert Meyer Memorial State Beach
- El Pescador State Beach
- La Piedra State Beach
- El Matador State Beach
- Lechuza Beach
- Broad Beach
- Zuma Beach
- Point Dume State Beach
- Malibu Lagoon State Beach
- Topanga State Beach
- Will Rogers State Beach
- Sorrento Beach
- Santa Monica State Beach
- Venice City Beach (Venice, California)
- Charlie Beach
- Playa Del Rey
- Dockweiler State Beach
- El Segundo Beach
- El Porto Beach
- Manhattan Beach County Park
- Hermosa City Beach
- Redondo Beach
  - Redondo Beach State Park
  - Avenue H Beach
  - Burnout Beach
- Torrance County Beach (Torrance, California)
- RAT Beach
- Royal Palms State Beach
- White Point Beach
- Cabrillo Beach Park
- Long Beach
  - Long Beach City Beach
  - Rosie's Dog Beach
  - Alamitos Bay
    - Bayshore Beach
    - Marine Stadium Reserve / Mother's Beach

=== Orange County ===
- Seal Beach
- Surfside Beach
- Sunset Beach
- Huntington Beach
  - Bolsa Chica State Beach
  - Huntington City Beach
  - Huntington State Beach
- Santa Ana River County Beach
- Newport Beach
  - Newport Municipal Beach
  - 10th St Beach
  - 19th St Bay Beach
  - Newport Dunes
  - Bay Back Beach
  - North Star Beach
  - East Beach on Bay Island
  - Balboa Beach
  - West Jetty View Park
  - Bayside Drive County Beach
  - China Cove Beach
  - Rocky Point
  - Corona del Mar State Beach
  - Little Corona del Mar Beach
  - Crystal Cove State Park
- Crescent Bay Point Park
- Shaw's Cove
- Diver's Cove
- Rockpile Beach
- Picnic Beach
- Main Beach
- Brooks Beach
- Victoria Beach
- Laguna Beach
- Aliso Creek County Beach
- West Street Beach
- Thousand Steps Beach
- Salt Creek County Beach
- Doheny State Beach
- Capistrano Beach
- Poche Beach
- Komo Beach
- San Clemente City Beach
- San Clemente State Beach

== State beaches ==
California State Beaches are beaches designated as such by the California Department of Parks and Recreation. State beaches are part of the California State Parks system.

For a more detailed list beaches in the San Diego area, see List of beaches in San Diego, California.

Image	Name	GNIS record	County	State website
	Asilomar State Beach	218439	Monterey	Asilomar SB
	Bean Hollow State Beach	1723270	San Mateo	Bean Hollow SB
	Bolsa Chica State Beach	239536	Orange	Bolsa Chica SB
	Cardiff State Beach	240237	San Diego	Cardiff SB
	Carlsbad State Beach	249687	San Diego	Carlsbad SB
	Carmel River State Beach	220609	Monterey	Carmel River SB
	Carpinteria State Beach	270313	Santa Barbara	Carpinteria SB
	Caspar Headlands State Beach	1724165	Mendocino	Caspar Headlands SB
	Cayucos State Beach	240375	San Luis Obispo	Cayucos SB
	Corona del Mar State Beach	1702603	Orange	Corona Del Mar SB
	Dockweiler State Beach	241524	Los Angeles	Dockweiler SB
	Doheny State Beach	241533	Orange	Doheny SB
	El Capitán State Beach	241880	Santa Barbara	El Capitán SB
	Emma Wood State Beach	1702920	Ventura	Emma Wood SB
	Gray Whale Cove State Beach	1723276	San Mateo	Gray Whale Cove SB
	Greenwood State Beach	1724191	Mendocino	Greenwood SB
	Half Moon Bay State Beach	1786144	San Mateo	Half Moon Bay SB
	Huntington State Beach	243744	Orange	Huntington SB
	Leucadia State Beach	247685	San Diego	Leucadia SB
	Lighthouse Field State Beach	1872836	Santa Cruz	Lighthouse Field SB
	Little River State Beach	227347	Humboldt	Little River SB
	Malibu Lagoon State Beach	1702794	Los Angeles	Malibu Lagoon SB
	Mandalay State Beach	1702925	Ventura	Mandalay SB
	Manresa State Beach	228029	Santa Cruz	Manresa SB
	Marina State Beach	252373	Monterey	Marina SB
	McGrath State Beach	1702928	Ventura	McGrath SB
	Montara State Beach	1723278	San Mateo	Montara SB
	Monterey State Beach	228966	Monterey	Monterey SB
	Moonlight State Beach	246169	San Diego	Moonlight SB
	Morro Strand State Beach	246229	San Luis Obispo	Morro Strand SB
	Moss Landing State Beach	1703619	Monterey	Moss Landing SB
	Natural Bridges State Beach	229428	Santa Cruz	Natural Bridges SB
	New Brighton State Beach	229483	Santa Cruz	New Brighton SB
	Pacifica State Beach		San Mateo	Pacifica SB
	Pelican State Beach	230476	Del Norte	Pelican SB
	Pescadero State Beach	1723284	San Mateo	Pescadero SB
	Pismo State Beach	247580	San Luis Obispo	Pismo SB
	Point Dume State Beach	1702802	Los Angeles	Point Dume SB
	Point Sal State Beach	247646	Santa Barbara	Point Sal SB
	Pomponio State Beach	1723286	San Mateo	Pomponio SB
	Refugio State Beach	248114	Santa Barbara	Refugio SB
	Robert H. Meyer Memorial State Beach		Los Angeles	Robert H. Meyer Memorial SB
	Robert W. Crown Memorial State Beach	1702823	Alameda	Robert W. Crown Memorial SB
	Salinas River State Beach	1703621	Monterey	Salinas River SB
	San Buenaventura State Beach	248809	Ventura	San Buenaventura SB
	San Clemente State Beach	248818	Orange	San Clemente SB
	San Elijo State Beach	248837	San Diego	San Elijo SB
	San Gregorio State Beach	1723289	San Mateo	San Gregorio SB
	San Onofre State Beach	248937	San Diego	San Onofre SB
	Santa Monica State Beach	238365	Los Angeles	Santa Monica SB
	Schooner Gulch State Beach	1724251	Mendocino	Schooner Gulch SB
	Seacliff State Beach	232753	Santa Cruz	Seacliff SB
	Silver Strand State Beach	1702940	San Diego	Silver Strand SB
	South Carlsbad State Beach	249687	San Diego	South Carlsbad SB
	Sunset State Beach	235818	Santa Cruz	Sunset SB
	Thornton State Beach	236292	San Mateo	Thornton SB
	Torrey Pines State Beach	1702728	San Diego	Torrey Pines SB
	Trinidad State Beach	236546	Humboldt	Trinidad SB
	Twin Lakes State Beach	217930	Santa Cruz	Twin Lakes SB
	Westport-Union Landing State Beach	237565	Mendocino	Westport-Union Landing SB
	Will Rogers State Beach	251579	Los Angeles	Will Rogers SB
	William Randolph Hearst Memorial State Beach	243323	San Luis Obispo	William Randolph Hearst Memorial SB
	Zmudowski State Beach	238324	Monterey	Zmudowski SB

== See also ==
- List of beaches in the United States
- List of California state parks
