= Robert W. Crown =

American politician

Robert Crown
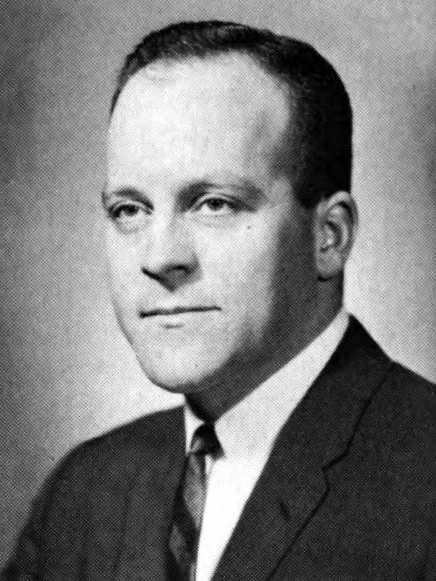

Member of the California State Assembly from the 14th district
- In office January 7, 1957 – May 21, 1973
- Preceded by: Randal Dickey
- Succeeded by: Bill Lockyer

Personal details
- Born: January 23, 1922 San Francisco, California
- Died: May 21, 1973 (aged 51) Alameda, California
- Party: Democratic

Military service
- Branch/service: United States Army
- Battles/wars: World War II

Robert Warren Crown (January 23, 1922 – May 21, 1973) served in the California legislature and, during World War II, he served in the United States Army as an infantry combat platoon leader in France. He won nine elections in a row, and also served as a delegate at the 1960 Democratic National Convention. He was a progressive Democrat, noted for his opposition to the death penalty.

In 1973, he was struck and killed by a motorist while on his regular evening jog.

Crown Memorial State Beach on the island of Alameda is named after him in recognition of his work to preserve the area.
