= William Randolph Hearst Memorial State Beach =

Beach in California, United States

Coordinates: 35°38′35″N 121°11′15″W

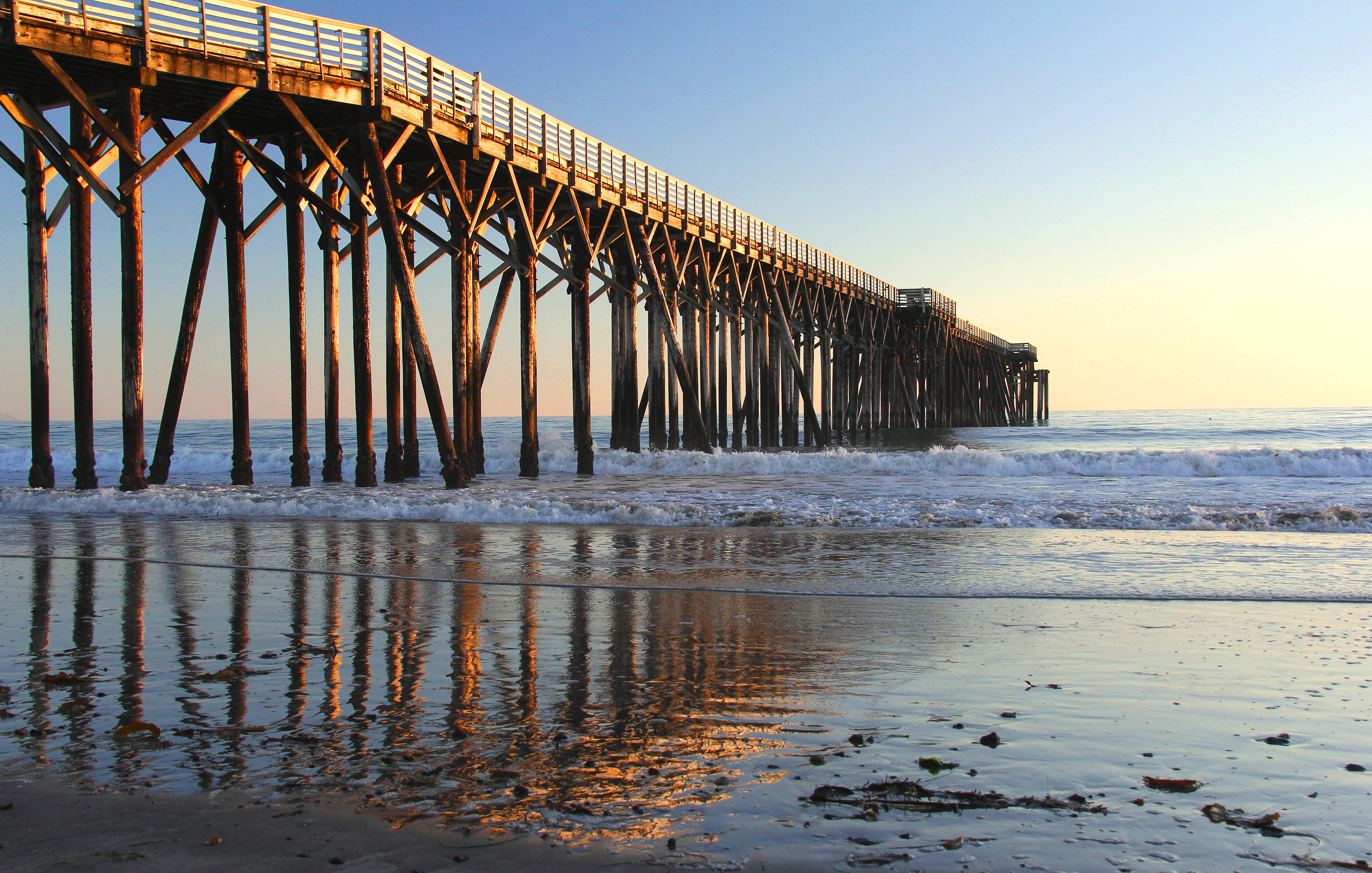
Pier at Hearst State Beach

William Randolph Hearst Memorial State Beach is located near the historic town of San Simeon along California State Route 1, in San Luis Obispo County, California, United States. It is named for newspaper magnate William Randolph Hearst (1863–1951), whose family is closely associated with the area.

== History ==
William Randolph Hearst Memorial State Beach is located in northern San Simeon, California, directly below historic Hearst Castle in San Luis Obispo County. William Randolph Hearst State Beach, or "The Cove" as it is locally known, was the hub of trade and shipping in the area, which was once home to the Hearst family newspaper empire.

Before the 1800s the land was known to be inhabited by the Chumash. In the mid-1830s, Mission San Miguel was built and by the early 1850s a small Portuguese whaling village had been built on the peninsula jutting out into the sea. Over the course of ten years the small village managed to hunt down some 370 whales. Though records of what type of whales were not kept, it is assumed the majority of the whales were gray and humpbacks, as these are the whales that are commonly spotted in the area. This village was short-lived, because only ten years after it was built a severe drought caused the town to move to find fresh water.

George Hearst bought nearly 50,000 acres, establishing the ground work for his son William's empire. The Hearst family owned all the land as far as the eye could see from their castle until the early 1950s when the family donated a huge section of land to the state and sold miles of shoreline to be reserved for public use. The pier George Hearst built in the 1800s no longer exists, but a new one was built in the 1900s just a few hundred yards down the beach that now stands in its place. Today the beach is a California state beach.

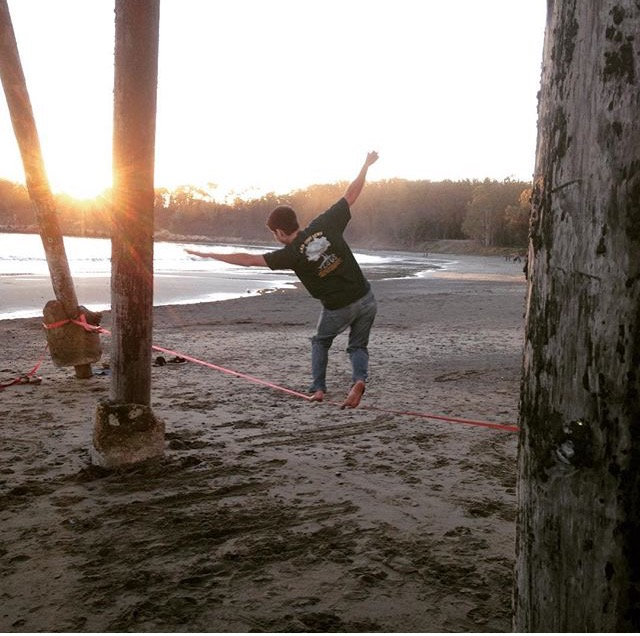
The Cove

== Activities ==
William Randolph Hearst Memorial State Beach is a quiet place with an abundance of wildlife and nature that can be easily viewed. Hearst Memorial State Beach gives visitors the opportunity to hike, swim, fish and beachcomb. A popular beach spot, this protected cove also offers visitors pier fishing as well as kayak fishing, but there is no large boat launch from the beach. Fishing licenses are not required when fishing from the pier but limits are enforced. The beach has a variety of outdoor activities including, kayaking, kayak surfing, paddle boarding, slack lining, hiking, fishing, and swimming. Though kayak surfing is becoming more popular along the beach the water is mostly shore break and therefore it is difficult to surf on a normal surfboard. Located on the beach is a small kayak shop, Sea For Yourself Kayak Outfitter, a shop which provides kayak, paddle board, bike, and other beach gear rentals.

The beach has more than initially meets the eye. Sights include caves, beaches, arches, and an abundance of wildlife. Different types of wildlife that can be seen in the cove over a year include, but are not limited to, gray whales, humpback whales, bottlenose dolphins, sea lions, harbor seals, elephant seals, sea otters, and northern fur seals. Fishing from both the pier and by boat is also popular and common fish that are targeted here include, but are not limited to, rockfish including lingcod, cabezon, vermilion rockfish, and gopher cod. Other fishes include halibut, thresher sharks, smelt, surf perch, and the occasional stingray.

There is also a peninsula that juts out into the ocean that is still Hearst property today. Visitors are allowed to hike the path all the way out to the ocean. Just above the beach in the upper parking lot is a discovery center, which provides information about the history and the local wildlife. Picnic tables, barbecue grills and restrooms are available. This day-use area offers 24 picnic sites, 150 parking spaces, restrooms, water faucets, barbecue grill stands and easy beach access. Recreational activities include picnicking, swimming, fishing, boating, kayaking and sunbathing, including the kayak and boogie board concession in operation with equipment for rent every day from 10 a.m. to 4:30 p.m.

The beach is day-use only; no camping or bonfires are allowed. Gates are closed just after sunset.

== The beach today ==
On any given day you can expect to see people kayaking or paddle boarding on the calm waters of the Cove, or fishing the kelp beds. The beach is divided into two sections: from the parking lot down to the water is all state-owned and -maintained beach, but the other half of the area including the peninsula is private property still owned by the Hearst family today. By California state law, the beach up to the high-tide line is public property, freely accessible to anyone. The residential area is fenced and posted, and there is a signboard on the public trail to San Simeon Point with the rules for public access. No camping or campfires are permitted on the Hearst Ranch property.

The Hearst warehouses are still standing today. Sebastian's is now a small grill serving all grass-fed Hearst beef, but used to serve as a small general store in the 1800s. There are also two newer buildings: one a small kayak rental shop, and the other a small nature and historic museum or discovery center. San Simeon Point, which is still Hearst property today, is covered in trees and has small trails that go out along its edges to its point, where on a clear day you can see the Piedras Blancas Lighthouse tower; it was built in the 1870s and is still in operation today.

== Climate ==
San Simeon has a mild climate, but it fluctuates day to day. During the summer temperatures can be in the nineties, or as low as the fifties on any given day. During the winter the weather is usually mild with temperatures hovering between the low forties and high sixties. On average San Simeon sees only around twenty inches of rain a year. Most days start with a layer of fog that burns off by mid-morning. Once the fog has burned off, the historic Hearst Castle can be seen from the beach.

== See also ==
- Hearst San Simeon State Park
- List of beaches in California
- List of California state parks
