= John Little State Natural Reserve =

Natural area in California, US

- IUCN category V (protected landscape/seascape)
- Location within California Location within the United States
- Location: 55420 Cabrillo Highway, Monterey County, United States
- Nearest city: Cambria, California
- Coordinates: 36°07′N 121°38′W
- Area: 21 acres (8.5 ha)
- Established: 1953
- Governing body: California Department of Parks and Recreation

John Little State Natural Reserve is a small 21-acre (8.5 ha) natural area protecting a section of steep, rugged cliffs and bluffs along the Big Sur coast of California, United States. The reserve encloses the mouth of Lime Creek and contains the 1917 cabin built by Elizabeth K. Livermore, an early conservationist.

== Location ==
It is located 9.5 miles (15.3 km) north of Lucia and 1 mile (1.6 km) south of the Esalen Institute in Monterey County on California State Route 1. A small portion of the reserve extends across Highway 1 at the north end. The park was established in 1953.

== Establishment ==
Elizabeth "Beth" King Livermore was the daughter of Horatio Putnam Livermore and Helen (née Eells), a socially prominent Marin County, California family. She was born on March 9, 1884. John Little owned Slates Hot Springs, one of the first resorts along the Big Sur Coast. He tried his hand at farming the few acres of arable land. Beth Livermore rode a pinto horse into Big Sur and fell in love with the area. She homesteaded a piece of land on a ridge just south of the hot springs and built a cabin in 1917. She worked the land herself, including planting Torrey Pines (Pinus torreyana) on the ridge. In 1909, Little's wife, the former Antoinette (Nettie) McWay, separated from her husband and moved to Pacific Grove, where her children could receive an education. Beth and John Little became romantically involved.

In 1947, Beth Livermore married Matthew Schmidt, who had recently been paroled from San Quentin, where he had been imprisoned for being a getaway driver in the 1910 anarchist bombing of the Los Angeles Times building. On the evening of June 1, 1954 Livermore was fatally injured when she drove her car into Big Creek after visiting friends. Matt, who was in the car with her, unsuccessfully tried to keep her head above water. Livermore left 25 acres (10 ha) and her cabin with instructions that it be used as a state park. Livermore called the property 'Rancho Para Todos' (Ranch For Everyone).

Her wealthy nephews Putnam Livermore was her only heir. He had connections in the California State Parks System from 1950 to 1980. Putnam was a co-founder of the Trust for Public Land. He helped prominent conservationist Harriet Burgess, founder of the American Land Conservancy in San Francisco, transfer the property and turn it into a natural reserve. She instructed that the park be named her friend John Little.

== Access ==
State natural reserves are created to protect natural landscapes, including plants and animals or specific geological features. The reserve has no facilities and is not open to the public. The gated driveway to the Livermore cabin is located south of the Esalen Institute along the Big Sur Coast Highway. There are vehicle pull-outs along the highway with views of the ocean.

== See also ==
- List of beaches in California
- List of California state parks
