= Gray Whale Cove State Beach =

State park in California, United States

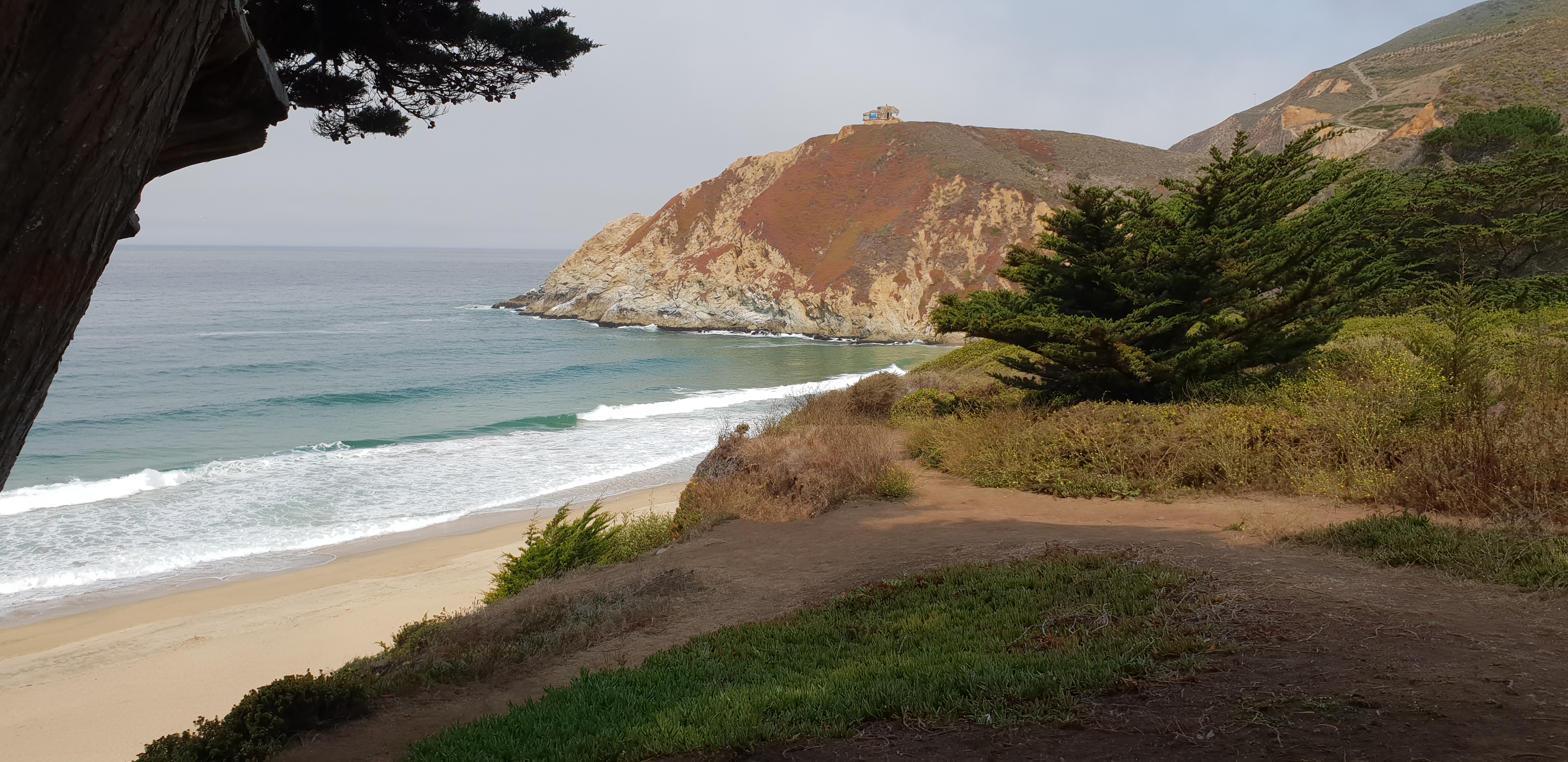

- Location within California Location within the United States
- Location: San Mateo County, California, United States
- Nearest city: Montara, California
- Coordinates: 37°33′56″N 122°30′52″W
- Area: 3.1 acres (1.3 ha)
- Established: 1966
- Governing body: California Department of Parks and Recreation

Gray Whale Cove State Beach is a California State Park between Pacifica, California, and Montara, California, by Highway 1 and approximately 18 miles south of San Francisco. It features a sheltered cove surrounded by abrupt cliffs, with trails connecting to nearby Montara Mountain and McNee Ranch State Park. It is located just south of Devil's Slide. The 3.1-acre (1.3 ha) park was established in 1966.

Montara State Marine Reserve & Pillar Point State Marine Conservation Area extend offshore from Montara, just south of Gray Whale Cove. Like underwater parks, these marine protected areas help conserve ocean wildlife and marine ecosystems.

== See also ==
- List of beaches in California
- List of California state parks
