= Crown Memorial State Beach =

State park in California, United States

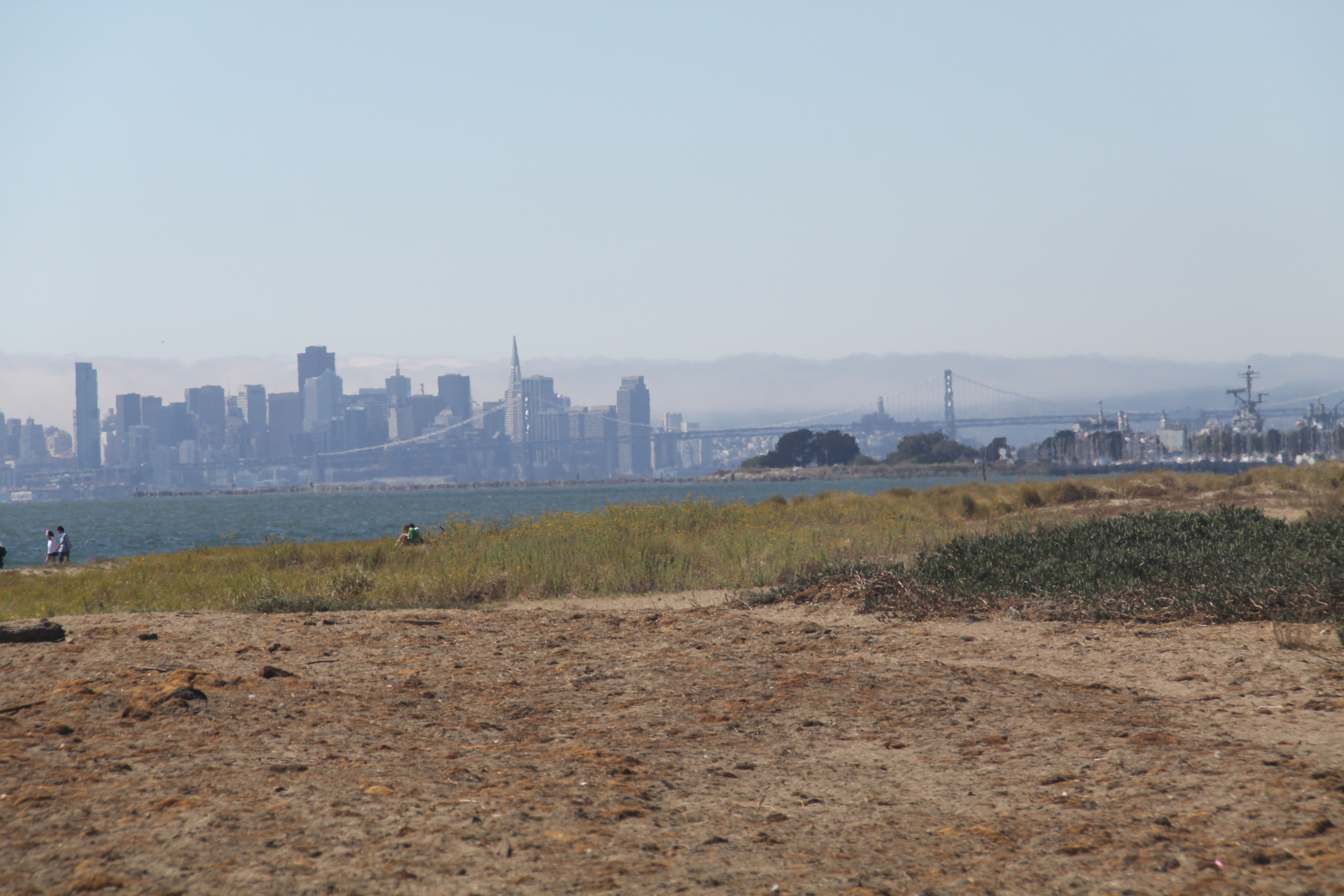
- Crown Memorial State Beach looking towards San Francisco. The city, the Bay Bridge and part of the USS Hornet are visible in the background.
- Interactive map of Crown Memorial State Beach
- Location: Alameda County, California
- Nearest city: Alameda, California
- Operator: East Bay Regional Parks District

Crown Memorial State Beach is a state park in the city of Alameda, California on the shores of San Francisco Bay. It is operated by East Bay Regional Parks District (EBRPD), under a cooperative agreement with the State of California and the City of Alameda.

== Description ==
The park's Crab Cove Visitor Center, at the north end of the beach, features exhibits about the marine life environment of San Francisco Bay, the history of Alameda, and the importance of the Bay. There is an 800-gallon aquarium system with interactive stations for viewing sea creatures up close. Naturalists offer programs for schools and other groups, and weekend nature programs and lectures. The park's visitor center is located at Crab Cove.

The Elsie Roemer Bird Sanctuary, at the east end of the beach, is currently undergoing restoration and is closed to visitors until this work is completed.

== History ==
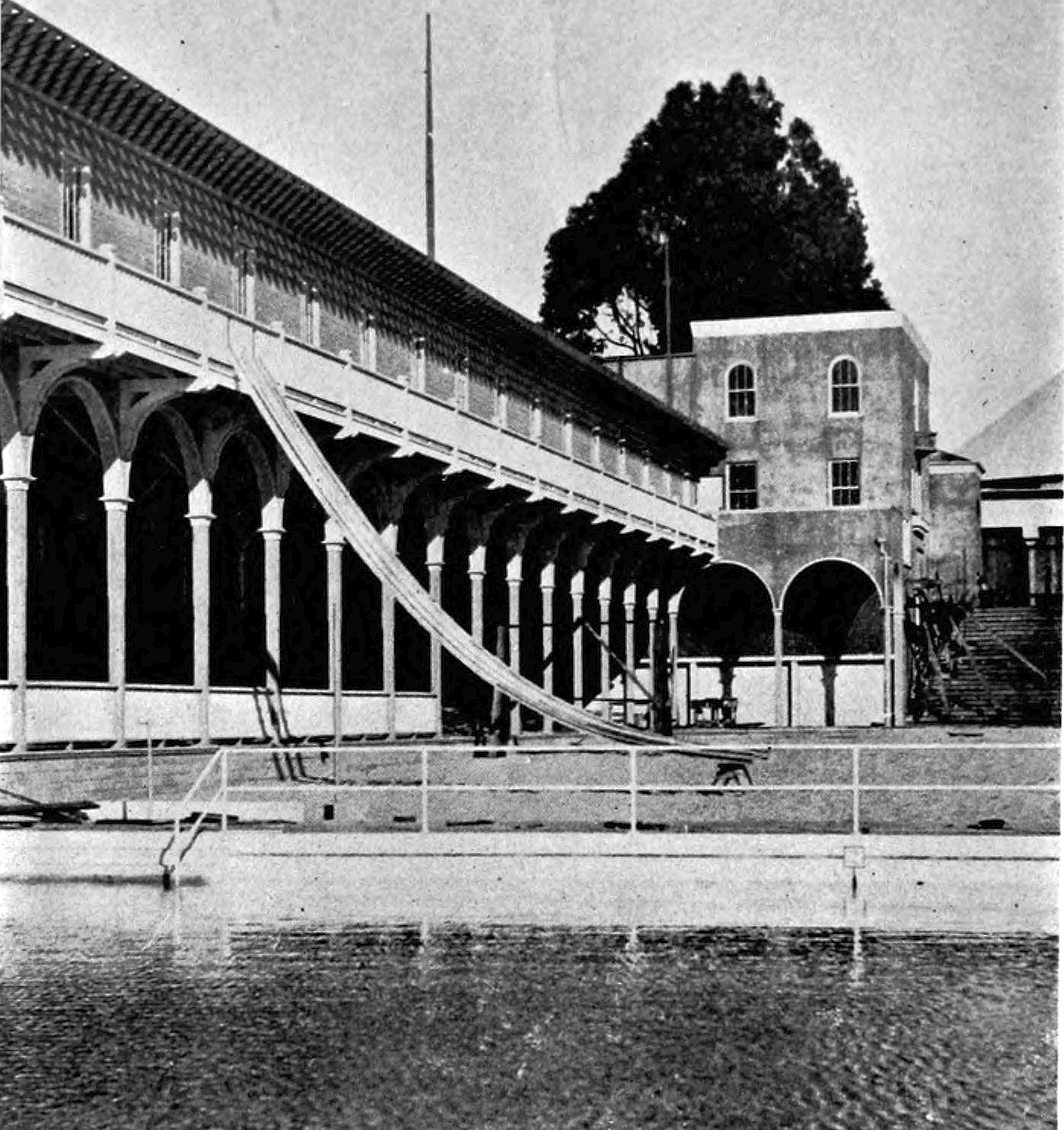
Bathing Pavilion, Neptune Beach, Alameda, California in 1917

From the 1880s until the U.S. entry into World War II in December, 1941, the area around the visitor center was part of Neptune Beach, an amusement park and resort community that featured bathing spas and waterfront houses. It was formally called Alameda Beach and nicknamed "Coney Island of the West." During World War II, the site was used as a training base for Merchant Marine commanders. The park was subsequently known as "Alameda Memorial Beach" until it was renamed for a local politician, Assemblyman Robert W. Crown (1922 – 1973) who was struck and killed by a vehicle while crossing the street. (Note: Crown was honored because he had campaigned for preservation of the beach as a public park.) The current visitor center building was used as the base infirmary.

The beach is 2.5 miles (4.0 km) long. By 1982, it had become dangerously eroded, so a restoration project employed a barge to pump sand from the bay back onto the beach. The restoration was not permanent, even though groin had been installed, and another such project was undertaken in 2013. This project pumped 82,600 cubic yards (63,200 m^{3}) of sand onto shore, restoring the beach and its dunes.

The visitor center's current exhibits opened in 2004. The beach is a popular destination for birdwatchers in the fall and winter. Sea birds such as grebes, ducks, and loons are viewed. Most of the beach received a grade of A or B for year-round water quality in 2010.

In 2015, EBRPD agreed to buy 3 acres (0.012 km^{2}) of land on McKay Avenue that had once housed a U. S. Department of Agriculture (USDA) facility. The price was reported to be $2,182,500. The fate of the parcel, known as Neptune Point, had become quite controversial in 2011, when the General Services Administration (GSA), announced that it would sell the property to a private developer who wished to build 48 private luxury homes adjacent to Crown Memorial Beach Park. Attempting to expedite the sale, the U.S. Government sued the State of California and the park district in an eminent domain action in 2014. The California Attorney General, working with attorneys for EBRPD and California State Parks, countered by asserting that eminent domain could only be used for a public benefit, not for the private benefit of a developer. They proposed an alternative whereby if the proposed sale were allowed, the U. S. Government would have to pay the state and the park agencies $1.4 million in compensation.

== Activities ==
Swimming is allowed year-round during park hours. There is a bathhouse on the west end of the beach. There are no lifeguards.

Crown Memorial State Beach has no boat launch facilities. Windsurfing, kiteboarding, and small craft such as kayaks are permitted.

Access fees are levied for pet dogs. No dogs are allowed on the beach. Visitors are allowed to bring dogs onto lawns and paved pathways, but must be under owner's control at all times and on a leash (maximum length 6 feet (1.8 m)). Owners are expected to clean up after their dog.

Picnic tables and barbecue pits are located next to the bathhouse. Some of these are reservable.

Some areas of the park are accessible by wheelchair. Beach wheelchairs are available on a first-come basis at no charge.

== See also ==
- List of beaches in California
- List of California state parks
