= Twin Lakes State Beach =

State beach in Santa Cruz County, California, United States

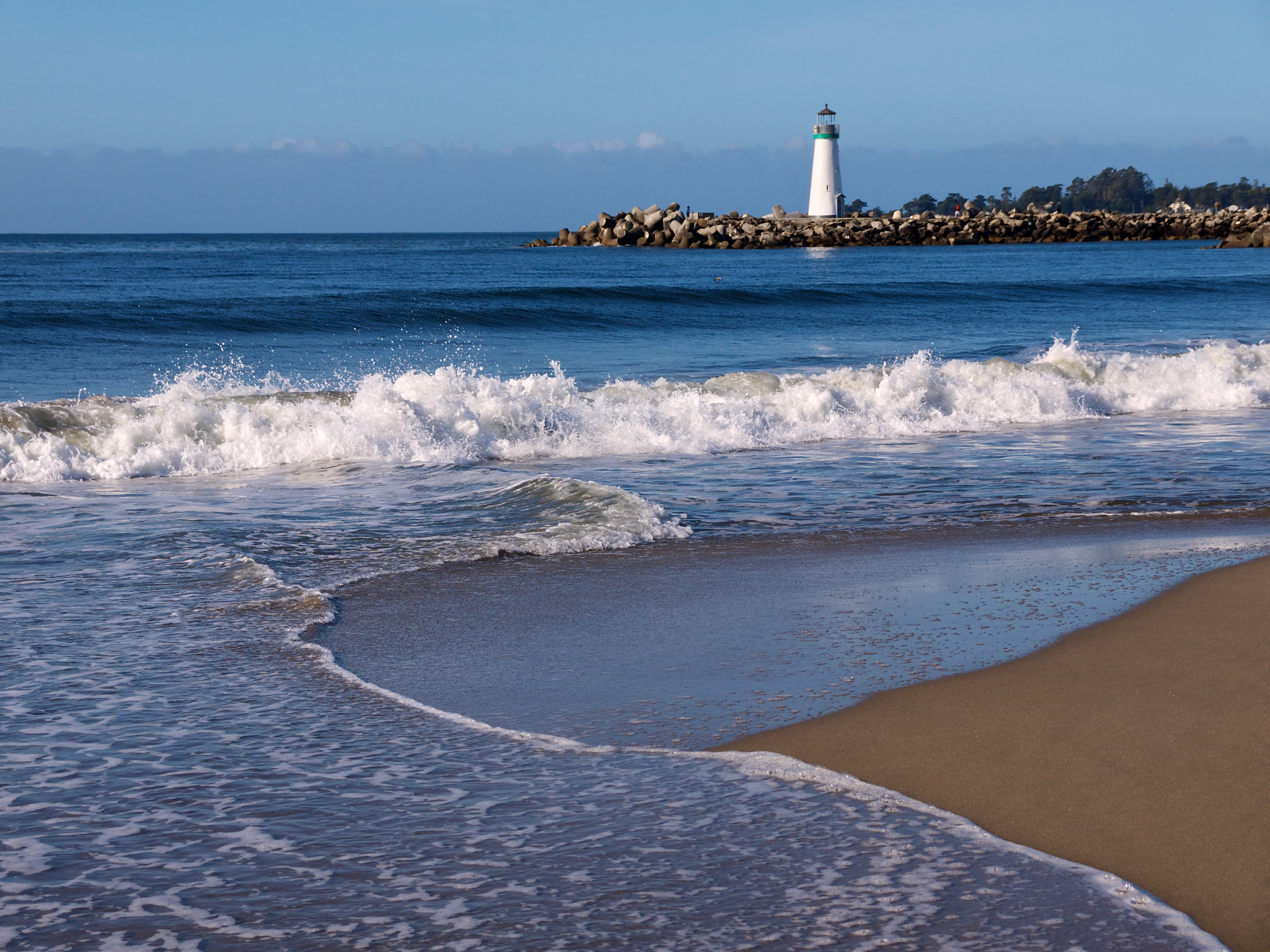

- Location within California Location within the United States
- Location: Santa Cruz, California
- Nearest city: Santa Cruz
- Coordinates: 36°57′44″N 121°59′59″W
- Governing body: California Department of Parks and Recreation

Twin Lakes State Beach is a beach located on Monterey Bay directly south of the Santa Cruz Yacht Harbor Santa Cruz, in coastal Santa Cruz County, northern California.

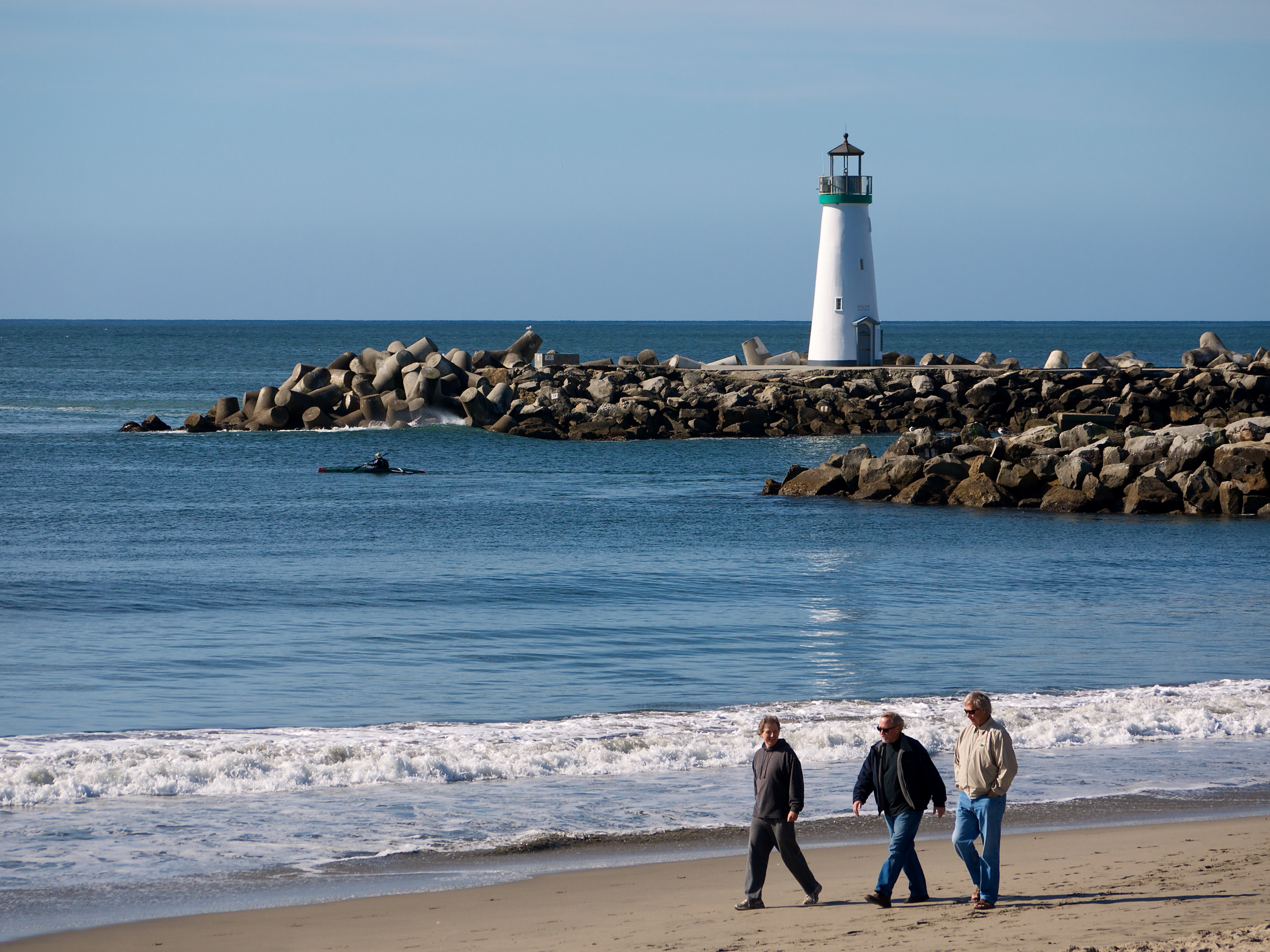
People walking on the beach, with Walton Lighthouse in the background

This one-mile (1.6 km) long shoreline is a popular place for swimming and picnicking, along with birdwatching in the adjacent Schwan's Lake.

It has a small craft harbor parallel to East Cliff and Portola Drives.

== See also ==
- List of beaches in California
- California State Beaches
- List of California state parks
