= Radio Beach =

Beach in Oakland, California, USA

Coordinates: 37°49′32″N 122°19′02″W

The Radio Beach Shoreline is the only beach in Oakland, California. On the San Francisco Bay, it borders the onramp to the Bay Bridge, leading into San Francisco. Its name refers to the radio towers on the beach.

The beach is also known as 'Toll Plaza beach' due to its location next to the toll booths for the Bay Bridge.

It's a popular place among kitesurfers from March to June.

It is a bayfront beach on the north side of the San Francisco Bay Bridge approach past the toll plaza. Views of the bay north of Oakland, Mount Tamalpais, Angel Island and the Tiburon Peninsula can be seen from it.

== See also ==
- List of beaches in California
- List of California state parks
