= Marina State Beach =

State park in California, United States

Coordinates: 36°41′2″N 121°48′46″W

Marina State Beach is a protected beach on Monterey Bay, located in the city of Marina in Monterey County, California.

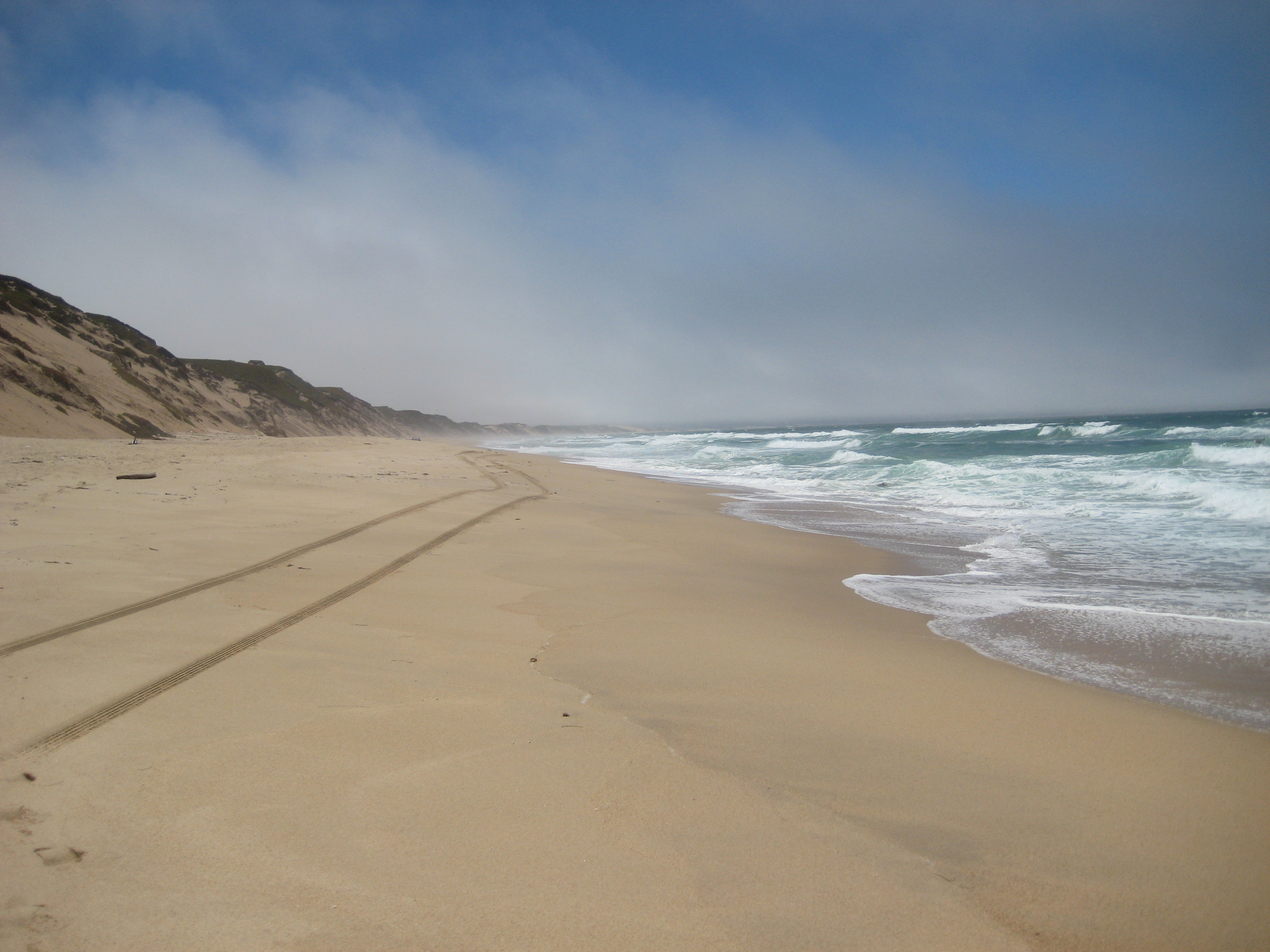
Marina State Beach

== Recreation ==
The park is popular with hang-gliders, paragliders, and kite flyers. It is also a popular spot from which to watch the sun set. Surfers frequent Marina State Beach due to its reliable waves. The 170-acre (69 ha) park was established in 1977.

== Natural history ==
The dunes are some of the highest on the Central California coast, and provide homes to unique wildlife. A short interpretive trail (0.6 miles) provides visitors with information about the habitat and inhabitants of the dunes.

== See also ==
- List of beaches in California
- List of California state parks
  - California State Beaches
- Monterey Bay topics
