= San Clemente State Beach =

State park in California, United States

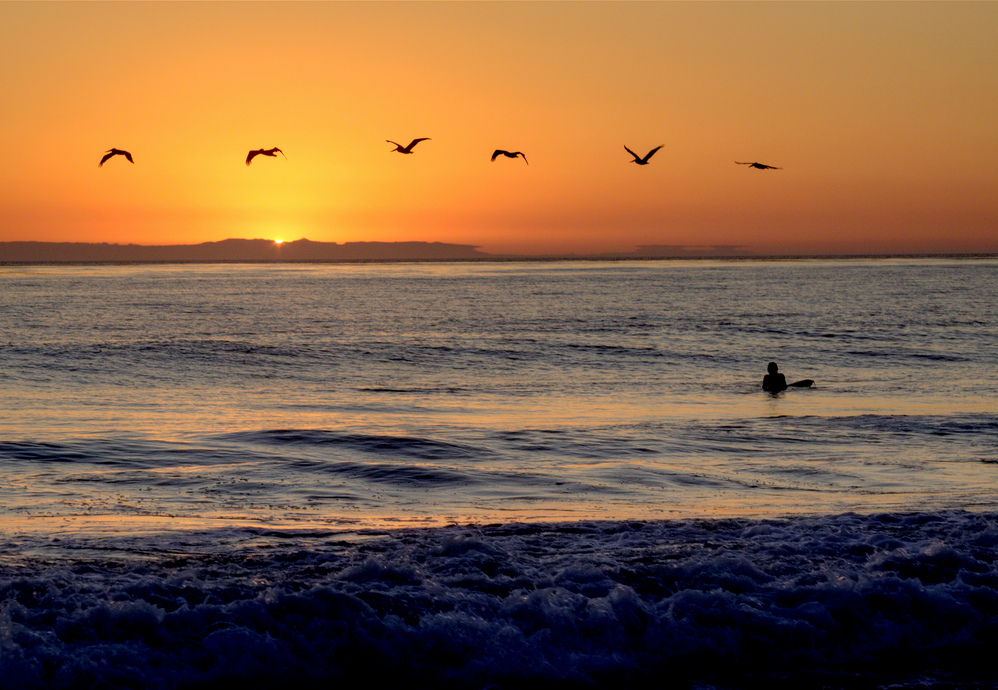

- Location within the Los Angeles metropolitan area Location within California Location within the United States
- Interactive map of San Clemente State Beach
- Location: San Clemente, California
- Nearest city: San Clemente
- Coordinates: 33°24′11″N 117°36′17″W
- Governing body: California Department of Parks and Recreation

San Clemente State Beach is a public beach that is located in the southern end of the city of San Clemente, California, United States. The beach is located at around the halfway point between the cities of Los Angeles and San Diego on the on I-5 Basilone Road.

The beach has been the most popular beach in the state of California since 1937. A significant number of visitors are attracted to this beach due to its intense winds and dramatic locations, including the adjacent Surf Line. Dramatic landscapes such as the rugged sandstone cliffs have been a popular location for field trips. The majority of the beach visitors are water sports enthusiasts such as surfers and those who wish to escape from the inland heat and nearby metropolitan areas for the day.

== Cliffs ==
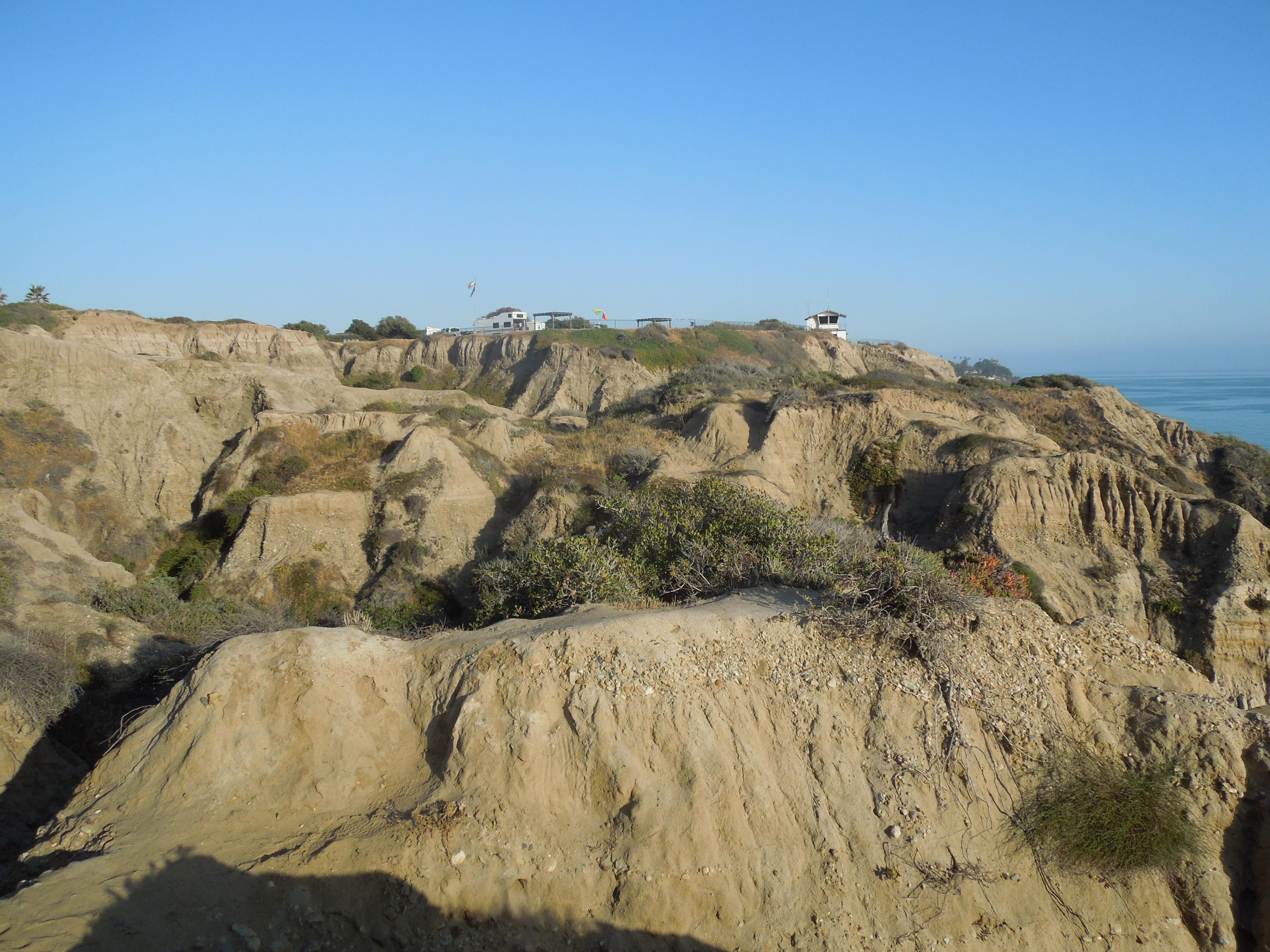
Bluffs located at the San Clemente State Beach.

The beach stretches for roughly a mile. Towering over the beach are rugged sandstone cliffs. The cliffs are dominated by deep scoured surfaces that step laterally from south to north. These surfaces are filled mainly with sandy turbidite beds. The southern margin of the channel complex has incised silty slope mudstones from the Monterey Formation of the Miocene epoch. Currently, there has been no lateral overbank deposits observed. They are able to provide excellent exposure to the sandy turbidite channels of the Capistrano Formation dated to the Miocene.

The cliff channel complex has been interpreted to occupy a gorge that has been eroded into a steep slope on the eastern edge of an active, strike-slip basin. The turbiditie system has been interpreted as the fill of a single turbidite channel that had aggraded subvertically. This interpretation has been based on several lines of evidence such as construction of a detailed photomosaic, mapping of three-dimensional facies distributions, measurement of representative sections and paleocurrent data. The channel would have had a minimum width of around a kilometer and transported material towards the northwest direction. It would have been cut into a low-gradient continental slope less than 1° rather than representing a channel on a submarine fan. It has been proposed that the Gollum channel system can be a modern analog of the turbidite system found at the San Clemente State Beach.

These cliffs have been used by industrial and academic sources as a field laboratory. This includes it being an analog for petroleum reservoirs located in the Los Angeles Basin and other similar areas.

== Wildlife ==
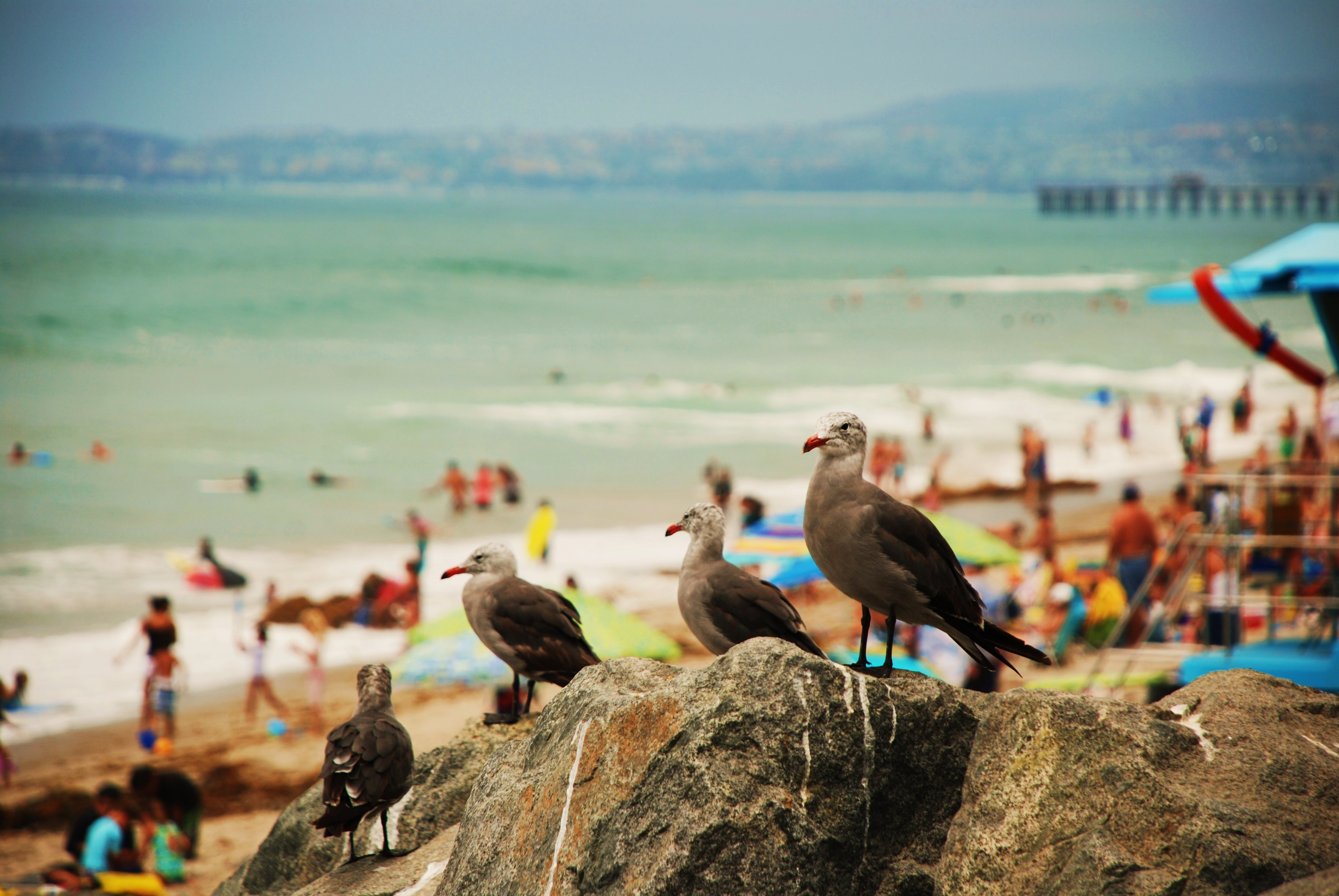
A group of gulls sitting on rocks at the San Clemente State Beach.

The San Clemente State Beach has a variety of terrestrial and marine wildlife that inhabits the area. Many bird species inhabit the beach including western gulls (Larus occidentalis), California gulls (Larus californicus), Hudsonian Whimbrel (Numenius hudsonicus), willets (Tringa semipalmata), sanderlings (Calidris alba), etc. Mammals such as Coyotes (Canis latrans) and foxes are found here. Migrating Monarch butterflies are able to inhabit the beach during the winter months due to the park containing Eucalyptus trees towards the east.

Many aquatic species are known to inhabit the beach including sea lions, common bottlenose dolphins (Tursiops truncatus) and whales can be found here too.

== See also ==
- List of beaches in California
- List of California state parks
