= Manresa State Beach =

State beach in Santa Cruz County, California, United States

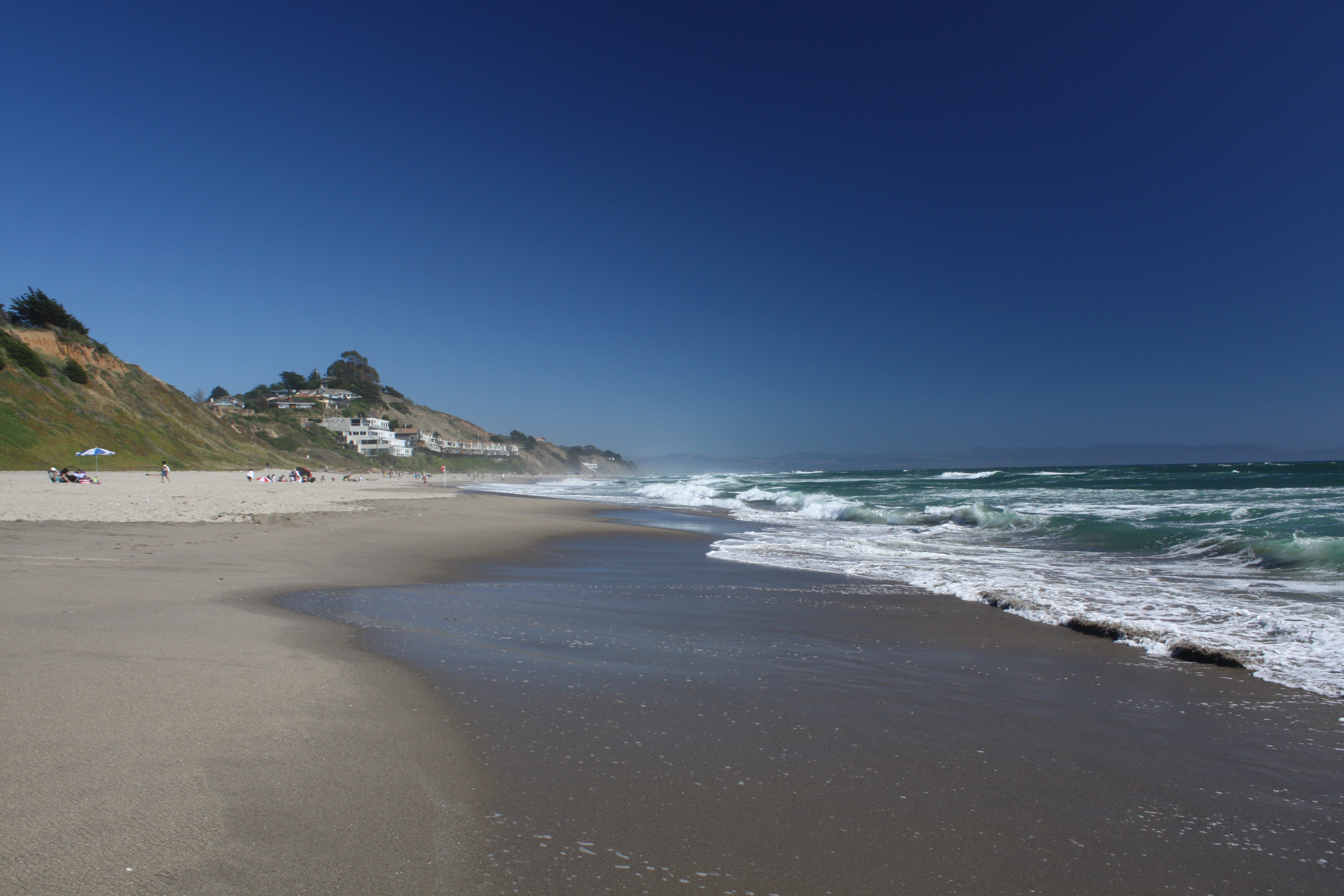
- Manresa State Beach

- Location within California Location within the United States
- Location: Watsonville, United States
- Nearest city: Watsonville
- Coordinates: 36°55′15″N 121°51′23″W
- Area: 138 acres (56 ha)
- Established: 1948
- Governing body: California Department of Parks and Recreation

Manresa State Beach is a state-protected beach on Monterey Bay in La Selva Beach, California near Watsonville in Santa Cruz County. Manresa State Beach has two different State owned and operated facilities associated with it: Manresa Main State Beach, and Manresa Uplands State Beach and Campground. The campground is tent only, hosting 60 sites.

It is operated by the California Department of Parks and Recreation. The 138-acre (56 ha) site was established as a California State Beach in 1948.

Manresa Main State Beach hosts the junior lifeguard program which teaches lifesaving, fitness and water safety to children.

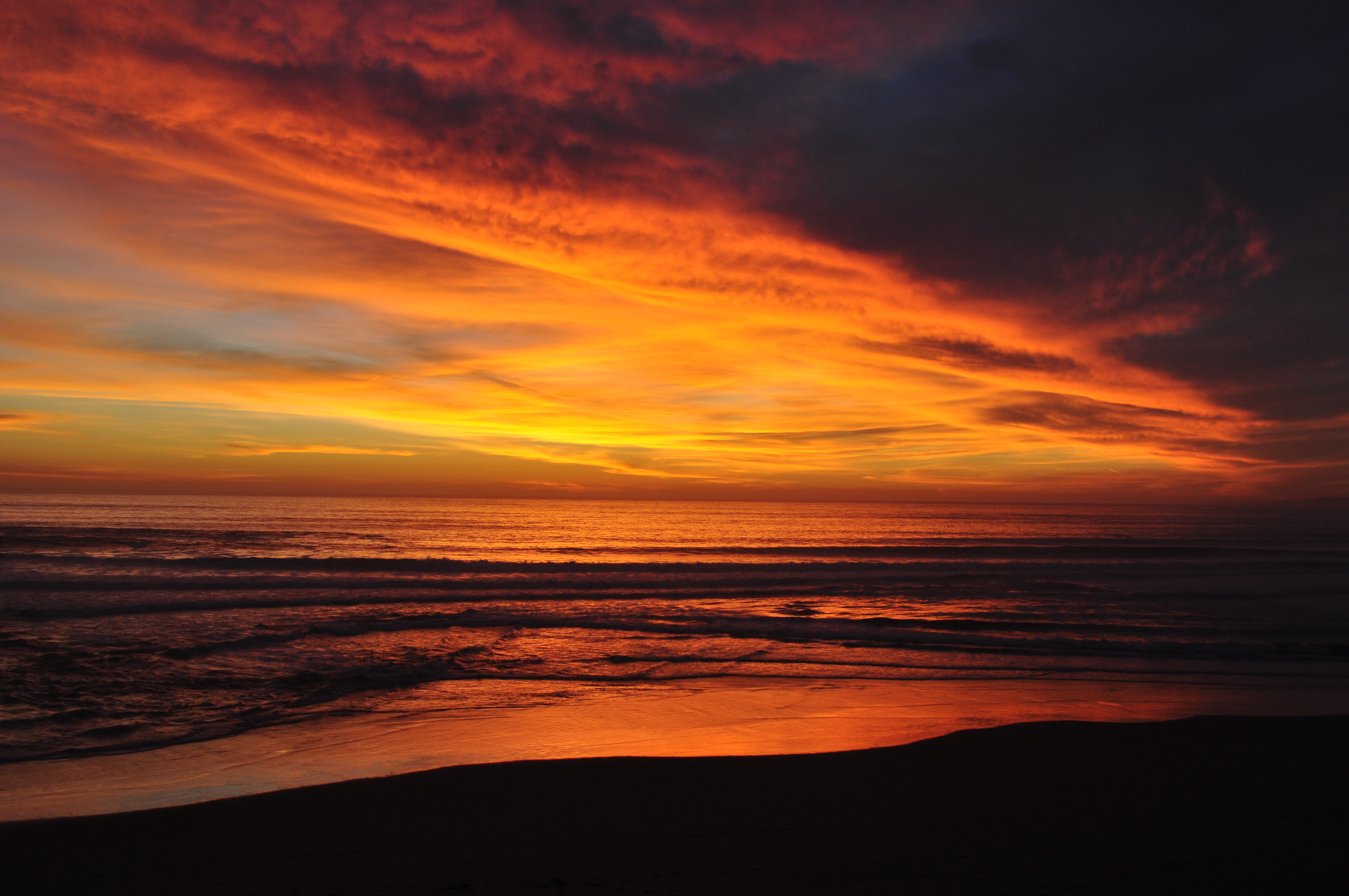

== See also ==
- List of beaches in California
- List of California state parks
  - California State Beaches
- Manresa, a city in the region of Catalonia, Spain
