= Redwood Grove (Henry Cowell Redwoods State Park) =

Grove of Coast Redwoods in northern California

Coordinates: 37.038°N 122.061°W

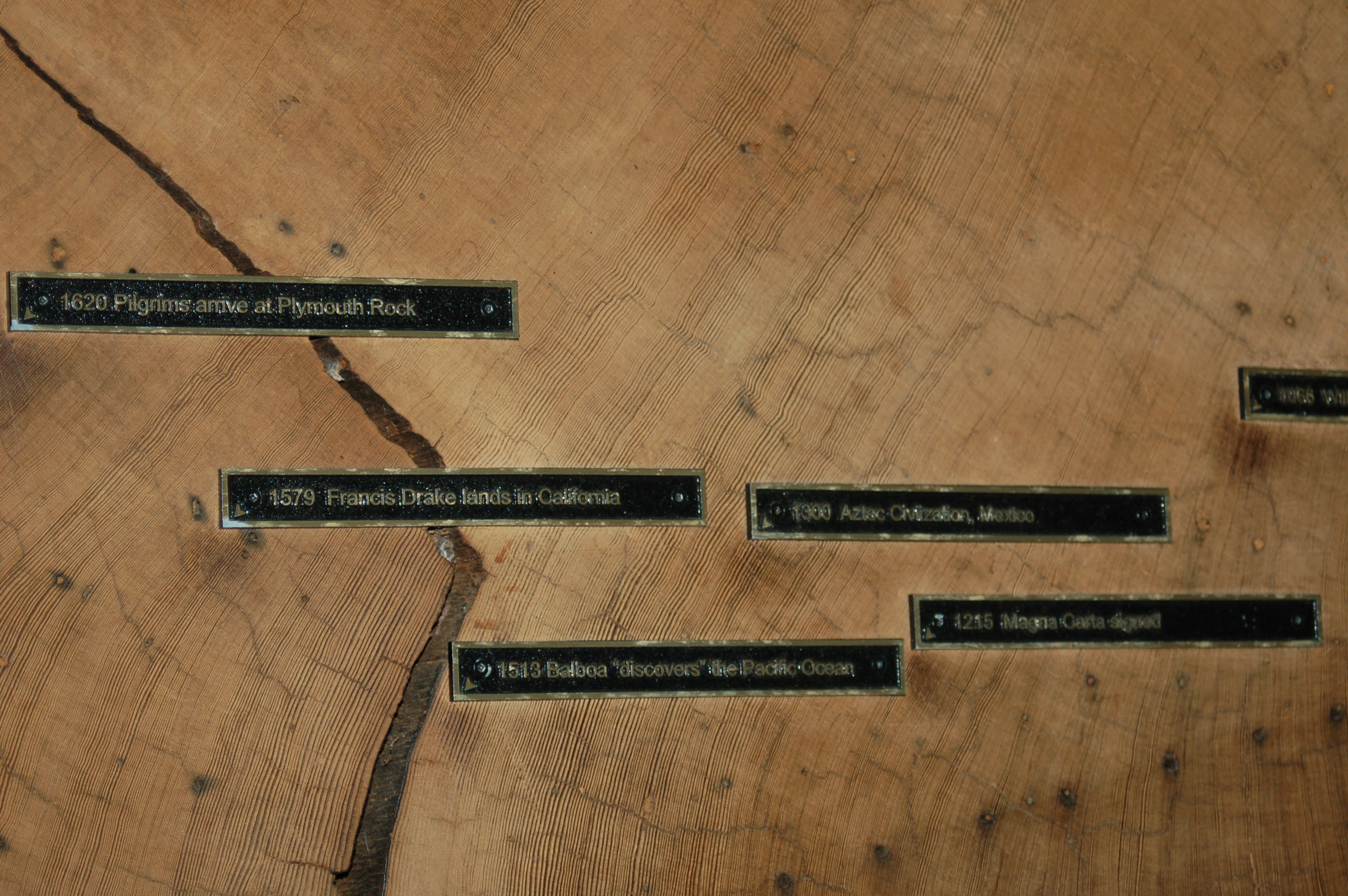
A slice of a Coastal Redwood showing rings marking the years of 1215–1620 AD

The Redwood Grove of Henry Cowell Redwoods State Park, which is located in Santa Cruz County in Northern California, is a grove of Coast Redwoods with trees extending into the 1400- to 1800-year-old range. This grove allows for the use of self-guided tours of the flat, 0.8-mile (1.3 km) loop trail which is easily accessible (within 150 feet (46 m) of a vehicle parking lot). Dozens of large, Redwood trees are located within a few feet of the walking trail.

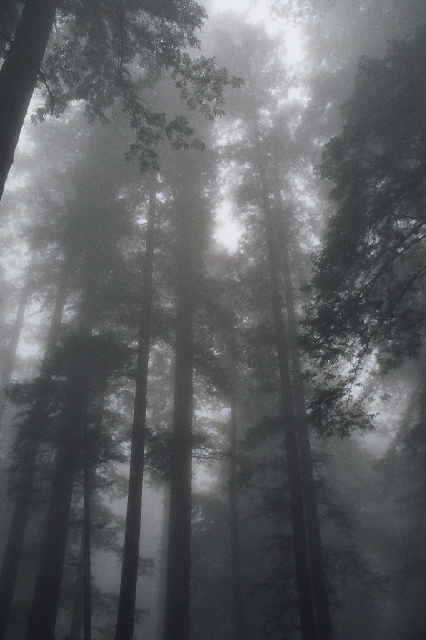
Fog is of major importance in Coast Redwood ecology. Redwood National Park.

== Natural history ==
Coast Redwoods, (Sequoia sempervirens), are a native tree in the deep valleys and low to middle elevations (up to 750 m) of the Santa Cruz Mountains. Their growth and longevity is enhanced by the proximity to the ocean, the cool air which encourages fog, and the dimmer sunlight near the moisture-rich trunk-base region. Free-flowing, year-round streams help to enhance this environment and the cool, moisture-laden air often produces visible fog, which helps to replenish the trees. The bark of these giants is heavily laden with tannin, which helps to offer protection from damage both from wildfires and insects.

This grove has some of the tallest and oldest trees in the Henry Cowell Redwoods State Park. Undergrowth is never cleared, there is no logging allowed and deadfalls and lightning-struck trees are allowed to proceed naturally with their processes, unless they impair access to the grove. This rich, biotic environment is filled with natural nutrients. Old growth groves such as this will show the birth (shoots and burls) and death (rotting trees and "fairy rings") of ancient redwoods, many of whose birth was before the Battle of Hastings in 1066.

== Early history ==
This part of the California Coastline is the ancestral lands of the Awaswas (Santa Cruz) division of Ohlone Indian people. In 1769, Gaspar de Portolà camped on the banks of the San Lorenzo River as part of his exploration for Spain. Twenty years after the Friars Minor came to the area, the, Mission Santa Cruz was consecrated nearby in 1791.

After the Mexican War of Independence in 1821, the newly independent Mexico assumed control of this area until the transfer to the United States in 1846. During Mexican ownership, it was common for land grants to be sold to those who were in favor with the government. Large portions of this virgin-forested area were given out as Rancho Carbonera, Rancho Zayante and Rancho Cañada del Rincon en el Rio San Lorenzo. These "gifted" land grants were the start of European settlement in the area. In 1843, the Mexican Government granted a parcel of 8,800 acres (36 km^{2}) under the name of Rancho Cañada del Rincon en el Rio San Lorenzo de Santa Cruz to a French immigrant named Pedro Sansevain which essentially encompasses the lands of the state park. After a few transfers of land over about twenty years, the granted Rancho Cañada del Rincon ended up in the hands of Henry Cowell.

== Trail Details ==
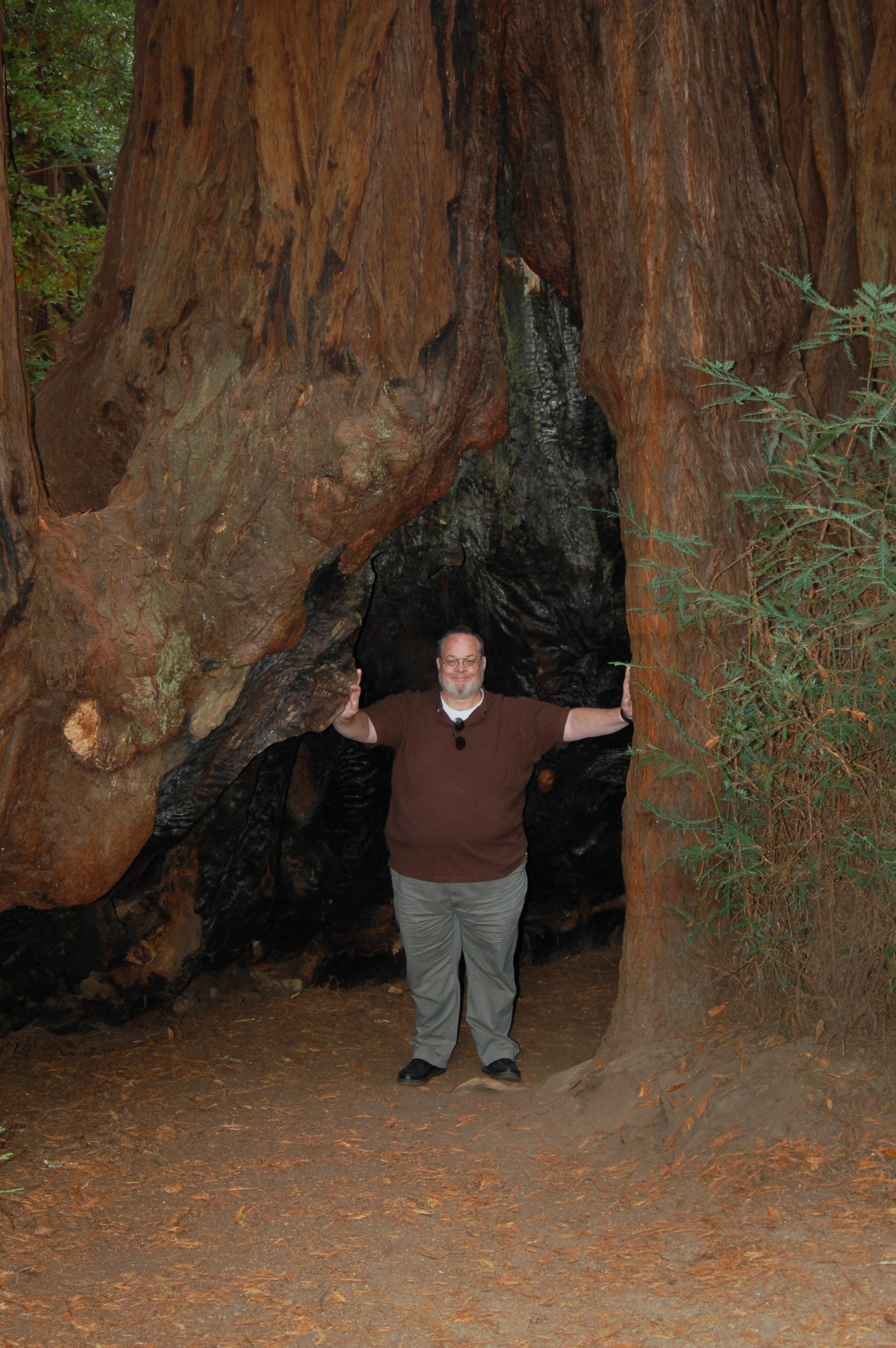
A large burn-scar at the base of a redwood tree showing the fire-retardant and healing properties of the bark.

1. Coastal Zone Environment The Coastal Redwoods grow exceptionally well in this temperate, foggy environment. This is the perfect environment for the trees, since it is moist, dim and far enough from the coast so that there is no salt in the air.
2. The red color of Redwood Trees? These trees have a much higher level of tannic acid in their bark than other trees, giving them the red color.
3. Fire Resistance The high level of tannic acid in the wood and bark in combination with the thickness of the bark (6–12") help to provide a resistance to natural and man-made fires. The growth layer, protected by the thick bark, allow a healing process to occur after damage.
4. Other Species Douglas Firs are often found interspersed with Coastal Redwoods as they are adapted to the same environment.
5. Circular Groups "Fairy Rings" and "Cathedral Groups" are typically see in Redwood forests as examples of the incredible rejuvenating ability of these species. The death of a tree often results in the growth of a number of new trees in a ring around the nutrients-rich, decaying center. Burls from the original tree as well as seeds which have fallen at the base of the trunk provide this new life. The missing central tree allows for a "hole" in the vegetative canopy so that the new plants has sufficient light for growth.
6. Decaying Trees Since this is a protected area, trees which have fallen to the ground are allowed to decay and provide shelter for insects. This results in further nutrients for the remaining live trees in the area.
7. 280 feet tall The largest tree in the grove has a diameter of over 17 feet (5.2 m) in order to support a height of 280 feet (85 m).
8. The Fremont Tree. The story is told that in 1846, when Lt. John C. Fremont explored this part of California, he and his party camped overnight in the burned-out base of this tree. The interior is larger than the typical military tent of the 1840s, which would have offered a splendid shelter for several adults. When asked to confirm the story during and interview in 1888, his comment was, "It makes a great story, let it stand."
9. Burls These wart-like bumps which appear on the sides of the trunk and roots of Redwood trees are a part of the growth layer of the tree. Often small shoots will grow from burls and roots which result, over time, in significant reforestation.
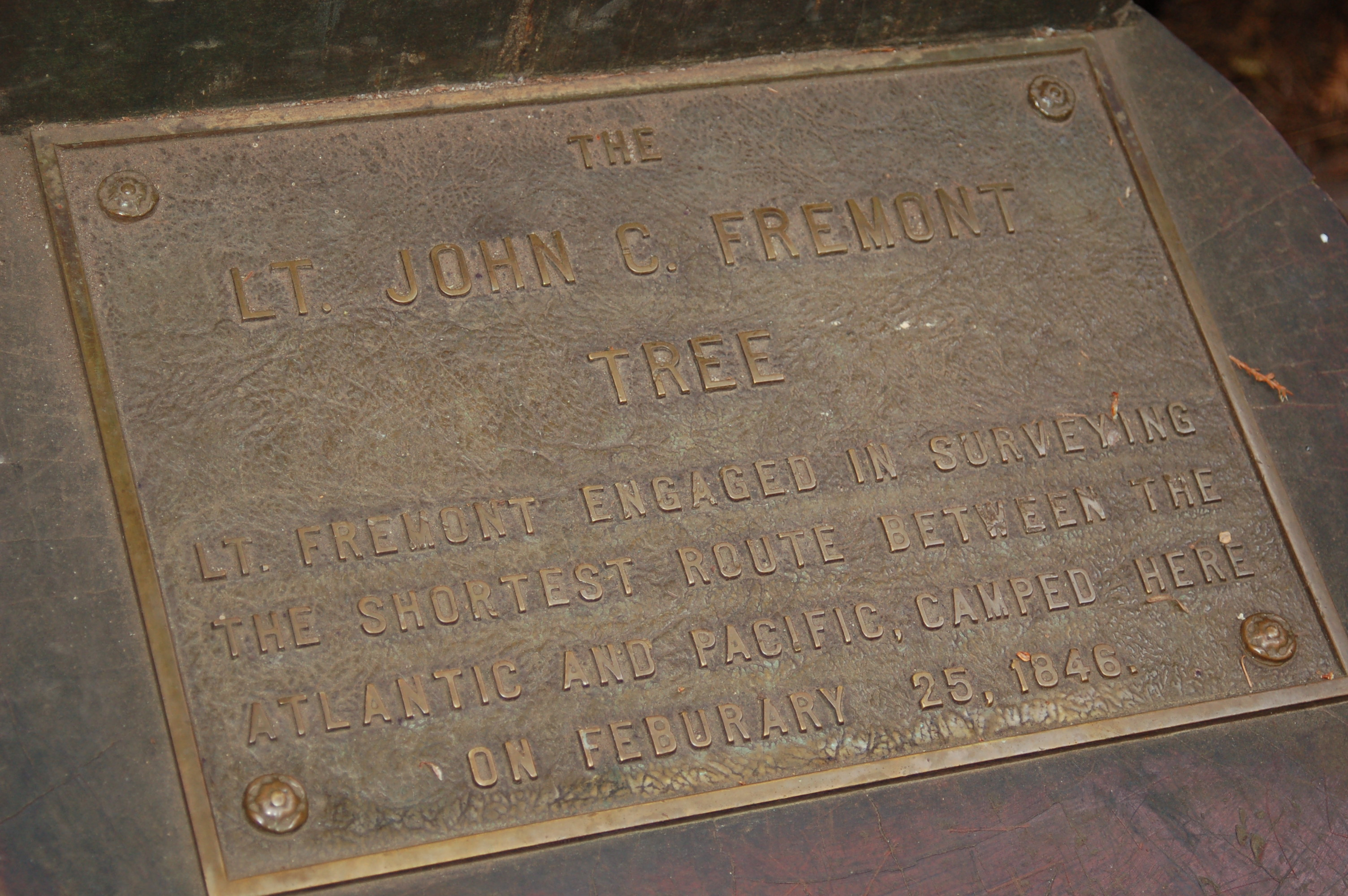
Henry Cowell Redwoods State Park, Redwood Grove. The plaque in front of the Coast Redwood tree inside of which Lt. John. C. Fremont camped in 1846.

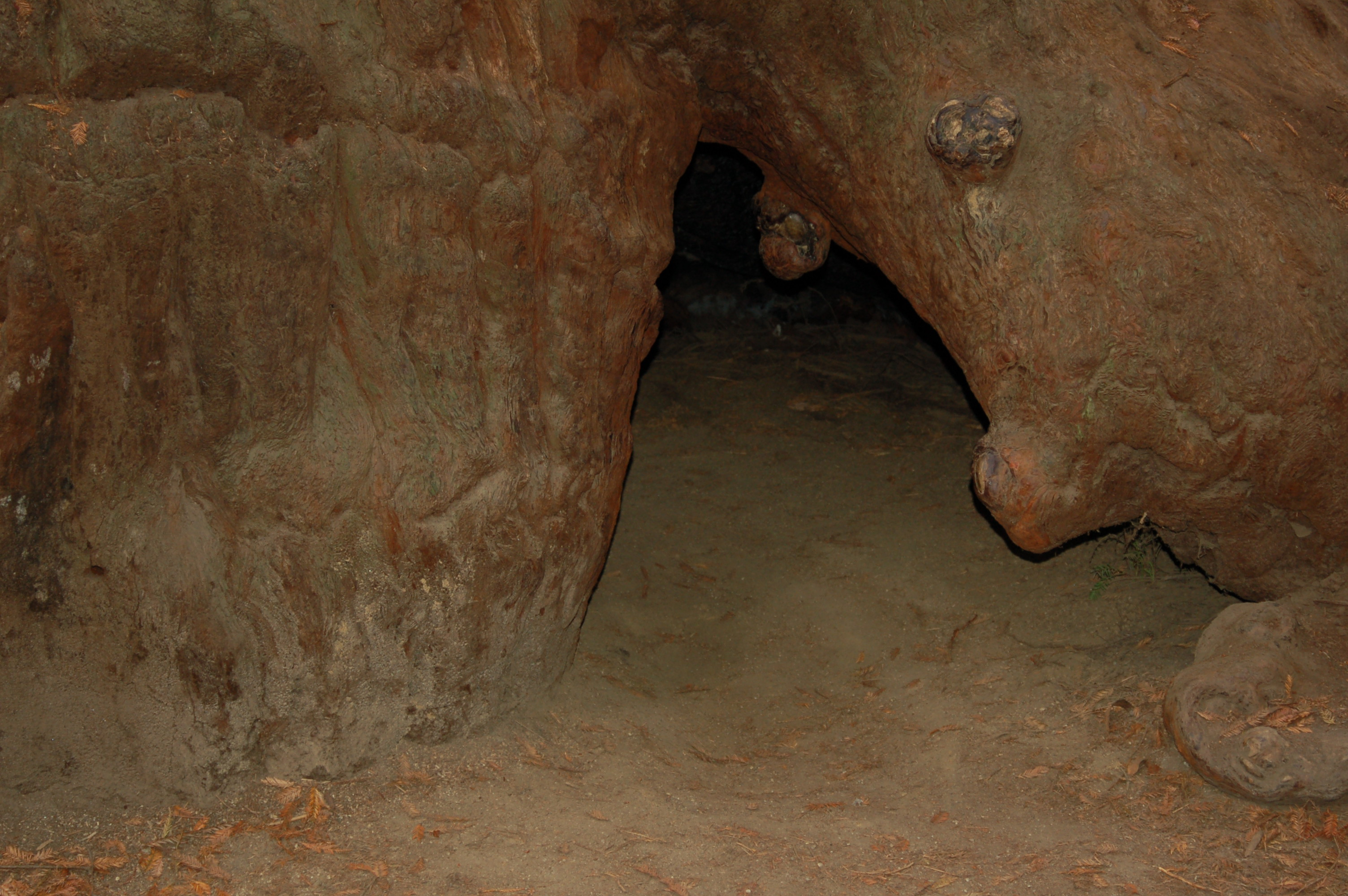
Henry Cowell Redwoods State Park, Redwood Grove. The burned-out base of a redwood tree within which Lt. John. C. Fremont camped in 1846 (large enough for two adults to shelter in comfort). Notice the rounded burl growths.

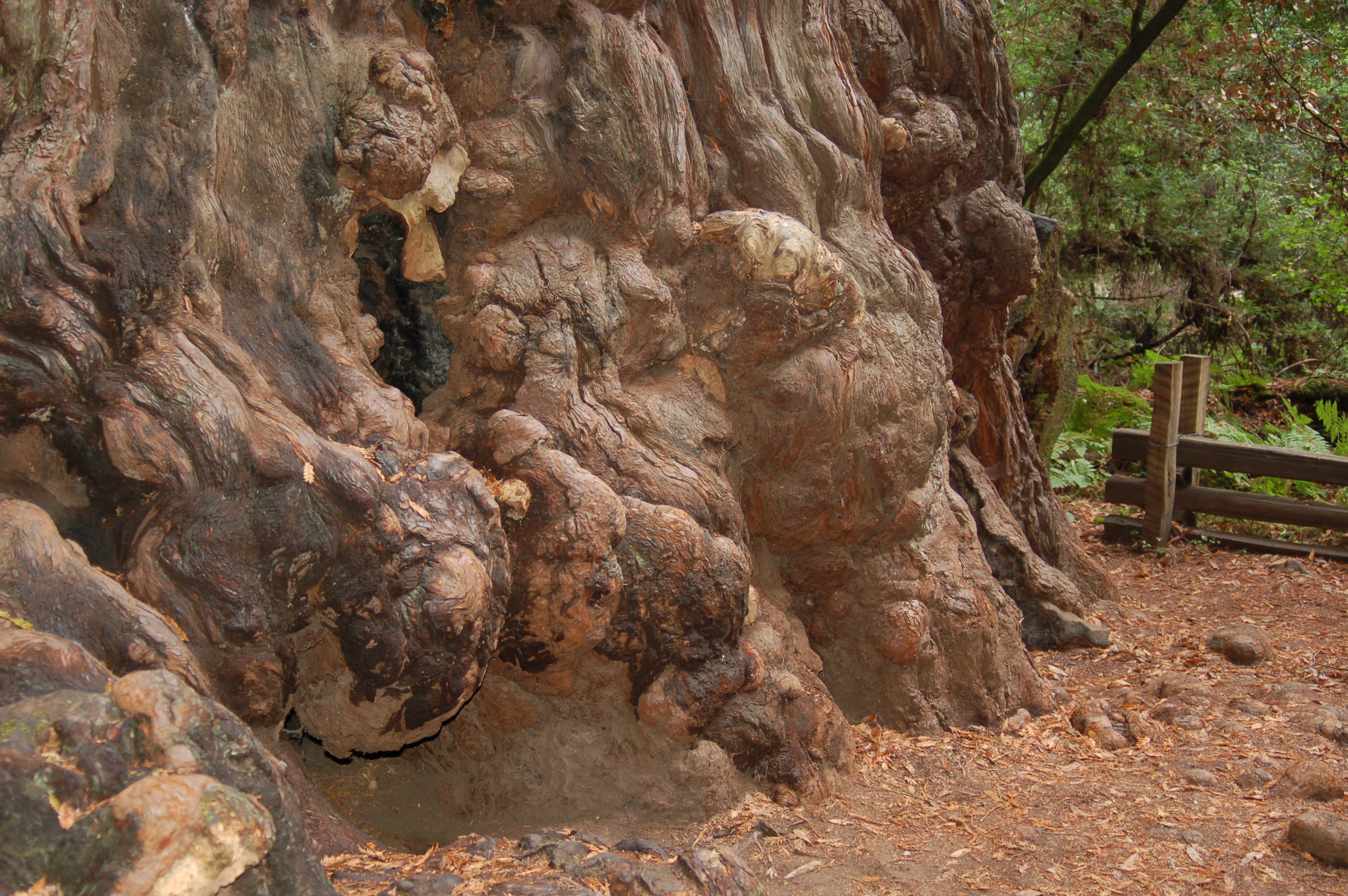
Several large burls formed on the base of a redwood tree showing the unusual regeneration method used by redwoods.

== Hazards ==
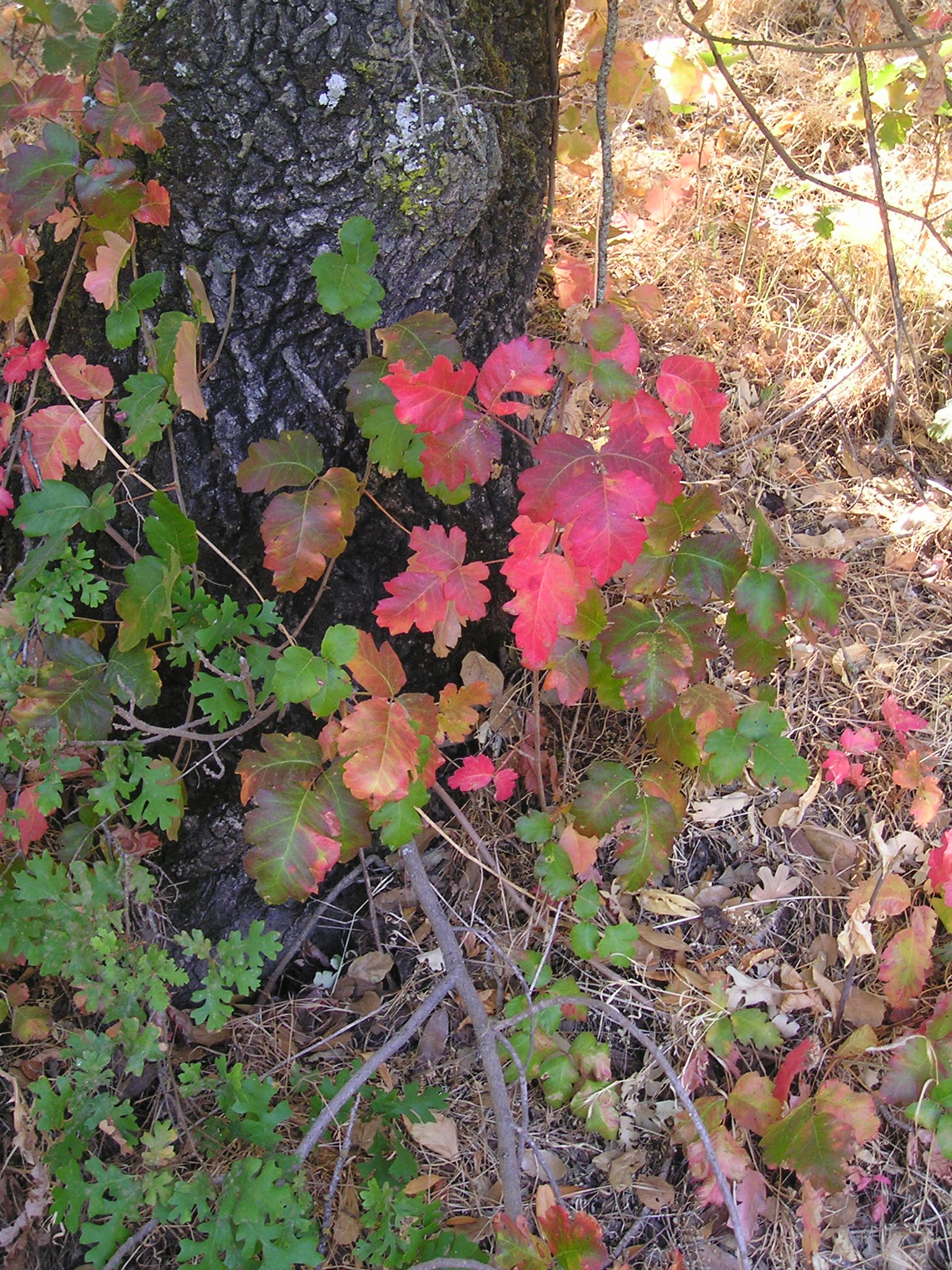
Rash-causing poison oak abounds in the grove.

Poison oak is a native ground-cover in the Santa Cruz Mountains. The plants are most obvious during the part of the year when the leaves change color toward the red spectrum.

== Gallery ==
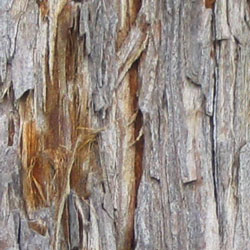
Close view of Coast Redwood bark.

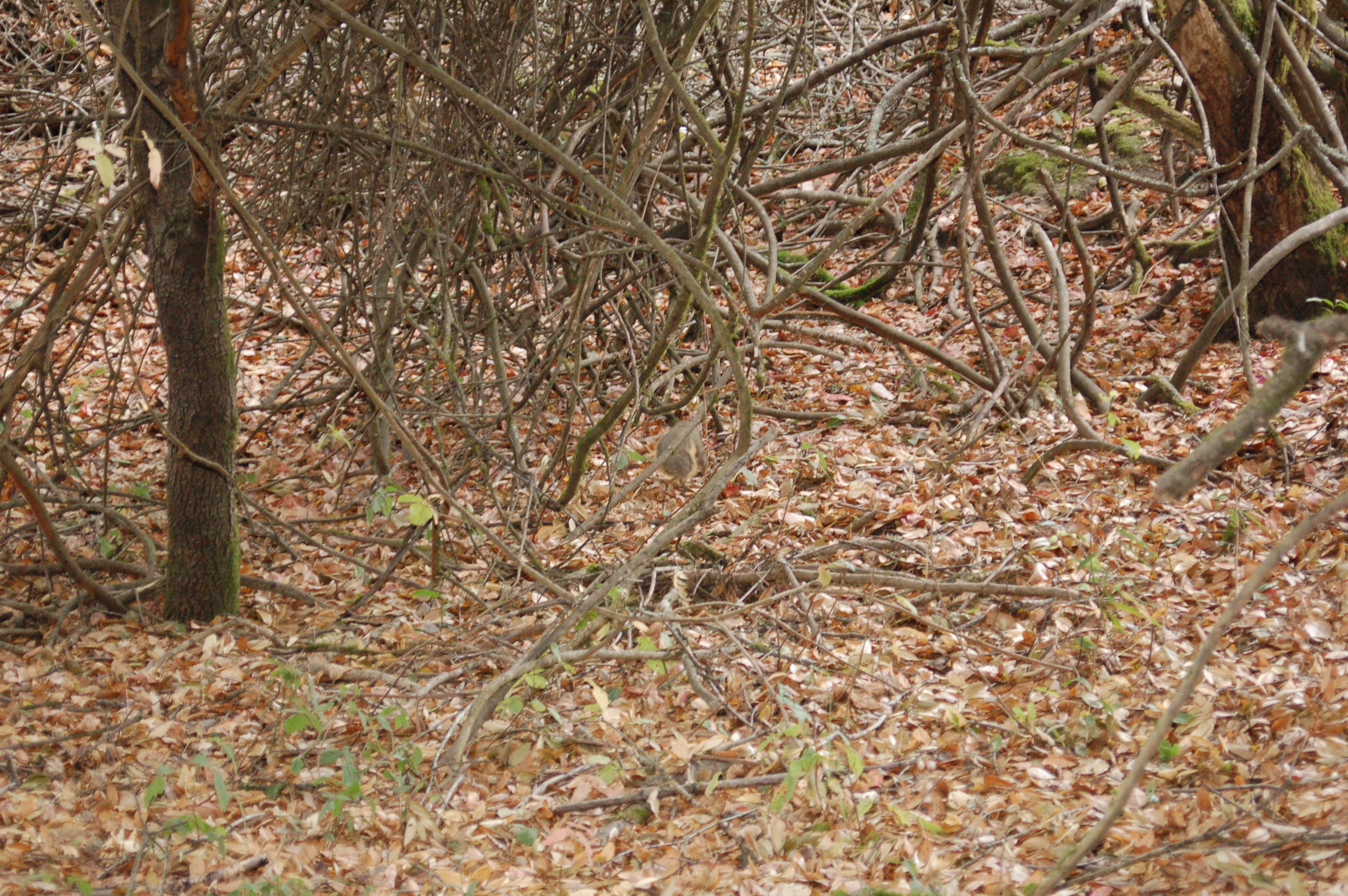
Natural ground cover with Tanoak and Bay leaves with poison oak

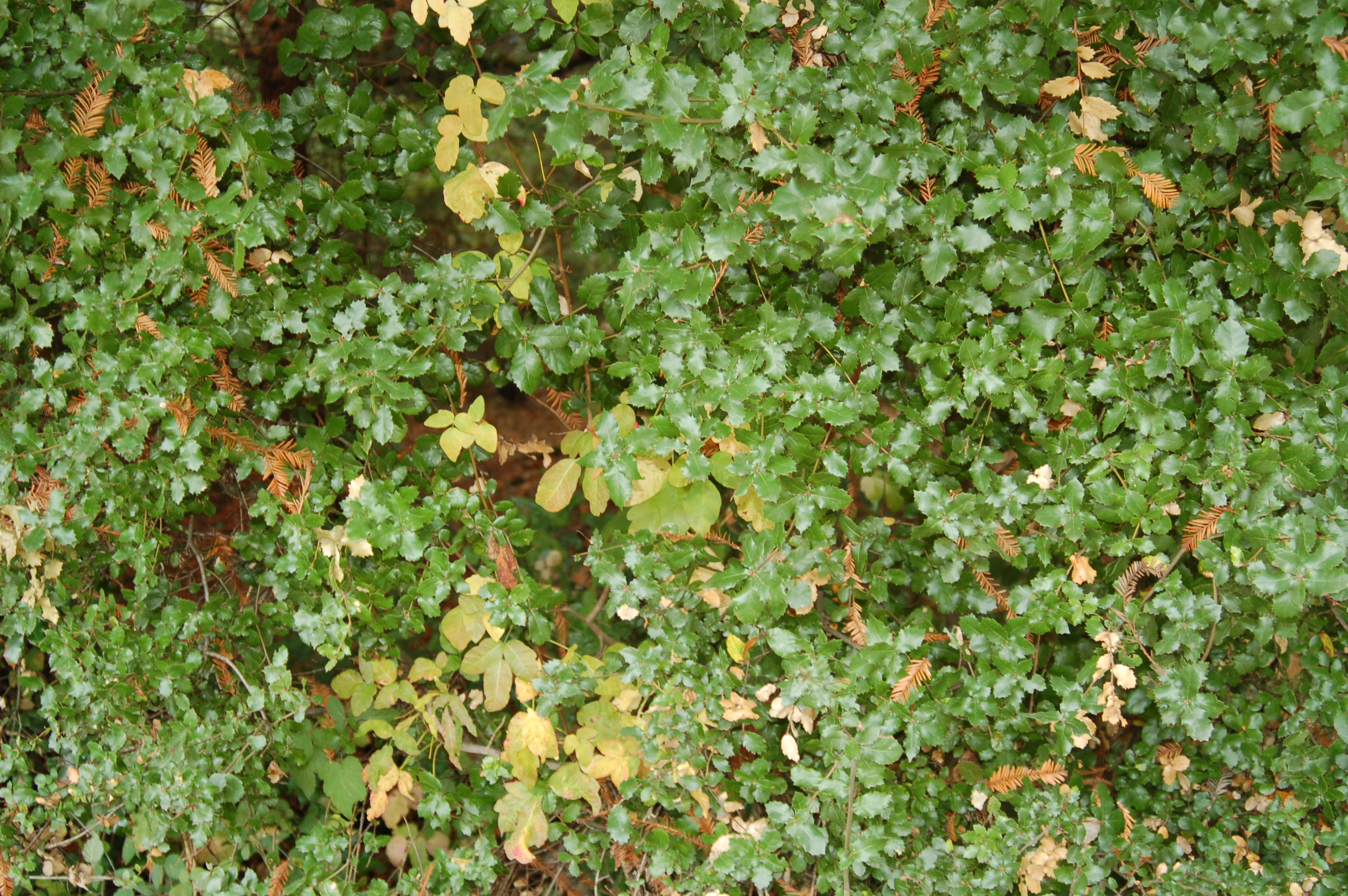
A spread of Holly interspersed with poison oak plants.

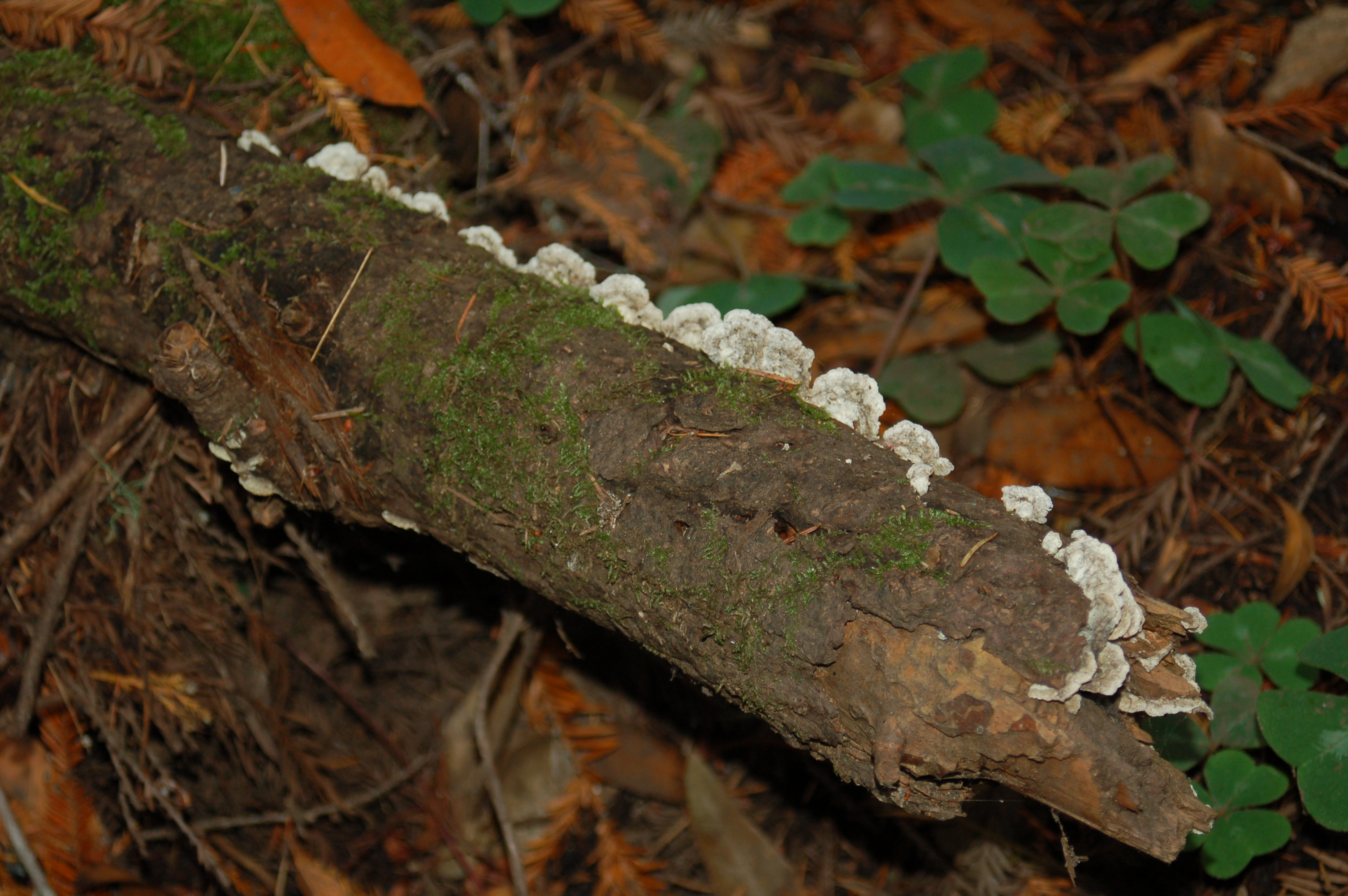
Bracket fungus growing on a decaying Douglas Fir log, with Redwood Sorrel greenery.

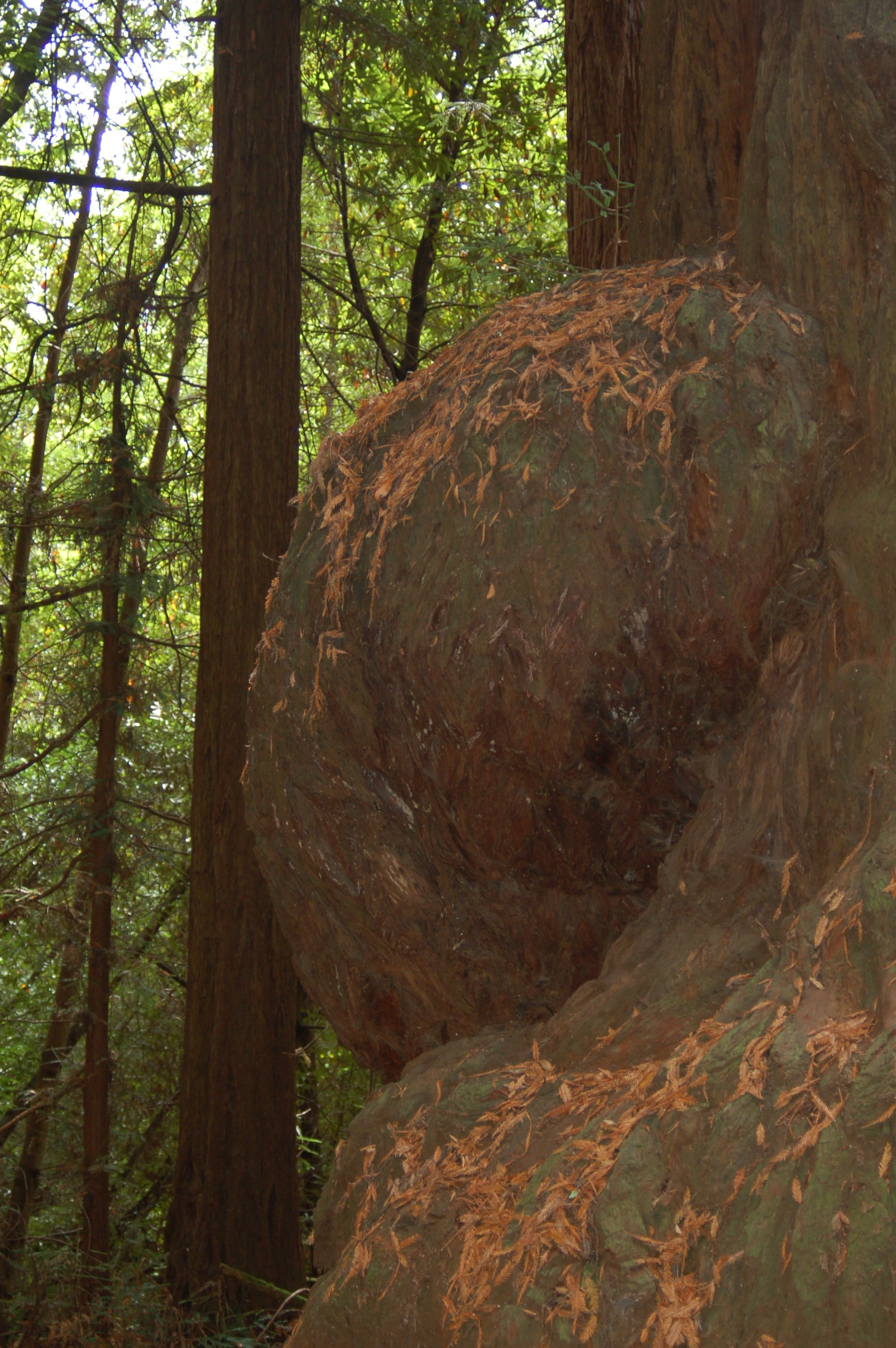
A burl the size of a refrigerator on the trunk of a Coast Redwood tree.

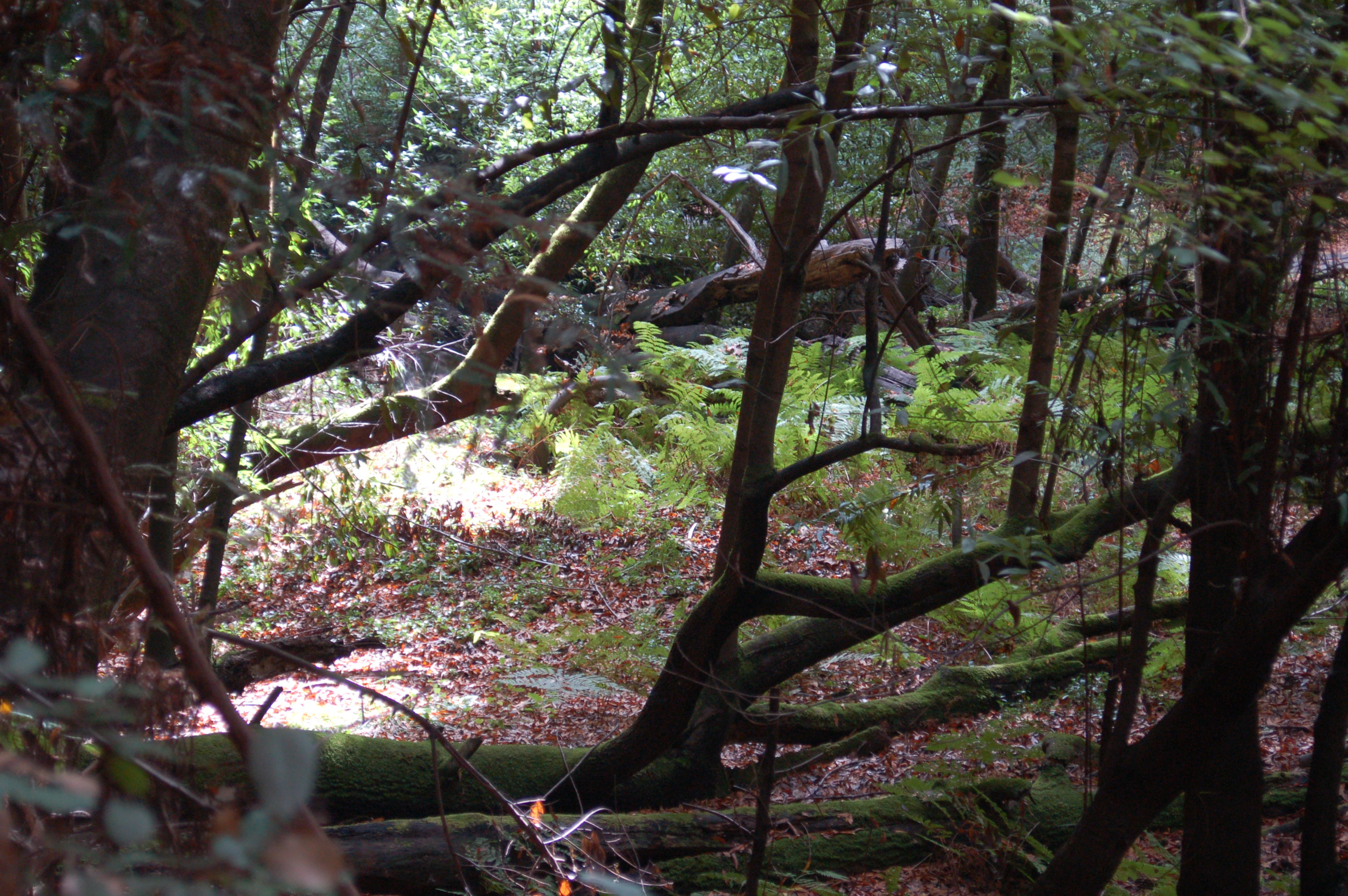
Natural undergrowth with California Bay and Coast Redwood trees.

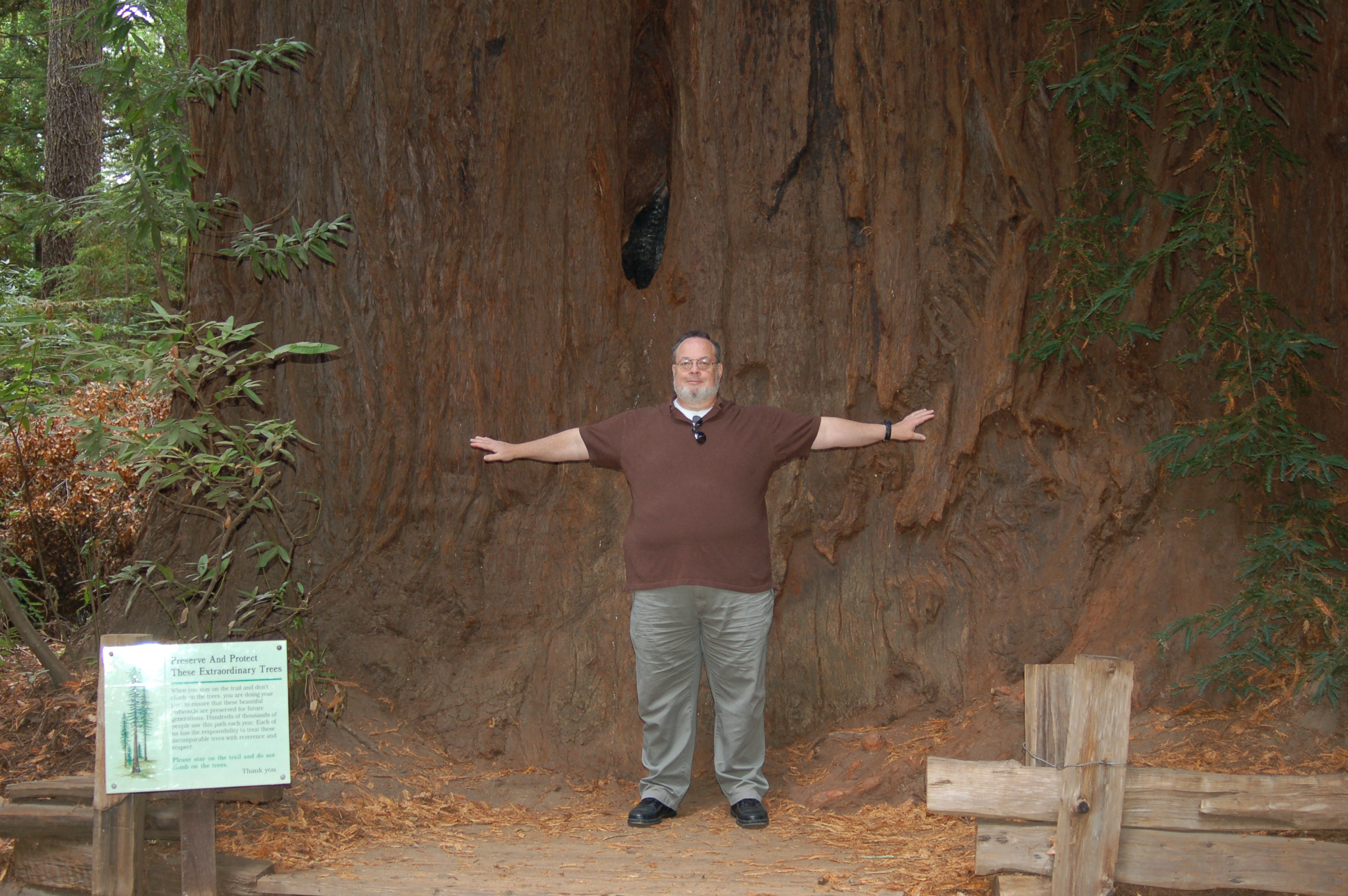
Man standing beside a particularly large Coast Redwood tree.

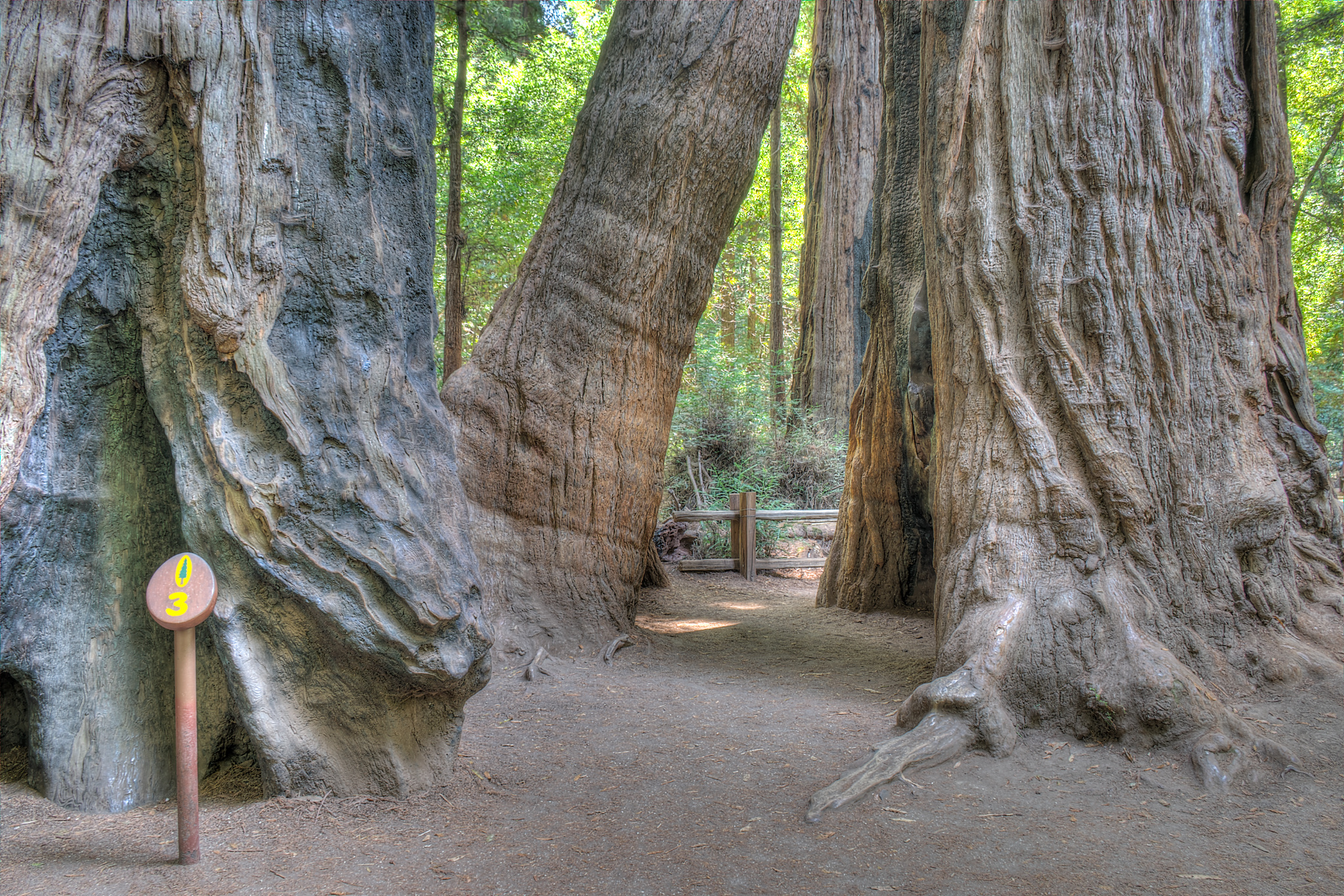
Trail Marker 3: Redwoods and Fire

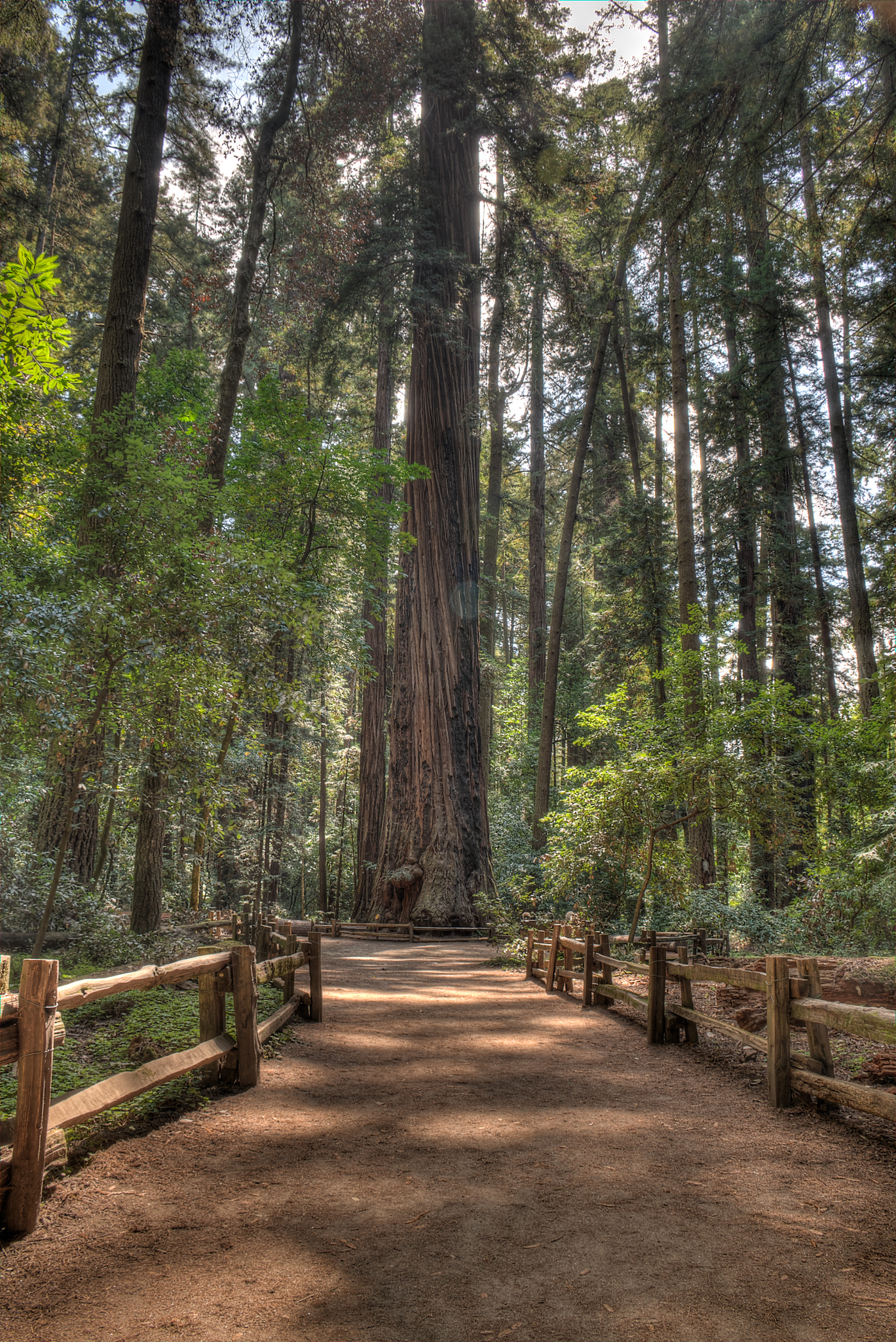
Trail with 280 ft. tree in background
