= Henry Cowell Redwoods State Park =

State park in Santa Cruz County, California, United States

- IUCN category III (natural monument or feature)
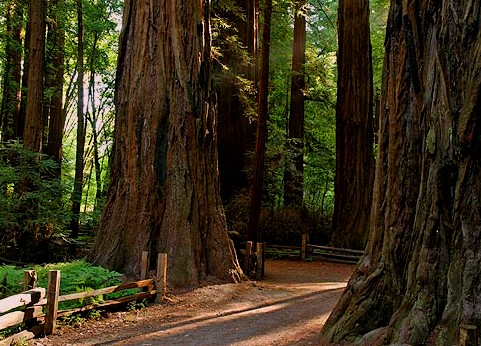
- The Redwood Grove Trail (old-growth loop) in Henry Cowell Redwoods State Park
- Interactive map of Henry Cowell Redwoods State Park
- Nearest town: Felton, California
- Coordinates: 37.0408599°N 122.0649176°W
- Area: 4,623 acres (18.71 km^{2})
- Established: 1953
- Governing body: California Department of Parks and Recreation

Henry Cowell Redwoods State Park is a state park of California, United States, preserving mainly forest and riparian areas in the watershed of the San Lorenzo River, including a grove of old-growth coast redwood. It is located in Santa Cruz County, primarily in the area between the cities of Santa Cruz and Scotts Valley, near the community of Felton and the University of California, Santa Cruz. The park includes a non-contiguous extension in the Fall Creek area north of Felton. The 4,623-acre (1,871 ha) park was established in 1953.

== Geography ==
The main park covers approximately 1,750 acres (7.1 km^{2}), and the separate Fall Creek (not to be confused with the Fall Creek farther north in San Mateo County) unit contains an additional 2,390 acres (9.7 km^{2}). The park lies within the southern end of the Northern California coastal forests ecoregion. In the numerous stream canyons live large populations of coast redwood, coast Douglas fir, California bay laurel, tanbark oak, California hazelnut, large western sycamore, bigleaf maple and many other native species.

Up-slope from the redwood forest are found transitional tree species such as Pacific madrone, along with a stand of Ponderosa pine, rare at such a low elevation. Some of the highest and driest ridge slopes in the park support fairly unusual chaparral communities known as "elfin forests" in addition to the rare and unique Santa Cruz Sandhills community. The old-growth grove of coast redwood, approximately 40 acres (16 ha) in size, is located entirely in the original section of the park, surrounded by many species of fern and plentiful redwood sorrel. Surrounding areas, including the non-contiguous Fall Creek unit, were logged extensively in the mid-to-late 1800s for lumber and as fuel for the many lime kilns that used to operate in the area, such as the ones preserved at nearby Cowell Lime Works. Logging activities mostly ceased by the 1920s, and the second growth redwoods are now up to several feet in diameter.

== Features ==
Both portions of the park have much to offer vacationing families or nature enthusiasts. Hiking, fishing (depending on season), seasonal camping (including RV), birdwatching, and a few horse dog-friendly and mountain biking trails, and shopping at the Mountain Parks Nature Store await visitors to this park. Next door to the main parking lot is the Roaring Camp and Big Trees Narrow Gauge Railroad.

=== Main park ===
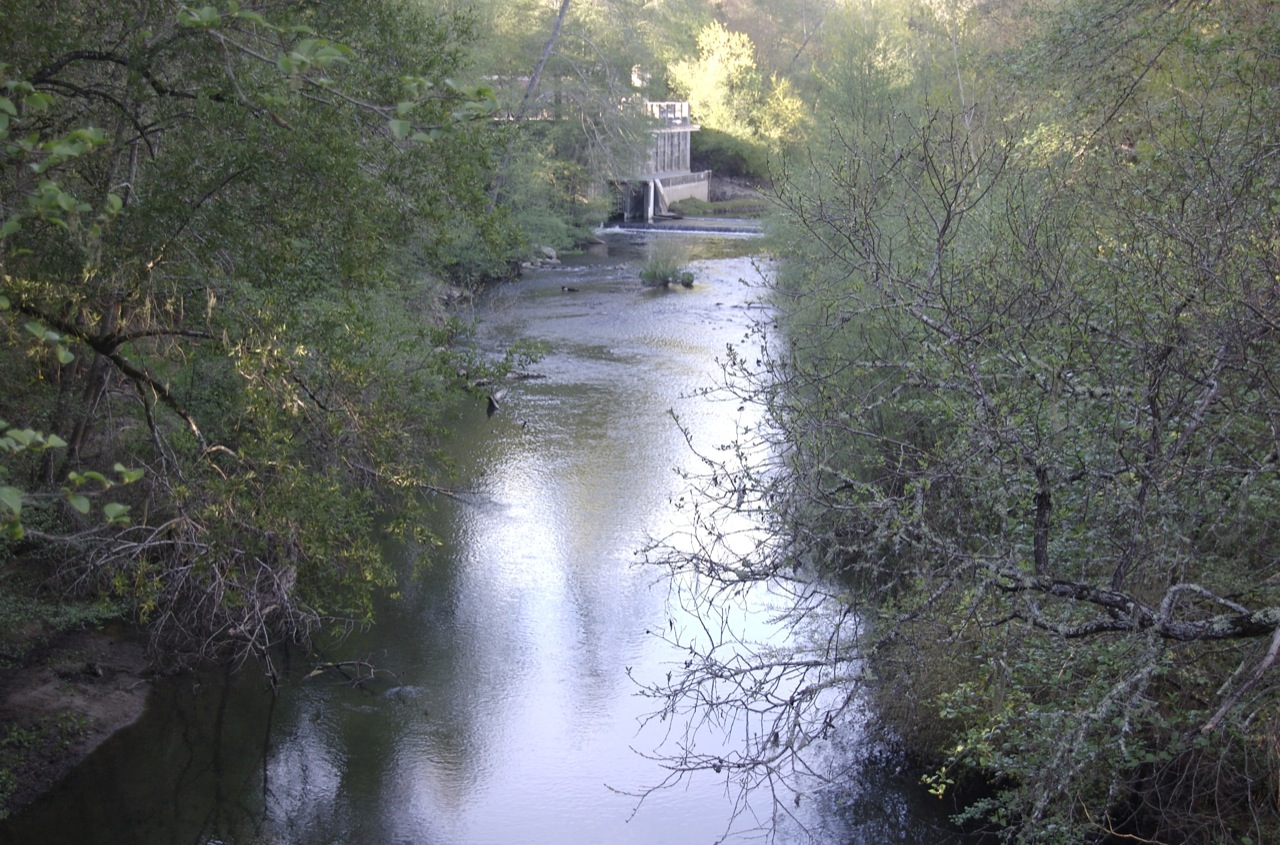
The San Lorenzo River in Henry Cowell Redwoods State Park

There are over 15 miles (24 km) of hiking trails, some of which lead to small, isolated sandy beaches on the San Lorenzo River, and others with overlook views of the Santa Cruz Mountains, with peeks at Monterey Bay.

The park has a more modern visitor center, which is open year-round to the public, and is staffed by California Parks employees and volunteer docents. Additionally, the Mountain Parks Nature Store is open during most park hours, and there is a direct entrance from the park's main parking lot to the grounds of Roaring Camp and Big Trees Railroad.

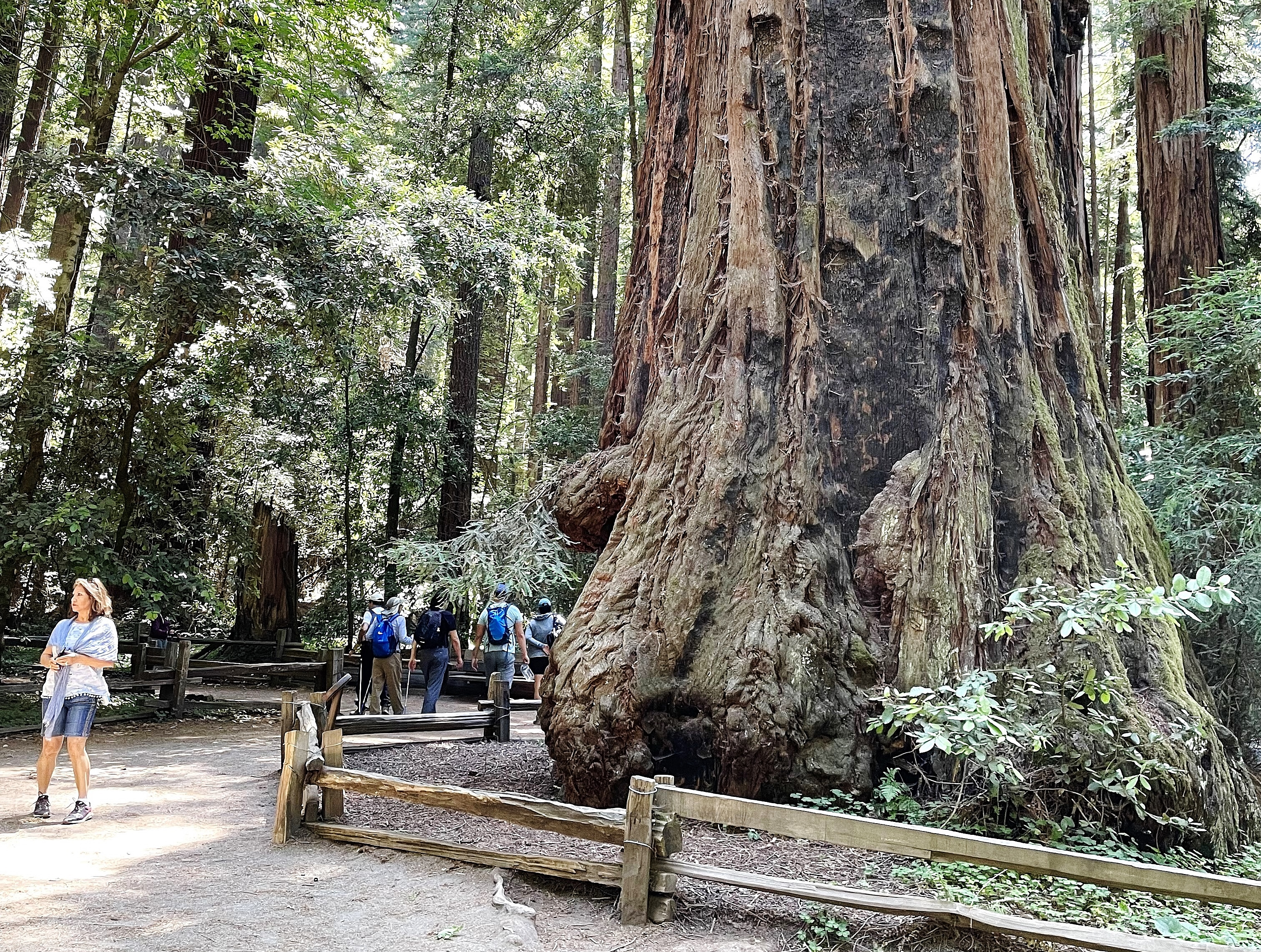
This large coast redwood, which is located on "the loop" at Henry Cowell Redwoods State Park, is known as "The Giant" (June 2022).

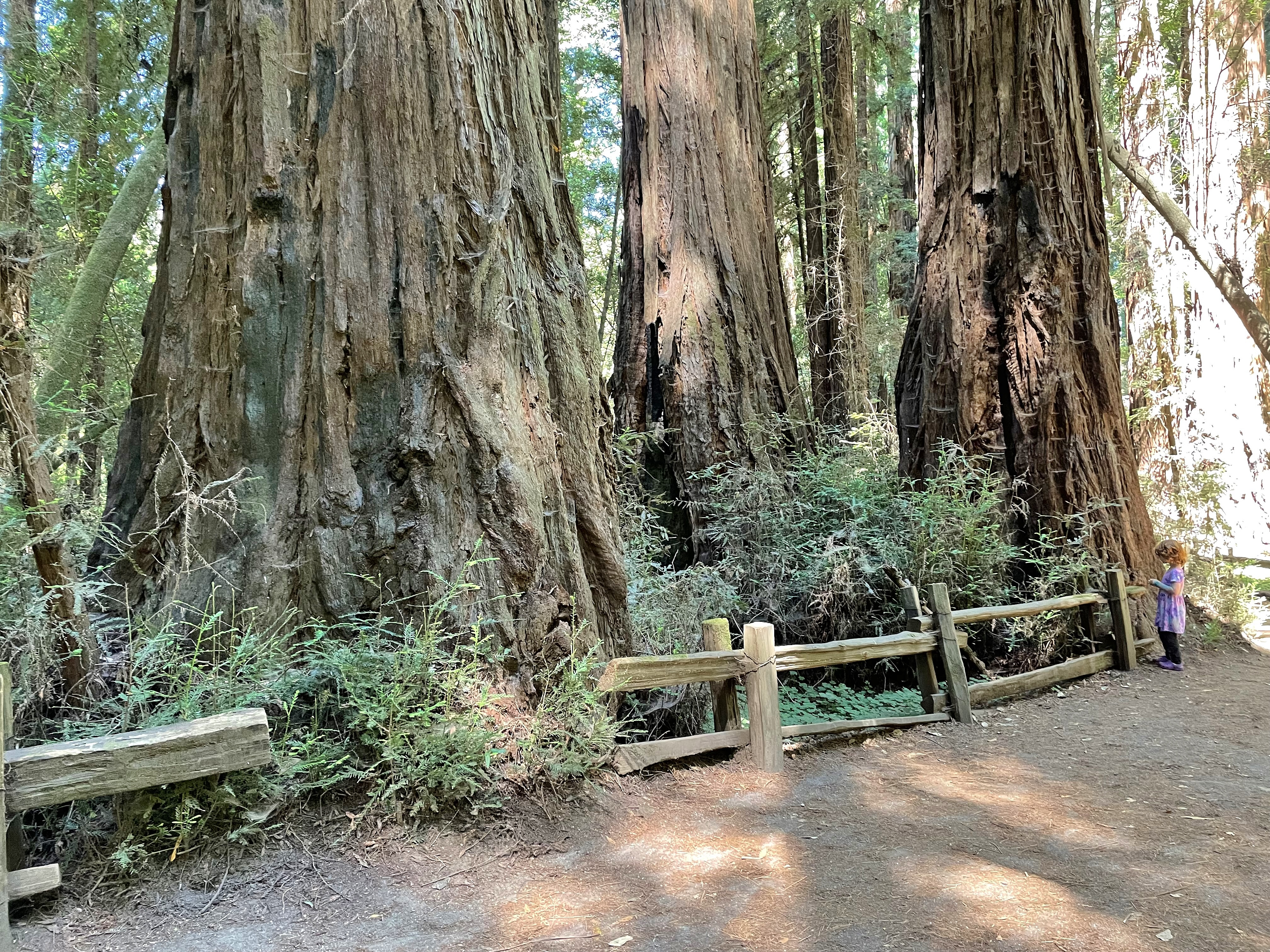
A young visitor to Henry Cowell Redwoods State Park (June 2022)

The Redwood Grove comprises old-growth "virgin" redwoods, the oldest trees of which are approximately 1,400–1,800 years old and grow to approximately 300 feet (91 m) tall and over 16 feet (4.9 m) in diameter. Referred to by locals as "the loop", the grove is primarily a self-guided walk—but on most summer weekends, and many other times year-round, free guided walks led by docents or park employees are available. Featured on the loop are unique old-growth redwoods, including one with albino growth lignotubers and the John C. Fremont tree (a tree hollowed out by fire that was once used as a resort honeymoon room). Next to the park's entrance kiosk, all three known types of redwood trees, the Coast Redwood, the Giant Sequoia, and the Dawn Redwood (the latter two not native to the area; in fact the Dawn Redwood is Chinese in origin) are planted together, providing a unique place to instantly compare and contrast the members of this family of trees.

This park provides a good environment for the study of different habitats. Habitats in this park, often changing back and forth within a few hundred feet of one another, include riparian, sandhill community, mixed evergreen, and redwood forests. Anglers fish for steelhead and salmon during the winter. There is a picnic area overlooking the San Lorenzo River.

Besides roads, the park may also be reached by the Santa Cruz, Big Trees and Pacific Railway. Tent and RV camping with no hook ups are available several miles from the main entrance to the park.

=== Garden of Eden ===
The Garden of Eden is a popular swimming hole in the San Lorenzo River within Henry Cowell Redwoods State Park.

It is accessible via Ox Fire Road off Highway 9 and has a parking area located 0.75 miles south of the park's main entrance. This route requires approximately 1.5 miles of hiking, roundtrip, with an elevation change of 200 feet.

The water depth at the Garden of Eden is insufficient to cushion the many large, sharp rocks on the pool's bottom and, as such, diving is not permitted. Likewise, alcohol, dogs, fires, and glass containers are also prohibited in the area.

=== Fall Creek Unit extension ===
The northern extension of Henry Cowell State Park, called Fall Creek Unit, contains over 20 miles (30 km) of hiking trails, mostly along the creeks that flow year-round and make beautiful mini waterfalls during the rainy season (November–March). There is also an 18-hole Disc Golf course, Black Mouse, run by a local school (Nature Academy). Along Fall Creek are the ruins of a 19th-century lime manufacturing operation, including a quarry and lime kilns built by I.X.L. Lime Company (established in 1874). The lime works were later acquired by industrialist Henry Cowell.

The Fall Creek in Santa Cruz County originates near Empire Grade Road, and flows 4–5 miles South and South-East before it meets San Lorenzo River, east of Highway 9.

Dogs and bicycles are not allowed in the Fall Creek Unit.

== History ==
During the 1830s and 40s, when California was still part of Mexico, large land grants were created, called "ranchos". The lands now included in the State Park were once parts of three different ranchos. Rancho Cañada del Rincon en el Rio San Lorenzo, Rancho Zayante and Rancho Carbonera. By 1865, most of the former rancho lands had been subdivided. Industrialist Henry Cowell purchased 6,500 acres (26 km^{2}) of the former Rancho Cañada del Rincon en el Rio San Lorenzo, including 1,600 acres (6 km^{2}) of forest, in 1865, adding to his quarrying and lime operations in the vicinity. A significant number of buildings in San Francisco were built using the redwood and limestone products from this area. In the 1920s the owners of a large resort adjacent to Henry Cowell's holdings raised support for the County of Santa Cruz to buy and preserve their pristine redwood lands, an action finally approved of, in large part thanks to the work of California Lieutenant Governor, the Hon. William Jeter, in 1930. Eventually philanthropist Samuel Cowell, aged 90, last of the Cowell line, (and endower for Cowell Hall at the University of San Francisco), donated the rest of what became the Park to the State, but only under the condition that Santa Cruz County also give up its nearby portion of the land (Big Trees Park) to the State so that it could all be managed together. Thus, the Henry Cowell Redwoods State Park was officially created on August 15, 1954. The separate Fall Creek unit was added later.

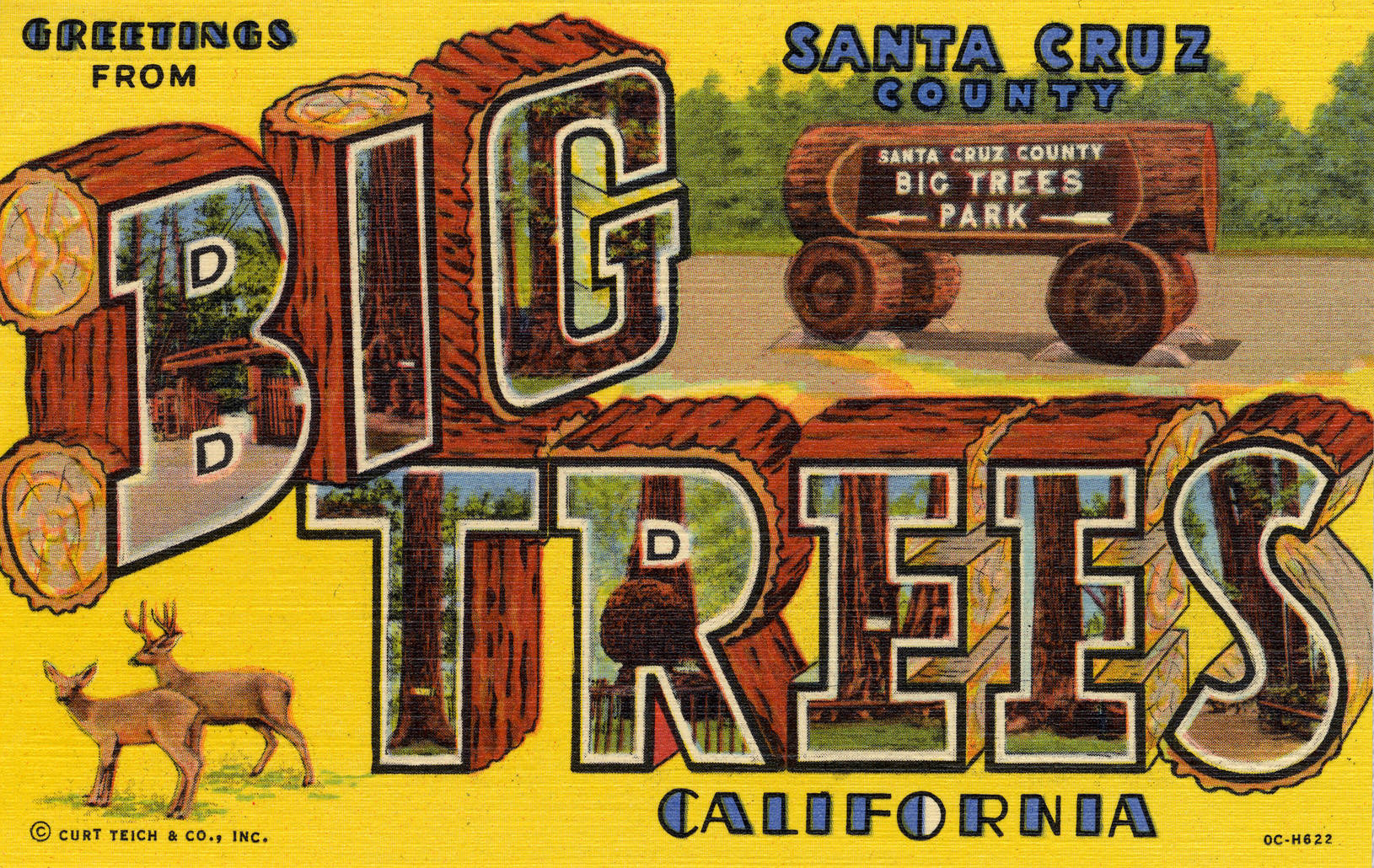
Greetings from Big Trees Park c. 1950

On February 10, 1973 serial killer Herbert Mullin killed 4 teens who were camping at the state park. In 1981 it became a crime scene again when serial killer David Carpenter shot a hiking couple, killing the female hiker.

== See also ==
- List of California state parks
