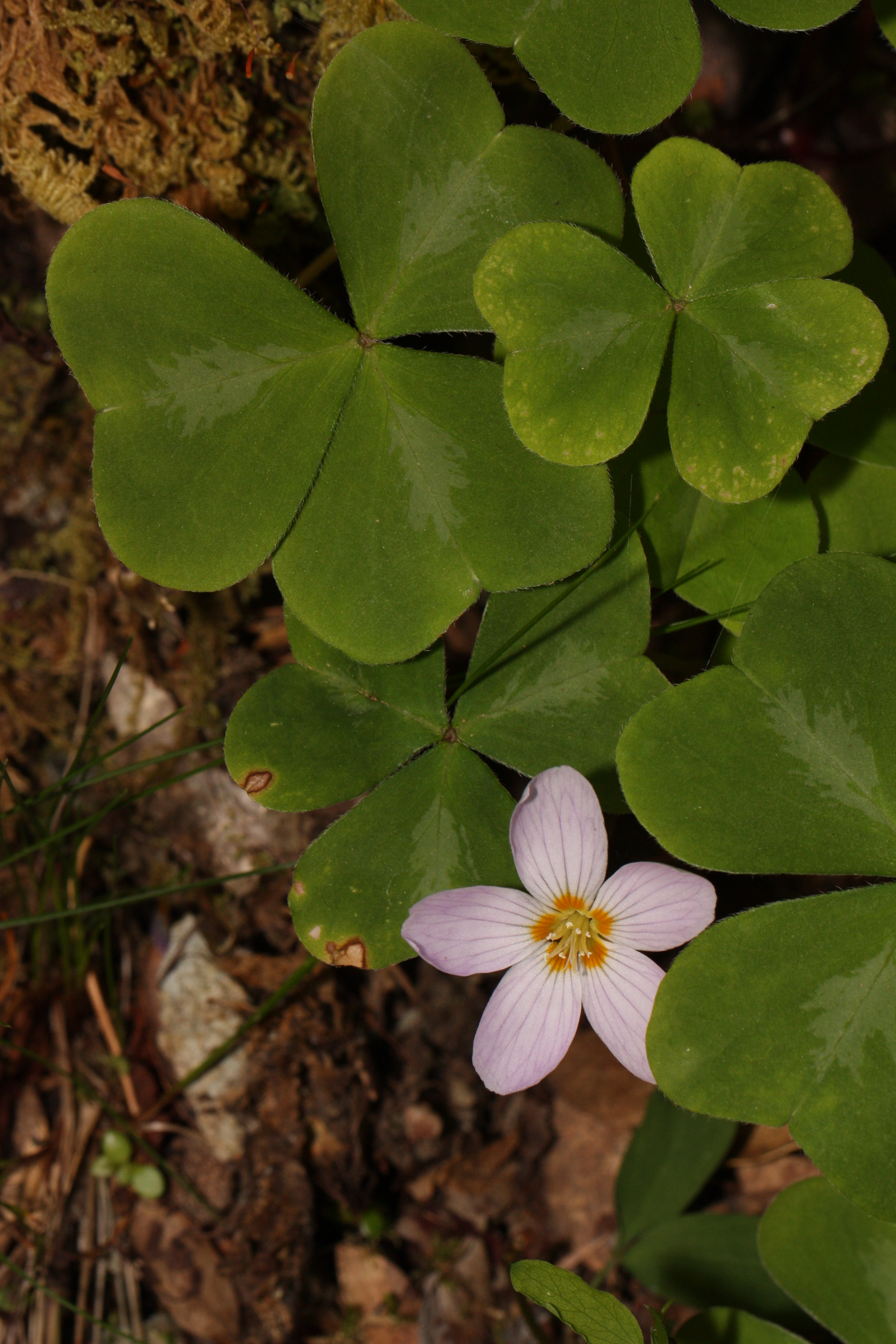

Scientific classification
- Kingdom: Plantae
- Clade: Tracheophytes
- Clade: Angiosperms
- Clade: Eudicots
- Clade: Rosids
- Order: Oxalidales
- Family: Oxalidaceae
- Genus: Oxalis
- Species: O. smalliana

Binomial name
- Oxalis smalliana R.Knuth

Synonyms
- Oxalis oregana var. smalliana (R.Knuth) Jeps. 1925

= Oxalis smalliana =

Shade-loving trifoliate flowering plant

Oxalis smalliana, commonly known as redwood sorrel or California wood sorrel, is a species of the wood sorrel family, Oxalidaceae, in the genus Oxalis native to moist coast redwood forests of western North America from Monterey County, California to Curry County, Oregon.

The name O. smalliana was proposed over a century ago to describe a primarily Californian wood sorrel species distinguishable from the O. oregana type by flower size and color, but recognition of the taxon faded over time. A 2022 study by Brinegar provided substantial genetic, morphological, and phenological support for its reinstatement as a separate species from Oxalis oregana.

== Description ==
Oxalis smalliana is a short, herbaceous perennial with erect flowering stems. The three leaflets are heart-shaped with purplish undersides. Like O. oregana, the leaves fold downwards when direct sunlight strikes them and reopen when shade returns, a movement observable to the eye.

The flowers of O. smalliana are generally larger than those of O. oregana, with the petals measuring at least 15 mm in length. The flowers range in color from white to pink, purple, or blue, in contrast to O. oregana which has only white flowers.

The plant spreads by scaly rhizomes and can form extensive patches in favorable conditions. The seed capsules are egg-shaped and hairy.

== Distribution and habitat ==
Oxalis smalliana has a southern distribution ranging from Monterey County, California to Curry County, Oregon. It grows primarily in the understory of coast redwood forests and other moist, shaded environments. In northwestern California and southwestern Oregon in the Klamath Range, its range overlaps with O. oregana, with both species sometimes found growing together in sympatric populations.

== Genetics ==
Genetic studies have shown that O. smalliana represents a distinct lineage from O. oregana at both nuclear (internal transcribed spacer) and chloroplast (psbJ-petA) loci. A distinctive feature of O. smalliana is its apparent chloroplast heteroplasmy, evidenced by mixed sequence haplotypes, whereas O. oregana shows typical single sequence haplotypes.

Phylogenetic analysis of internal transcribed spacer sequences has shown species-level divergence of O. smalliana relative to O. oregana and other members of Oxalis subsection Oxalis. The divergence of the two species is thought to be related to the Pacific Northwest post-glacial north–south recolonization patterns.

== Ecology ==
In areas where O. smalliana and O. oregana coexist, they show different flowering phenology, with white-flowered O. oregana reaching peak flowering approximately one month later than purple-flowered O. smalliana. This temporal separation in flowering may contribute to reproductive isolation between the two species.

== Uses ==
Like O. oregana, the leaves of O. smalliana are edible but contain oxalic acid, which is mildly toxic in large quantities. They are safe to eat in small amounts for those with no oxalate-related conditions.

Oxalis smalliana can be used as a groundcover in cultivated landscapes under shady and cool conditions.

== Taxonomy ==
Oxalis smalliana was first described by R. Knuth, but was later reduced to a synonym of O. oregana. Jepson recognized it as a variety, O. oregana var. smalliana. Following genetic and morphological studies by Brinegar, it was reinstated as a full species in 2022.

When identifying plants in areas where both species occur, the rule of thumb suggested by the author of the 2022 study is that "anything in or south of Mendocino County is O. smalliana, regardless of flower color. Any white-flowered plant in or north of Humboldt County is O. oregana. Anything with pigmented petals in Humboldt/Del Norte/Curry/Josephine counties is O. smalliana."
