= Cowell Lime Works =

- Cowell Lime Works Historic District
- U.S. National Register of Historic Places
- U.S. Historic district
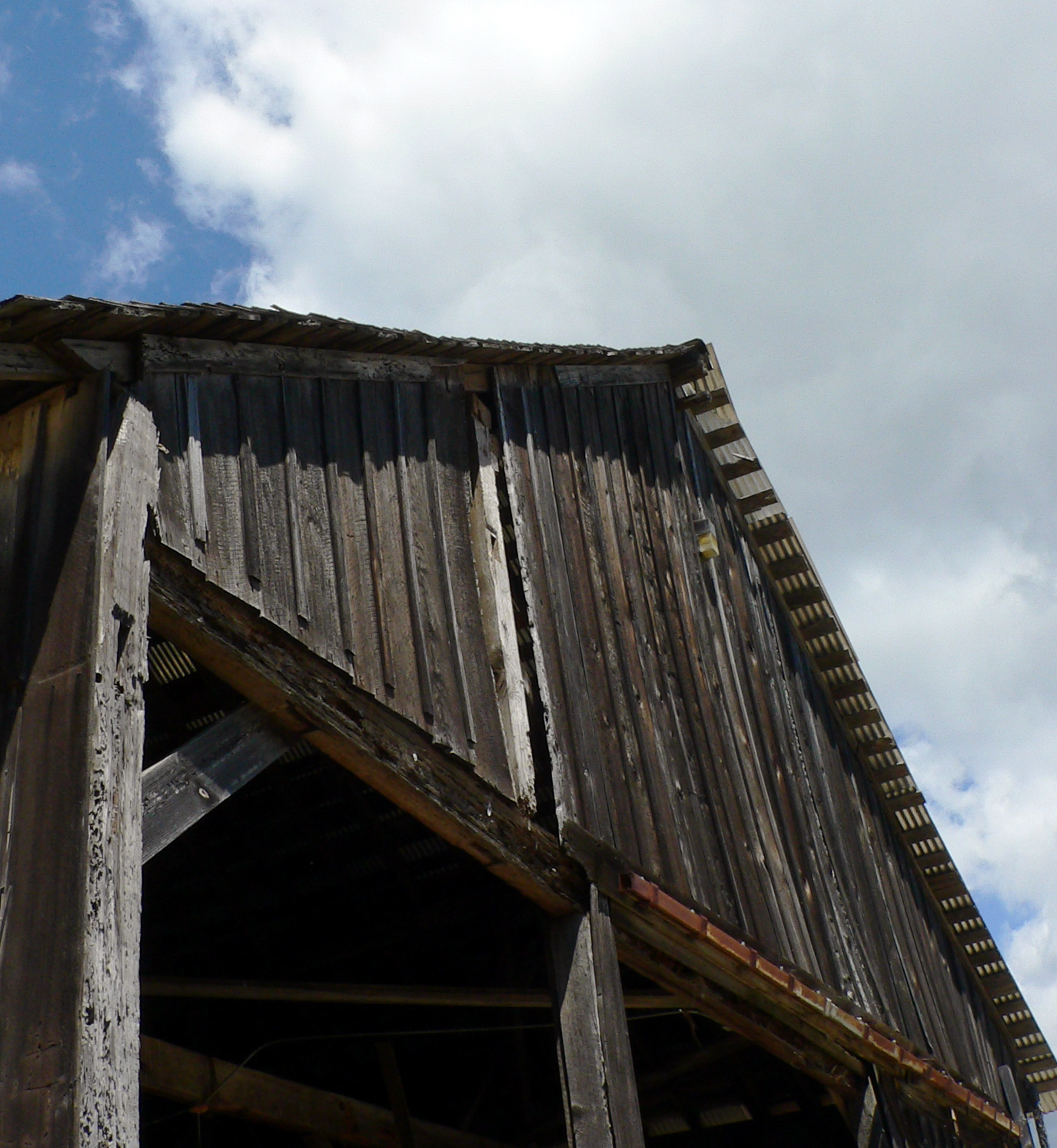

- Location within California Location within the United States
- Location: University of California, Santa Cruz campus; High St. and Glen Coolidge Dr., Santa Cruz, California
- Coordinates: 36°58′41″N 122°3′8″W
- Area: 32 acres (13 ha)
- NRHP reference No.: 07001220
- Added to NRHP: November 21, 2007

The Cowell Lime Works, in Santa Cruz, California, was a manufacturing complex that quarried limestone, produced lime and other limestone products, and manufactured wood barrels for transporting the finished lime. Part of its area is preserved as the Cowell Lime Works Historic District, which was listed on the National Register of Historic Places in 2007. In addition to the four lime kilns, cooperage and other features relating to lime manufacture, the Historic District also includes other structures associated with the Cowell Ranch, including barns, a blacksmith shop, ranch house, cook house and workers' cabins. The 32-acre (130,000 m2) Historic District is located within the University of California, Santa Cruz campus, to either side of the main campus entrance.

The site gets its name from the Cowell family, which owned and operated the lime works, quarries, ranch and large tracts of surrounding timber lands. Industrialist Henry Cowell acquired the ranch and the lime works in the late 19th century. He and his descendants remained owners of the ranch until the death of S. H. (Harry) Cowell, youngest of Henry's five children and last surviving member of the family, in 1955. Cowell's vast estate went to the S. H. Cowell Foundation, still in existence today. The Foundation sold part of the ranch property to the University of California for the creation of the new UC Santa Cruz campus, which opened in 1965. Several of the original ranch buildings have been renovated into university offices. The university's Women's Center and American Indian Resource Center are hosted at the Cardiff House, formerly the residence of ranch manager George H. Cardiff.

The Cowell Lime Works is just one of many former lime-making sites scattered around north-western Santa Cruz County. Other sites featuring old lime kilns and quarries can be seen in the Fall Creek Unit of Henry Cowell Redwoods State Park, Wilder Ranch State Park and Pogonip (a Santa Cruz greenbelt area).

== History ==
The lime works was originally developed, in the early 1850s, by partners Isaac E. Davis and Albion P. Jordan. Two of the thousands drawn to California by the discovery of gold, both arrived in San Francisco in 1849. They met during the next couple of years, and concluded that lime manufacturing offered more opportunities than gold mining. The rapid population growth in northern California at this time greatly increased demand for lime, used to make mortar for the new brick buildings.

The partners came to Santa Cruz around 1853, where they found an abundance of high-quality limestone and proximity to shipping facilities. The firm of Davis and Jordan leased some of the future Cowell ranch property, began quarrying operations, built lime kilns, a cooperage, ranch house, and other structures, and began shipping lime in late 1853. They built a new road (present day Bay Street) between the kilns and the wharf, which descended to Monterey Bay from the bluffs near the famous Santa Cruz surf spot known as Steamer Lane. Their success soon allowed them to buy the lime works land and the wharf they used for shipping. In 1856, they built a new longer wharf and a second ship. About this time, Davis moved to San Francisco, where the company established a sales office and warehouse facilities. Jordan stayed in Santa Cruz to oversee that end of the business.

In the next decade, Jordan's health began to decline, and he sold his half of the company to Henry Cowell in 1865. With the firm renamed Davis and Cowell, Henry Cowell and his family moved to Santa Cruz, where he took over Jordan's former duties. After Davis died in 1888, Cowell acquired full ownership of the company, and it became Henry Cowell and Co. Operations and land acquisitions continued to expand over the next twenty years; encompassing expanded lime production, cattle and milk cows, bituminous rock mining, tan oak bark (used in leather tanning), grain and fruit. In 1898, the company incorporated as the Henry Cowell Lime and Cement Company. The transition to Portland cement, which could be used to manufacture mortar superior to lime-based mortar, began the decline of the lime industry after the start of the 20th century. Henry Cowell's son Harry finally shut down the Bay Street kilns in about 1920.

By the time UC Santa Cruz opened in 1965, many of the mostly wooden lime works structures had been unoccupied for over twenty years and were in poor condition. The ranch buildings were in better shape, having been used into the 1950s. The university began to renovate some of these and adapt them for campus uses. A horse barn became the Barn Theater in 1968; the cookhouse became the admissions office; the blacksmith shop became an art studio, the ranch house (Cardiff House) houses the university's Women's Center, and so on.

== Lime Works restoration ==
The continued deterioration of the unused structures prompted local citizens and the university staff to launch an effort to restore and preserve them. An organization called the Friends of the Cowell Lime Works Historic District was established to help achieve these goals. The Friends, whose members include faculty, staff, students, alumni, and members of the general public, have stabilized the cooperage structure, conducted archaeological studies of the site, and begun restoration of six workers' cabins. A self-guided walking tour brochure is available on their website.

== See also ==
- History of University of California, Santa Cruz
- Limekiln State Park
