= Rancho Cañada del Rincon en el Rio San Lorenzo =

Mexican land grant in California

Coordinates: 37.030°N 122.060°W

Rancho Cañada del Rincon en el Rio San Lorenzo was a 5,827-acre (23.58 km^{2}) Mexican land grant in present-day Santa Cruz County, California given in 1843 by Governor Manuel Micheltorena, and confirmed in 1846 by Governor Pío Pico, to Pedro Sainsevain. The name means "valley on a corner on the San Lorenzo River". The grant was north of present-day Santa Cruz on the San Lorenzo River.

== History ==
Pedro Sainsevain (1818–1904) came to California in 1839 and joined his uncle Jean-Louis Vignes in Los Angeles. In 1843, Sainsevain received a concession for the two square league Rancho Cañada del Rincon en el Rio San Lorenzo grant from Governor Micheltorena, but Sainsevain was not a Mexican citizen, as required by law, until his naturalization on October 7, 1844. The grant was confirmed by Governor Pico in 1846. Sainsevain operated a sawmill on the San Lorenzo River. In 1845, Sainsevain married Paula Suñol (1827-1883), whose father owned Rancho Los Coches near San Jose. In 1848, Sainsevain went to the gold mines on the Tuolumne River.

With the cession of California to the United States following the Mexican-American War, the 1848 Treaty of Guadalupe Hidalgo provided that the land grants would be honored. As required by the Land Act of 1851, a claim for Rancho Cañada del Rincon en el Rio San Lorenzo was filed with the Public Land Commission in 1852. Granted originally in the amount of about 8,800 acres (36 km^{2}) by the Mexican government, the grant was patented at 5,827 acres (23.6 km^{2}) to Pedro Sainsevain in 1858.

In 1859 Sainsevain traded Rancho Cañada del Rincon en el Rio San Lorenzo to the Davis and Jordan Lime Company, for their coastal steamer, the "Santa Cruz". The vessel had proven to be too large for use by the Lime Company. Sansevain tried the steamer on a coastal run but sold it to new owners who took it across the Pacific where it burned on the Yangtse River in 1861. Sainsevain, with his brother, Jean Louis Sainsevain, moved to Los Angeles and bought the El Aliso vineyards from their uncle, Jean-Louis Vignes.

The Davis and Jordan Lime Company, established in the 1850s, by Albion P. Jordan and Isaac E. Davis, two engineers from Massachusetts, established their kilns in Santa Cruz. In 1860, Henry van Valkenburgh purchased a portion of Rancho Cañada del Rincon en el Rio San Lorenzo from Davis and Jordan and established the San Lorenzo Paper Mill. In 1861, the California Powder Works was established to meet a need created by the outbreak of the Civil War, when shipments of gunpowder from the East Coast to California had been discontinued due to the fear that Federal gunpowder would fall into the hands of Confederate raiders. In 1863, the California Powder Works purchased land just to the north of the San Lorenzo Paper Mill and began construction of various mills and the necessary dam, flume and tunnel to transport water from the San Lorenzo River to power the machinery. In 1872, the California Powder Works also acquired the San Lorenzo Paper Mill’s land when that company went out of business.

In 1865 Henry Cowell (1819–1903) bought half ownership of the Davis and Jordan Lime Company from Albion Jordan. When Isaac Davis died in 1888, Cowell purchased the other half. With the excellent grade of limestone and large quantities of available fuel, the kilns were moved from Santa Cruz to Rancho Cañada del Rincon en el Rio San Lorenzo.

A boundary conflict between Rancho Canada del Rincon en el Rio San Lorenzo and the adjoining Rancho Carbonera went to the US Supreme Court in 1894.

== See also ==
- Redwood Grove
- Henry Cowell Redwoods State Park
