= Rancho Carbonera =

19th-century Mexican land grant

Coordinates: 37.000°N 122.030°W

Rancho Carbonera was a 2,225-acre (9.00 km^{2}) Mexican land grant in present-day Santa Cruz County, California given in 1838 by Governor Juan B. Alvarado to William Buckle (Bocle). The grant was north of present-day Santa Cruz between the San Lorenzo River and Carbonera Creek, (a tributary of Branciforte Creek). The southern section of Henry Cowell Redwoods State Park is within the Rancho.

== History ==
The Englishman William Buckle (1803–1859), captain of the whaler "Daniel" in Hawaii, came to California in 1823. He moved with his brother, Samuel Buckle (1795–1872), to Branciforte. He married Maria Antonia Castro. He was naturalized as Jose Guillermo Bocle, but had many aliases - Bocle, Boc, Bocle, Bucle, Thompson, and Mead were a few names he used. William Bocle claimed one-half square league Rancho Carbonero in 1838 and built a sawmill there. William and his brother, Samuel, changed their names to Thompson. He was one of the foreigners arrested in the 1840 Graham affair.

With the cession of California to the United States following the Mexican-American War, the 1848 Treaty of Guadalupe Hidalgo provided that the land grants would be honored. As required by the Land Act of 1851, a claim for Rancho Carbonera was filed with the Public Land Commission in 1852, and the grant was patented to William Buckle in 1873.

A boundary conflict between Rancho Carbonera and the adjoining Rancho Cañada del Rincon en el Rio San Lorenzo went to the US Supreme Court in 1894.
