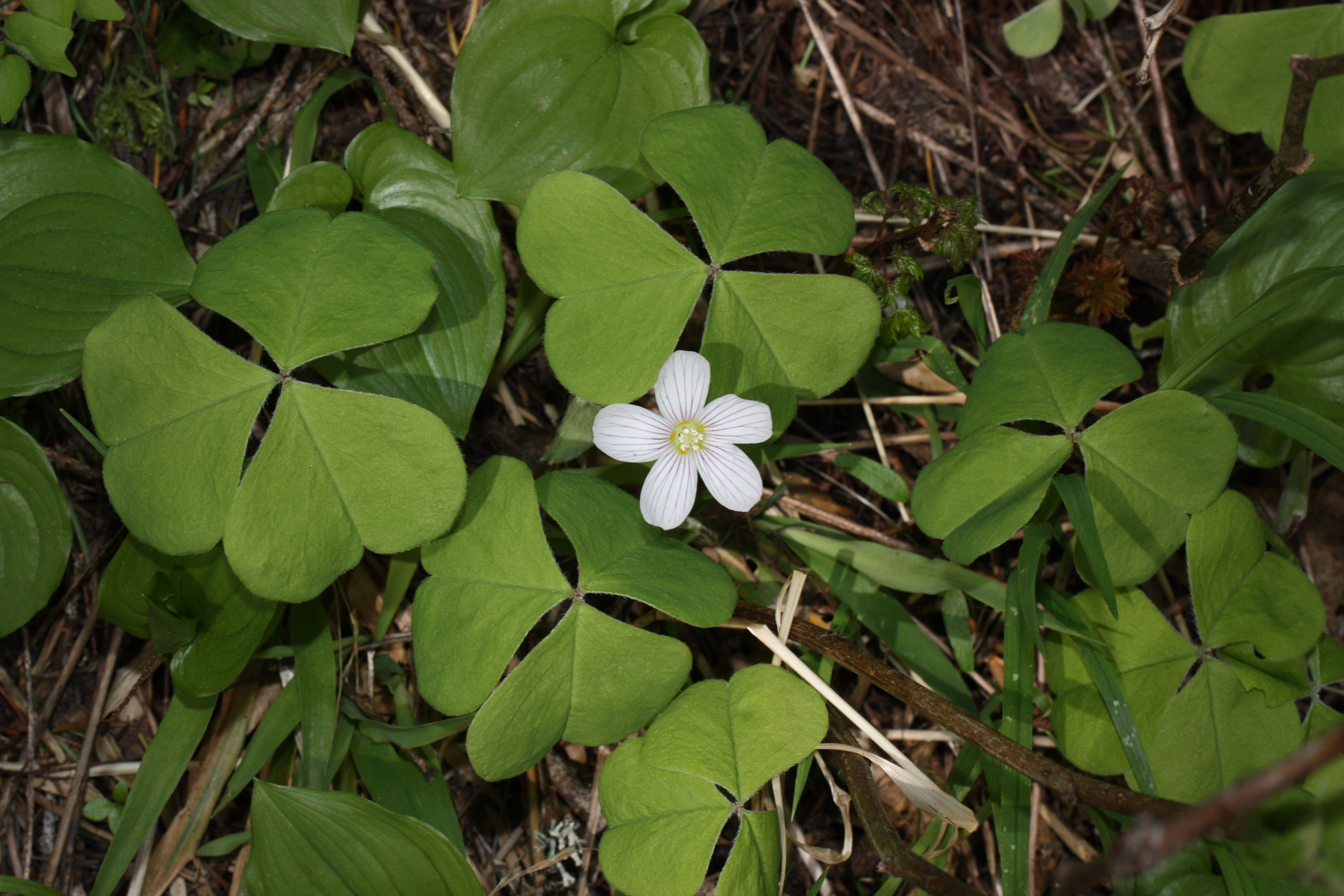
- Redwood sorrel

Scientific classification
- Kingdom: Plantae
- Clade: Tracheophytes
- Clade: Angiosperms
- Clade: Eudicots
- Clade: Rosids
- Order: Oxalidales
- Family: Oxalidaceae
- Genus: Oxalis
- Species: O. oregana

Binomial name
- Oxalis oregana Nutt.

Synonyms
- Acetosella oregana (Nutt.) Kuntze 1891; Oxalis acetosella var. oregana (Nutt.) Trel. 1888; Oxalis acetosella subsp. oregana (Nutt.) D.Löve 1968; Oxys oregana (Nutt.) Greene 1894; Oxalis oregana var. tracyi Jeps. 1925

= Oxalis oregana =

Shade-loving trifoliate flowering plant

Oxalis oregana, known as redwood sorrel or Oregon oxalis, is a species of the wood sorrel family, Oxalidaceae, in the genus Oxalis native to moist Douglas-fir and coast redwood forests of western North America from southwestern British Columbia to Washington, Oregon, and northern California. The species is now recognized as distinct from Oxalis smalliana, with which it was previously conflated.

== Description ==
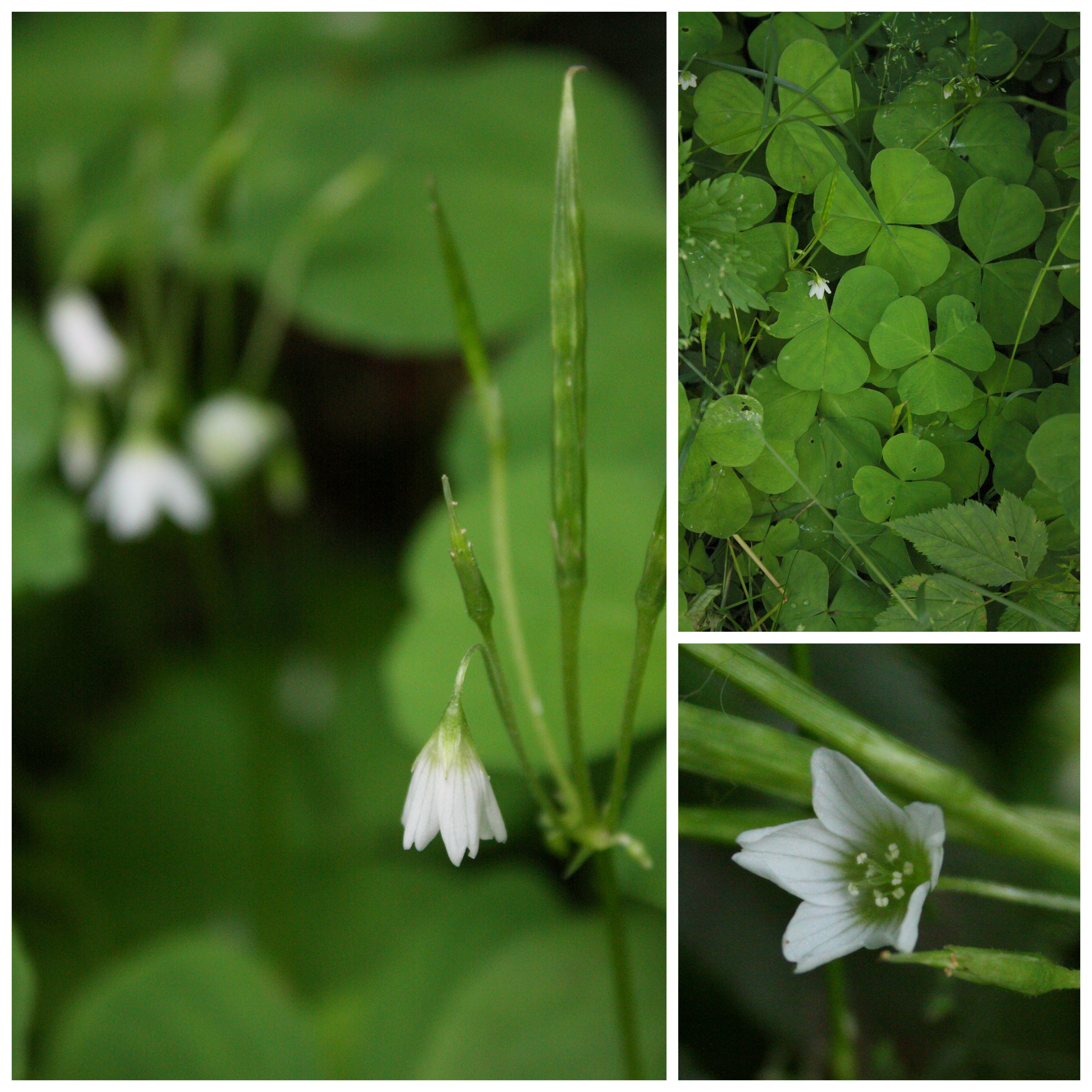
Flowers occur singly; the sepal length is 5–10 mm and that of the petal is 13–20 mm.

Oxalis oregana is a short, herbaceous perennial with erect flowering stems 5–15 cm tall. The three leaflets are heart-shaped, 1–4.5 cm long with purplish undersides, on 5–20 cm stalks. The inflorescence is 2.4–4 cm in diameter, white to pink with five petals and sepals. The hairy five-chambered seed capsules are egg-shaped, 7–9 mm long; seeds are almond-shaped. It spreads by a scaly rhizome varying the size of patches. They can be seen throughout moist forest under-canopies.

The species ranges from southern Humboldt County, California to southwestern British Columbia. Unlike its close relative Oxalis smalliana, O. oregana consistently has white flowers and shows typical single sequence haplotypes in genetic analyses. In areas where both species overlap, O. oregana reaches peak flowering approximately one month later than O. smalliana.

== Rapid light response ==
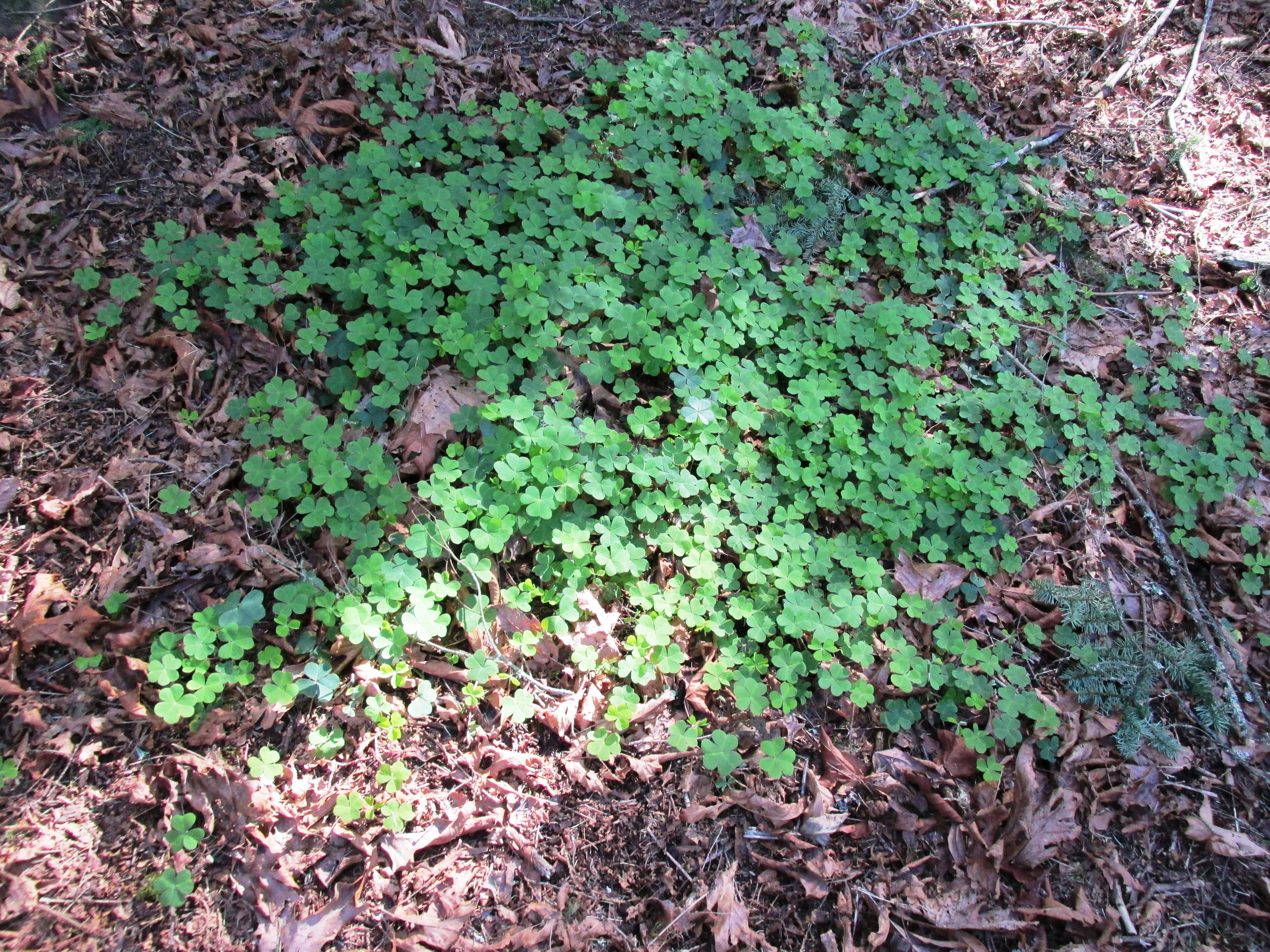
Patch of Oxalis oregana. Size can vary depending on rhizome development.

Oxalis oregana photosynthesizes at relatively low levels of ambient sunlight (1/200th of full sunlight). When direct sunlight strikes the leaves, they fold downwards; when shade returns, the leaves reopen. Taking only a few minutes, this movement is observable to the eye.

== Taxonomy ==
Oxalis oregana has historically been confused with Oxalis smalliana, which was first proposed as a separate species by R. Knuth over a century ago. Genetic studies published in 2022 confirmed that they are indeed separate species, with O. oregana and O. smalliana showing divergence at both nuclear and chloroplast loci. The two species overlap in range in the Klamath Range of northwestern California and southwestern Oregon.

== Leaves as food ==
The leaves of Oxalis oregana are eaten by the Cowlitz, Quileute and Quinault peoples. Like spinach, they contain mildly toxic oxalic acid, which is named after the genus. They are safe to eat in small amounts for those with no oxalate-related conditions.

== See also ==
- Oxalis smalliana - A closely related species previously conflated with O. oregana
