= Coastal Science Campus =

Research campus of the University of California, Santa Cruz

Coordinates: 36.949°N 122.065°W

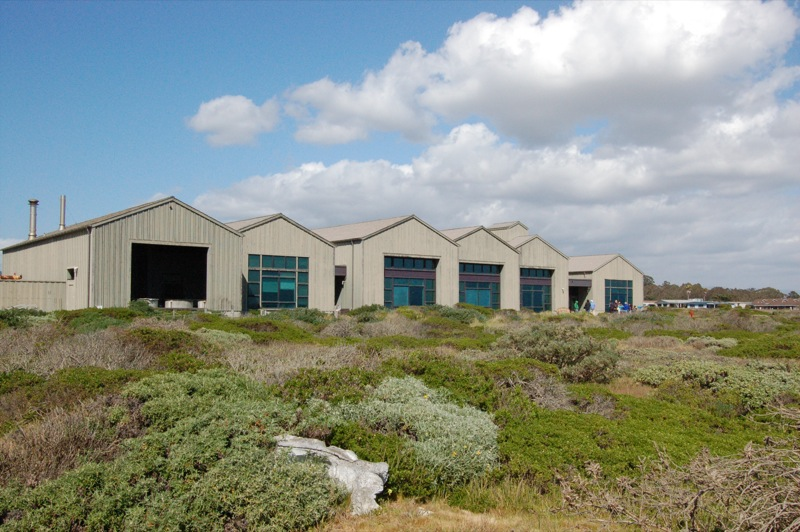
Seymour Marine Discovery Center, overlooking the Monterey Bay

The Coastal Science Campus is administered by the Institute of Marine Sciences at the University of California, Santa Cruz, comprising a number of marine-science-related facilities, not all of which are run by the university.

The physical location of the campus is at the western end of Santa Cruz, California, roughly 10 minutes away from UCSC's main campus, and adjacent to the Younger Lagoon Reserve. Walking trails exist throughout the campus and are used by area residents for walking, biking, and bird watching. Natural Bridges State Beach is nearby.

== History ==
The development of an onshore marine laboratory was a priority for UC Santa Cruz's since its founding in 1965. In 1972, Mrs. Marion Stowell Younger and her late husband, Donald, donated 40 acres of land to be used as a marine laboratory and natural reserve. The 40-acre (160,000 m^{2}) site contains a relatively undisturbed wetlands, the Younger Lagoon Reserve. At 40-50 feet above and adjacent to the lagoon is a flat marine terrace area where the various buildings are sited. The Long Marine Lab portion of the campus opened in late 1978 and formed the main research facilities supporting marine research of Santa Cruz faculty and students. The Marine Wildlife Veterinary Care and Research Center, owned by the California Department of Fish and Wildlife, was opened in 1997. The Seymour Marine Discovery Center, though informally present since the inception of the Long Marine Lab, was opened in its permanent location on March 11, 2000. Groundbreaking for the Coastal Biology building and greenhouses took place in May 2015, with completion and occupancy occurring in September 2017.

== Coastal Science Campus Facilities ==
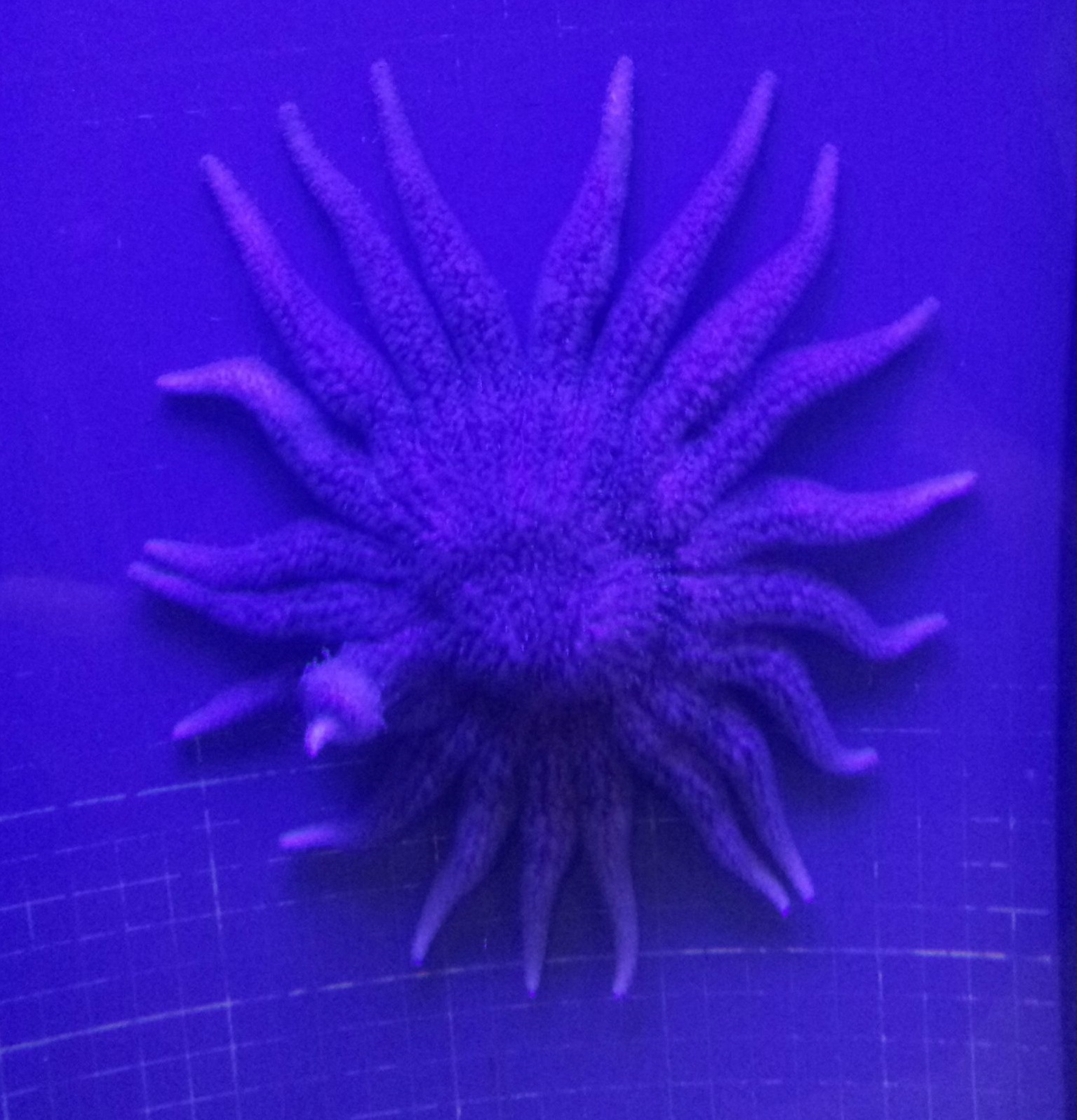
A Sunflower seastar on exhibit at the Discovery Center

1. Joseph M. Long Marine Laboratory. Administered by UCSC, Long Marine Lab focuses primarily on marine sciences. Included in Long Marine Lab are the Ocean Health Building, outdoor seawater pools and pens for holding seals, sea lions, sea otters, and dolphins, seawater laboratories, a scuba-diving facility and boatyard, meteorological station, and offices/dry labs for faculty and students.
2. The Seymour Marine Discovery Center is affiliated with Long Marine Lab, acting as its public outreach and marine education center. The Center contains a small aquarium and touch tank area with various local marine species, which frequently include swell sharks, sea nettles, cabezon, red octopus, and purple urchins.
3. The Coastal Biology Building is managed by UCSC, supporting research and teaching on coastal conservation, ecology, habitat restoration, climate change impacts, and policy. The building houses nearly all of the Ecology and Evolutionary Biology Department of UCSC and its activities (research collaboration, graduate training, undergraduate education and field courses).
4. The Southwest Fisheries Science Center is a federally-owned research institution run by the National Oceanic and Atmospheric Administration. Scientists focus on the study, management, and stock assessment of fisheries in California, with a focus on rockfishes and salmonids. The Santa Cruz lab is one of several campuses under the SWFSC umbrella.
5. The Marine Wildlife Veterinary Care and Research Center is managed by the California Department of Fish and Wildlife Office of Spill Prevention and Response. The center is dedicated to the rescue and rehabilitation of oiled marine wildlife, especially sea otters, and research on marine wildlife health.

== The blue whale skeleton ==
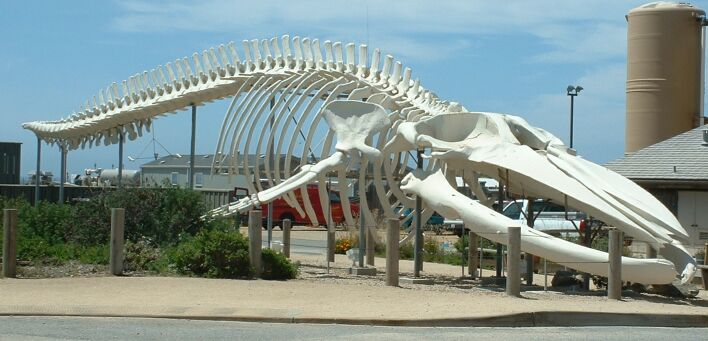
The Blue Whale skeleton outside the Long Marine Laboratory of the University of California, Santa Cruz.

The Blue whale skeleton, "Ms. Blue" is the largest blue whale skeleton displayed in the world and is one of four blue whale skeletons displayed in North America. The whale is 18 ft (5.5 m) tall and 87 ft (27 m) long, and was not fully grown when she washed ashore at Fiddlers Cove near Pescadero on September 6, 1979. Shortly after discovery, biologists and students from UC Santa Cruz began "flensing" (removing flesh and blubber) from the whale, with the whole process taking about a month to complete. Transported by helicopter and truck to the marine lab, the skeleton lay in a grassy field just downwind of lab buildings for over a year before being buried. Burying allowed nature's decomposers to clean away the remaining tissue and oil that saturated the bones.

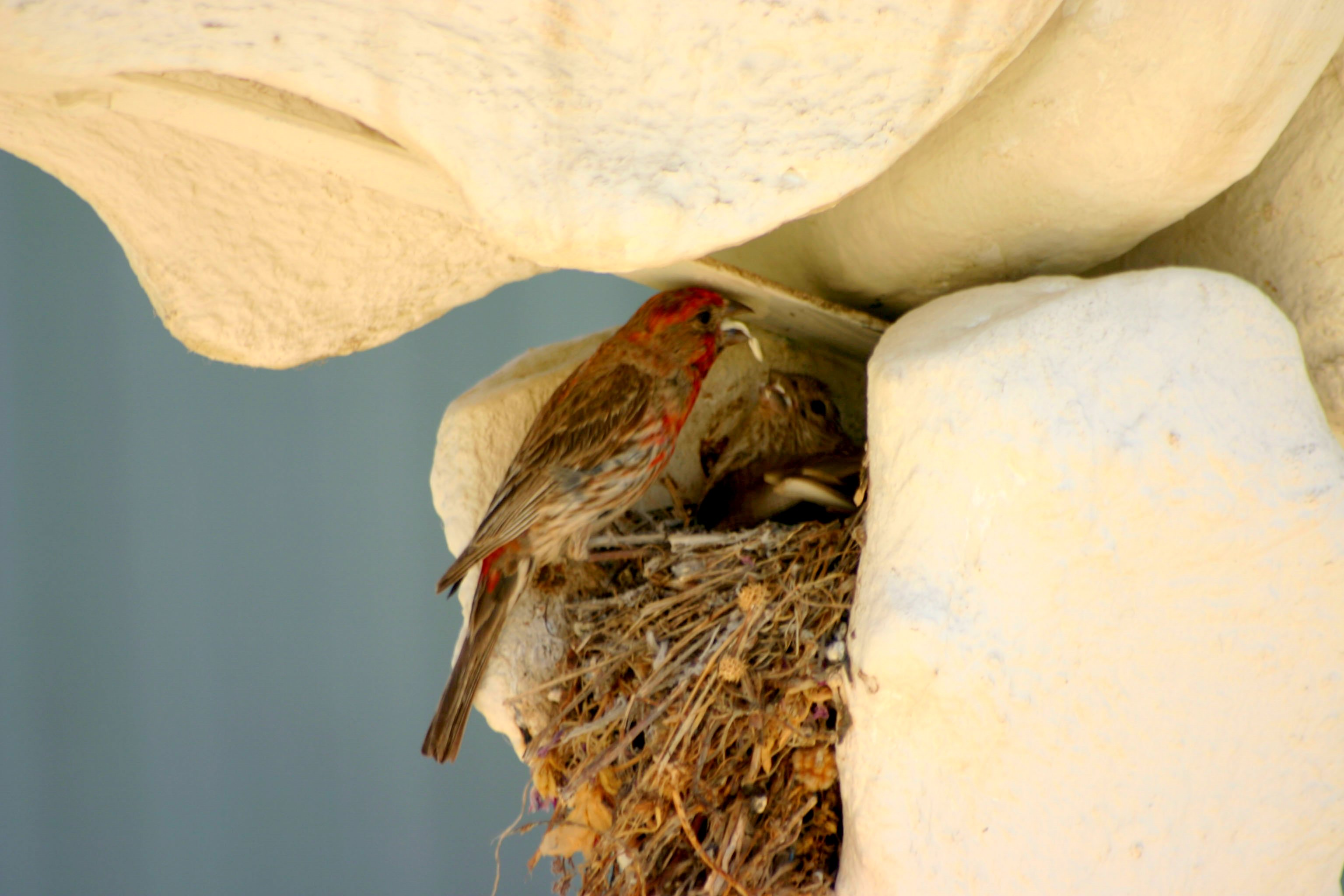
House finch nesting in a whale vertebra.

In the summer of 1985, the bones were unearthed and reconstruction began. Frank Perry, a local geologist and museum specialist, was hired to clean the bones and mount them for display. Working with lab staff and specialists from the Santa Barbara Museum of Natural History and the California Academy of Science, they constructed a steel framework to support the bones and recreate the proper arch of the spine, a job completed in 1986.

In 1999, the skeleton underwent a relocation and refurbishment. During the original recovery process in 1979, some bones were lost to the tides, crushed under the 100-ton weight of the carcass, or stolen from the beach by souvenir hunters. Dr. Dave Casper, UC Santa Cruz veterinarian, re-created the 60 lost bones by creating molds from bones loaned by other institutions, or by using similar structures in the existing skeleton. The flipper bones, originally pinned close to the body, are now deployed away from the ribs in a swimming position.

== Marine Protected Area ==
Natural Bridges State Marine Reserve is a marine protected area off the coast from the Coastal Science Campus. Like an underwater park, the reserve aims to conserve ocean wildlife and marine ecosystems. It is one of a chain of state and federal marine protected areas off the coast of California.

== Desalination plant ==
Following multiple drought-induced water shortages, Soquel Creek Water District agreed to split the bill with the city of Santa Cruz Water Department to build a test desalination plant. Both water districts are dependent on local water sources, and a desalination plant was proposed as a way to help alleviate the threat of another drought. It was reported in 2007 that: "Currently, work is being done to build a $4 million test desalination facility at the city's Long Marine Lab." However, the test facility was never expanded into an operational plant.
