= Rancho Refugio =

Mexican land grant in California

Coordinates: 36.990°N 122.100°W

Rancho Refugio was a 12,147-acre (49.16 km^{2}) Mexican land grant in present-day Santa Cruz County, California given in 1839 by Governor Juan B. Alvarado to María Candida, Jacinta, and María de los Angeles Castro. The grant extended along the Pacific coast from Moore Creek (near the western city limit of Santa Cruz) to Laguna Creek, a border shared with Rancho Arroyo de la Laguna (not far from Davenport).

== History ==
As Mission Santa Cruz developed following its establishment in 1791, the coastal terrace lands to the north as far as Point Año Nuevo became the mission's main livestock grazing lands. Rancho Arroyo del Matadero (stream of the slaughtering ground ranch) was one of four mission cattle ranches strung along the coast. In 1839, the former ranch lands were granted to the three Castro sisters: María Candida, Jacinta, and María de los Angeles Castro. The three were daughters of José Joaquín Castro (1768–1838), deceased grantee of Rancho San Andrés. Candida Castro married José Antonio Bolcoff in 1822.

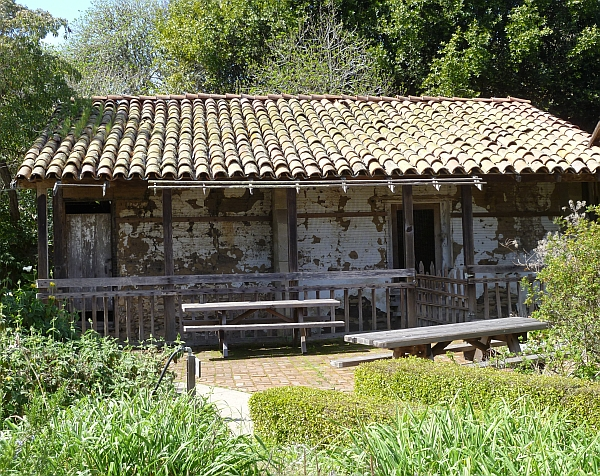
Bolcoff adobe at Wilder Ranch State Park, 2013. jpg

José Antonio Bolcoff (1794–1866) was born Osip Volkov in Petropavlovsk-Kamchatsky, Siberia. Working for a Russian fur trading company, Bolcoff deserted a Russian ship at Monterey in 1815. After arriving in California he quickly assimilated into the Spanish culture, using the Spanish name José Antonio Bolcoff. Bolcoff acted as an interpreter for Governor Pablo Vicente de Solá. In 1822, Bolcoff settled in Branciforte and was alcalde in 1833. In 1833, Bolcoff was granted Rancho San Agustin, which he sold to Joseph Ladd Majors (1806–1868) in 1839. Majors married Bolcoff's sister-in-law, María de los Angeles Castro (1818–1903). Jacinta Castro lived with the Bolcoff family before joining the convent at Monterey. In 1839, Bolcoff replaced Francisco Soto as administrator of Mission Santa Cruz.

Bolcoff's name is not mentioned in the original grant, but he took control of Rancho Refugio in 1841. Bolcoff transferred the title to Rancho Refugio to his two sons, Francisco Bolcoff and Juan Bolcoff.

With the cession of California to the United States following the Mexican-American War, the 1848 Treaty of Guadalupe Hidalgo provided that the land grants would be honored. As required by the Land Act of 1851, a claim for Rancho Refugio was filed with the Public Land Commission in 1852, and the grant was patented to Francisco and Juan Bolcoff in 1860. A claim by Joseph Ladd Majors and his wife, María de los Angeles Castro, for one-third of Rancho Refugio filed with the Land Commission in 1852 was rejected.

In 1846, Moses A. Meder (often spelled Meader in public records) came by ship to San Francisco. Meder moved to Santa Cruz County and made a living building lumber mills and giving small loans on properties. In 1854, Meder foreclosed on Bolcoff's mortgage on an eastern portion of Rancho Refugio. Meder moved his family onto the ranch in 1859, on today's Meder Street. The western section of Meder's ranch, at the edge of the Santa Cruz city limits, is now the Moore Creek Open Space.

Upon Bolcoff's death, his sons sold all their rights to a Charles E. Norton. By that time, perhaps twenty persons held claims for Rancho Refugio. In 1866, Meder took Norton to court to prove his claim on the eastern two-thirds of Rancho Refugio. The case of Meader v. Norton went all the way to the US Supreme Court. In 1870, the Supreme Court ruled that the grant was legally made to all three Castro sisters. The court found that "...the husband of one of the sisters, named Bolcoff, suppressed or destroyed this grant and fabricated a pretended grant to himself of the land, and also certain other papers intended to prove the genuineness of such fabricated grant." The court further found that Meder did legally own a two-thirds interest in Rancho Refugio.

With enough of the legal issues resolved, John T. Fairbanks began buying up claims against the eastern two-thirds of Rancho Refugio in 1870. In 1871, Fairbanks sold his 4,000-acre (16 km^{2}) interest in Rancho Refugio to dairyman partners Levi K. Baldwin and Deloss D. Wilder. In 1885, the Baldwin Wilder partnership was dissolved, and the Wilder family moved onto the rancho. The Wilder family lived on and worked their land until 1969, when it was sold for residential and commercial development. Local opposition to this plan led to its purchase by the state in 1974, and the establishment of Wilder Ranch State Park.
