= Rancho San Vicente (disambiguation) =

Rancho San Vicente may refer to one of several pre-statehood land grants in California, United States:

- Rancho San Vicente, Santa Clara County
- Rancho San Vicente (Escamilla), Santa Cruz County
- Rancho San Vicente (Munrás), Monterey County, California
- Rancho San Vicente y Santa Mónica, Los Angeles County
- Rancho Cañada de San Vicente y Mesa del Padre Barona, San Diego County
