= Wilder Ranch State Park =

State park in Santa Cruz County, California, United States

- IUCN category V (protected landscape/seascape)
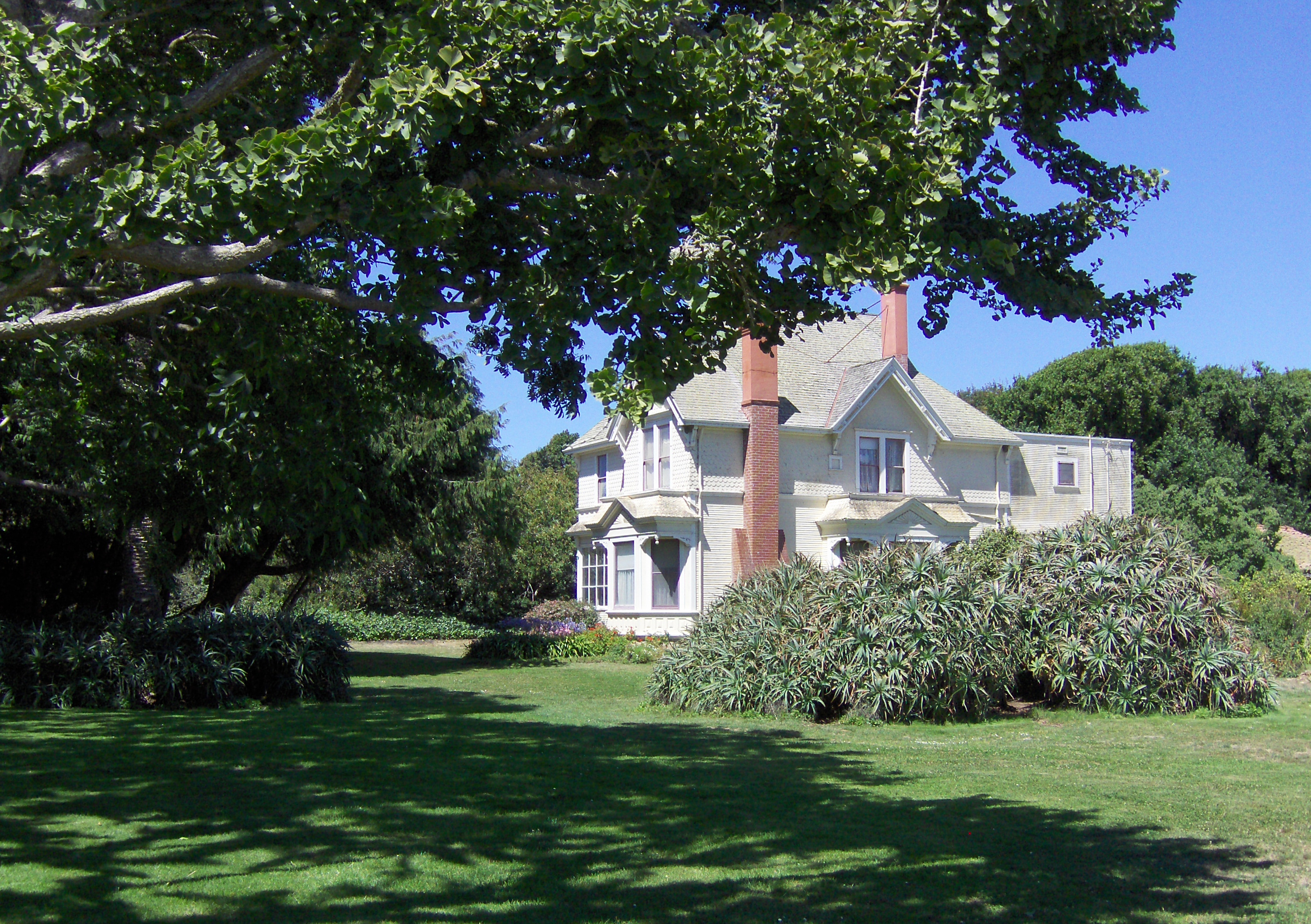
- Restored Wilder Ranch house

- Location within California Location within the United States
- Interactive map of Wilder Ranch State Park
- Location: Santa Cruz County, California, United States
- Nearest city: Santa Cruz, California
- Coordinates: 36°59′N 122°06′W
- Area: 7,000 acres (2,800 ha)
- Governing body: California Department of Parks & Recreation

Wilder Ranch State Park is a California State Park on the Pacific Ocean coast north of Santa Cruz, California. The park was formerly a dairy ranch, and many of the ranch buildings have been restored for use as a museum. There are no campgrounds; a day-use parking lot provides access to the museum. Dogs are prohibited on the trails, but many trails allow bikes and/or horses. The long trails and ocean views make the area a favorite of hikers, equestrians and mountain bikers. Public beaches continue to the north in Coast Dairies State Park.

== History ==
The first European land exploration of Alta California, the Spanish Portolà expedition, followed the coast in this area on its way north, camping at today's Majors Creek (now the northern park boundary) on October 18, 1769. On its way through today's Santa Cruz County, the explorers bestowed a few important names which survive today: Pajaro River, San Lorenzo River and Santa Cruz. On the return journey to San Diego, the party camped at the same spot on November 21. Franciscan missionary Juan Crespi noted in his diary the difficulty of moving along this part of the coast: "The road on this march was very troublesome, on account of the frequent gulches [arroyos] along the way."

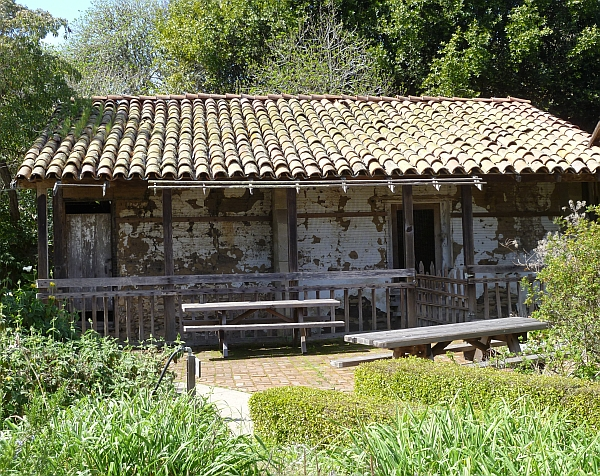
The Bolcoff adobe building at Wilder Ranch State Park

When Mission Santa Cruz was established in 1791, the area became part of the mission pasture lands. Secularization of the missions in 1834 divided the mission lands into large land grants called "ranchos". Wilder Ranch was part of Rancho Refugio, a Mexican land grant of 1839. Historic buildings include part of the adobe rancho house built around that time by rancho grantee Jose Bolcoff.

Dairyman Delos D. Wilder, in partnership with L. K. Baldwin, acquired part of the former rancho in 1871. In 1885, the partners split the holdings into separate ranches. Most of both ranches are now contained within the park. Among the historic ranch buildings, the older farmhouse predate the Wilders. The oldest part of it was built in the 1850s. Wilder's elegant 1897 Victorian home also survives. The Wilder family continued to operate the dairy until 1969, and the state acquired the land in 1974. Since then, the Bolcoff adobe, two Wilder houses and several other ranch structures have been restored for use as a museum.

=== Gray Whale Ranch ===
In 1996 the state acquired the adjacent "Gray Whale Ranch". The 2,305 acres (9.33 km^{2}) parcel contains many long trails, extending from the northern boundary of Wilder Ranch to the University of California, Santa Cruz campus. The addition of "Gray Whale Ranch", plus more recent additions, results in a park totaling 7,000 acres (28 km^{2}) that extends 7.5 mi (12.1 km) up-slope from the coast and creates a swath of publicly owned land from the shore all the way to the town of Felton. The main ranch road (dirt) extends through Wilder Ranch to the Pacific Ocean coast, and in the other direction connects to a fire road on the U.C.S.C. campus.

The former "Gray Whale Ranch" also contains the ruins of a lime manufacturing operation, including a quarry and lime kilns built by early lime manufacturer Samuel Adams in the mid-19th century. The ranch and lime works were later acquired by industrialist Henry Cowell.

The "Gray Whale Ranch" had been zoned only for logging but was considered for further development before the Save the Redwoods League, a private conservation group, bought the land in 1996 for $13.4 million and transferred it to the State Parks Department. The California Coastal Conservancy and the state California Wildlife Conservation Board (California Department of Fish and Wildlife), each contributed to help State Parks acquire the property for just over $1 million.

==== Caving ====
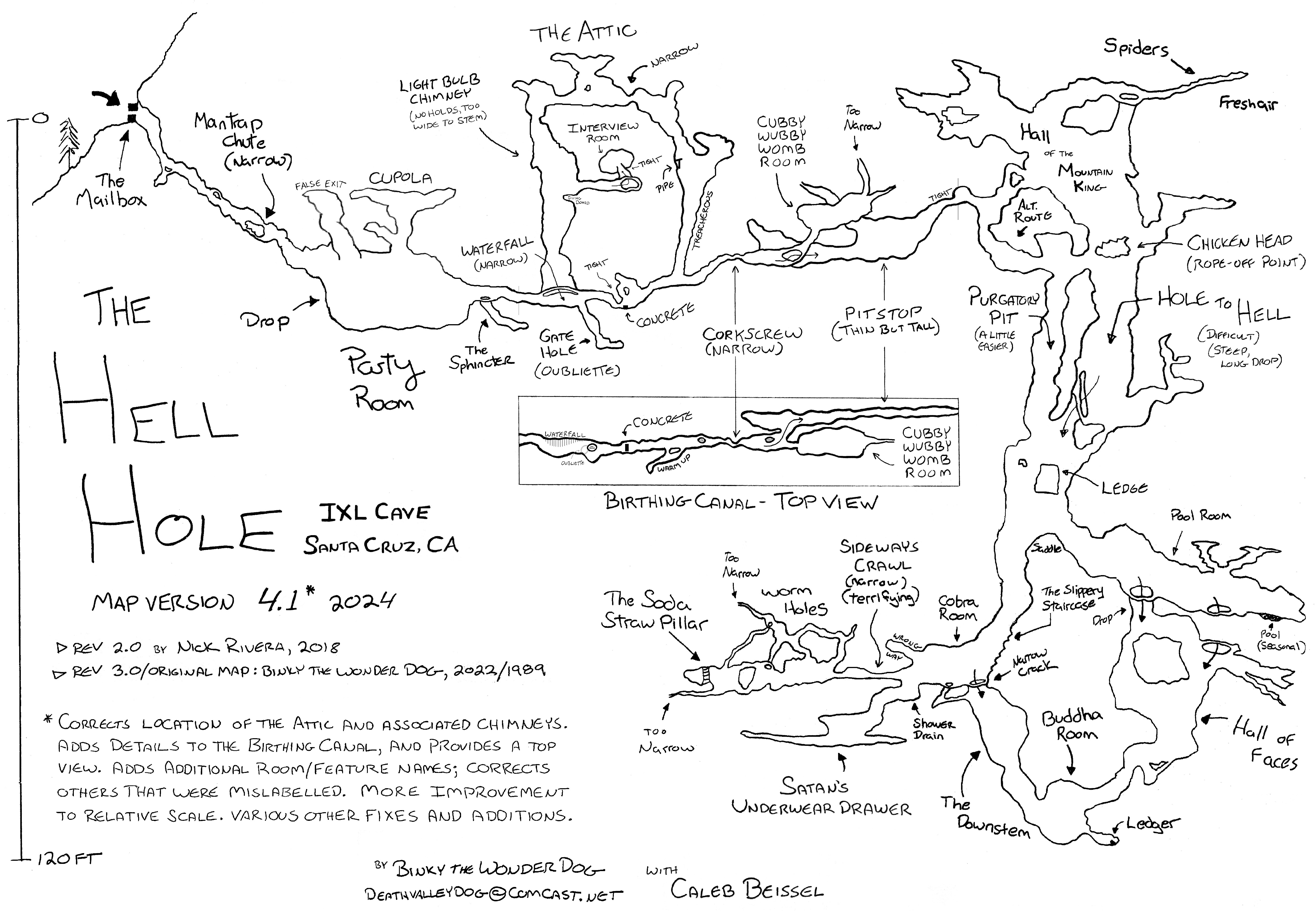
A map of the Hell Hole/IXL cave.

Caving is one popular activity at Gray Whale Ranch, although most cavers try to prevent the location of the caves from becoming widely known.

One such example is the "Hell Hole" (originally known as the "Tom Sawyer Cave" when it was first reported in 1954; subsequently known by the names of "IXL" and "Hell Hole" by 1990) a limestone cave, popular with local spelunkers.

This cave was known about in the local spelunking community since at least 1953, but gained some further local notoriety after two spelunkers needed rescuing from the cave in January 1990; prompting security guards to limit access to the Hell Hole along with other caves on Grey Whale Ranch. Around this time, visiting the cave was considered to be a rite of passage for students at the nearby UC Santa Cruz, however, many visitors did damage the cave and leave litter behind. In spite of the best efforts from early explorers to keep the location of the cave a secret, the location of the Hell Hole is easily found online, which has made it even easier for visitors to visit the cave; however, inexperienced cavers are actively discouraged from visiting the Hell Hole, due to the many risks involved.

Entering the cave involves descending a rather narrow tunnel, before a ~15 foot drop leading to a reasonably large room, known as the "Party Room". The main destination for contemporary explorers to the Hell Hole is the "Hall of Faces", a clay room where people leave sculptures and sign a book at the very bottom. Getting to the Hall of Faces is no easy task, and requires descending the 90 foot (27 m) vertical called "Purgatory Pit", which itself accessed via some further narrow tunnels from the Party Room. Barricades are periodically placed on the cave entrance to prevent entry, but these barriers are typically removed fairly quickly.

== Marine protected area ==
Natural Bridges State Marine Reserve is a marine protected area along the coast of Wilder Ranch State Park and part of the adjacent Natural Bridges State Beach. The long, narrow Reserve area is bounded by the mean high tide line and a distance of 200 feet seaward of mean lower low water. This protected area helps conserve ocean tidal-zone wildlife and marine ecosystems.

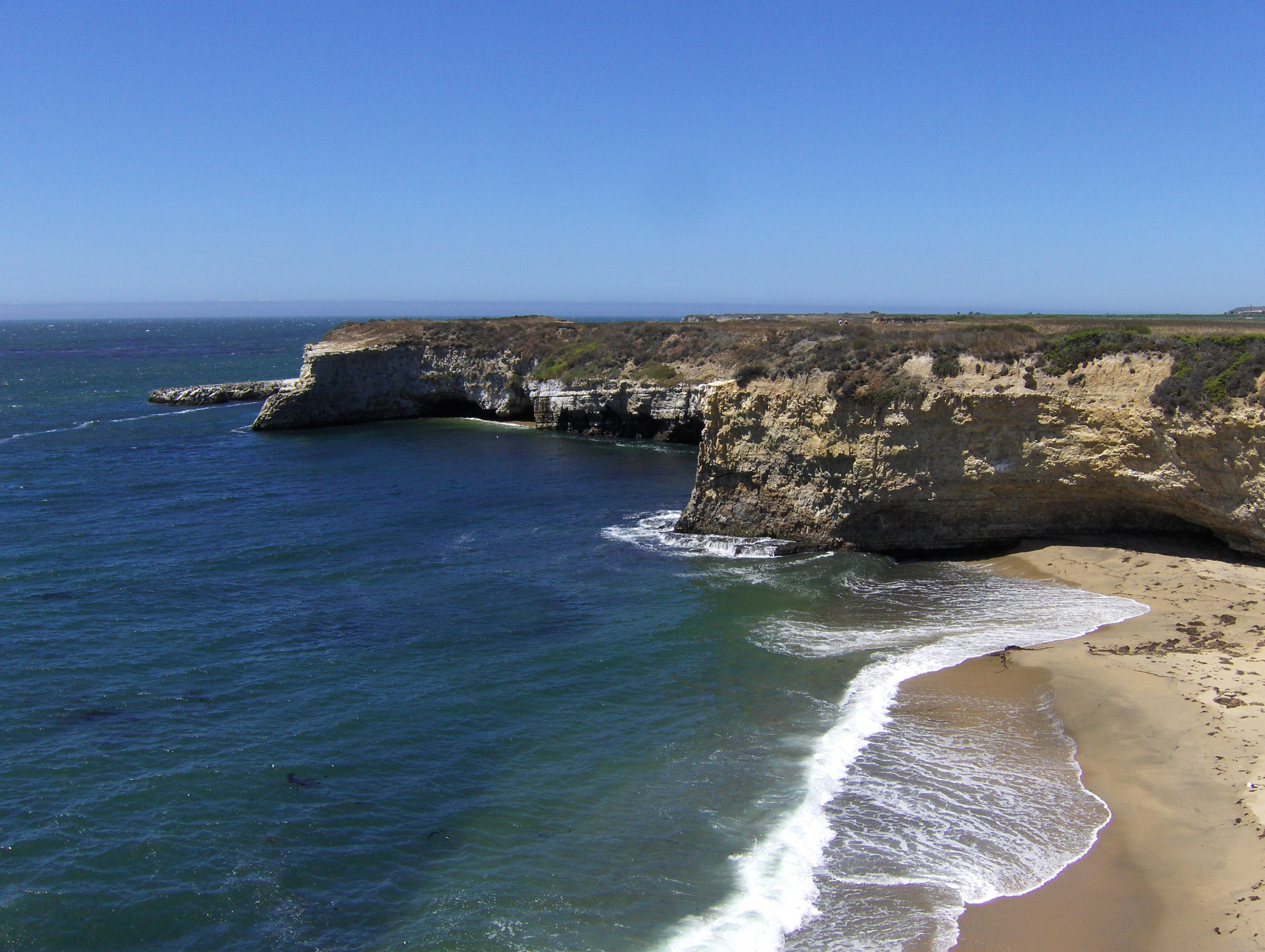
Seaside cliffs and beach at Wilder Ranch
