= Rancho Arroyo de la Laguna =

Land grant in California

Coordinates: 37.010°N 122.160°W

Rancho Arroyo de la Laguna was a 4,418-acre (17.88 km^{2}) Mexican land grant in present-day Santa Cruz County, California given in 1840 by Governor Juan B. Alvarado to Gil Sanchez. The grant extended along the Pacific coast south-east from Rancho San Vicente and San Vicente Creek (which runs through present day Davenport) to Laguna Creek and Rancho Refugio.

== History ==
The one square league grant was made in 1840 by Governor Alvarado to Gil Sanchez, a tithe collector at Branciforte. In 1842, Gil Sanchez killed Fulgencio Robles, the terror of all the region, while he was disturbing a party of gamblers. After a hearing, held in Monterey, Gil Sanchez was ordered to be "exiled 20 leagues from Branciforte and pay 200 Pesos to the children of Fulgencio Robles" in the death of their father.

The grant was acquired by James and Squire Williams. James Williams (1814–1858) and his three brothers (John (1816–), Isaac (1823–1856), and Squire (1825–)), came to California with the Chiles-Walker party in 1843. The Williams brothers settled at Sutter's Fort where James worked as a blacksmith and John as a tanner. In 1845, James was married to Mary Patterson (1828–1851) who had come to California with the Stephens-Townsend-Murphy Party of 1844. The Williams brothers and the Patterson family settled in the Santa Cruz area.

With the cession of California to the United States following the Mexican-American War, the 1848 Treaty of Guadalupe Hidalgo provided that the land grants would be honored. As required by the Land Act of 1851, a claim for Rancho Arroyo de la Laguna was filed with the Public Land Commission in 1852. The Williams unsuccessfully tried have the grant defined by boundaries (San Vicente Creek to Laguna Creek) rather than by size (one square league), and the grant was patented to James and Squire Williams in 1882.

Most of this property was eventually acquired by Jeremiah Respini and became part of the Coast Dairies Property.
