= Younger Lagoon Reserve =

Nature reserve in Santa Cruz, California

- IUCN category V (protected landscape/seascape)
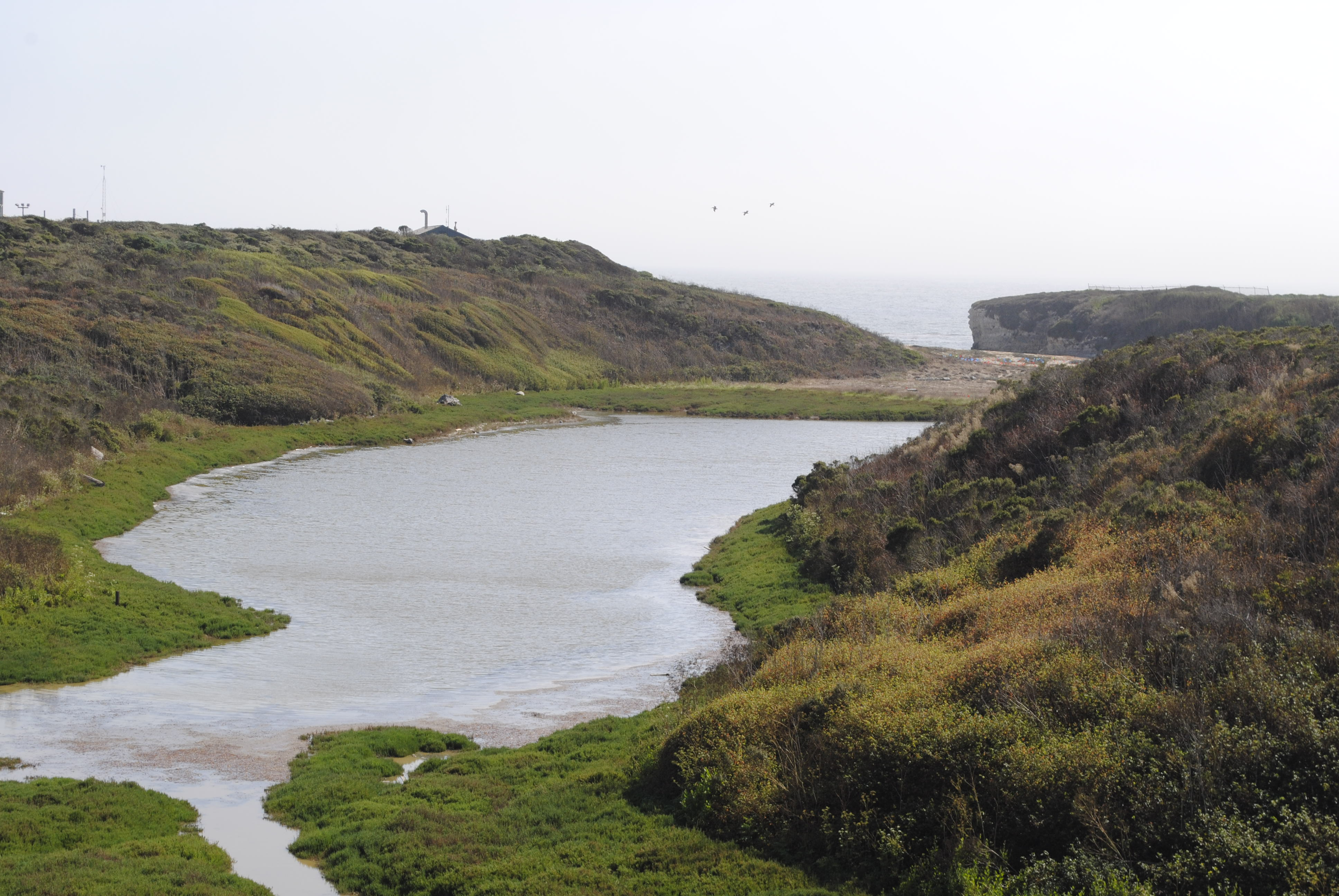

- Location within California Location within the United States
- Location: 100 Shaffer Road, Santa Cruz, California
- Coordinates: 36°57′N 122°4′W
- Area: 72 acres (0.113 mi^{2})
- Governing body: University of California, Santa Cruz
- Website: http://ucsantacruz.ucnrs.org/reserves/younger-lagoon/

Younger Lagoon Reserve is a 72-acre (28-hectare) University of California Natural Reserve System reserve on the northern shore of Monterey Bay in Santa Cruz County, California. The site is owned by the University of California and managed for teaching and research. It is adjacent to Long Marine Laboratory.

The reserve encompasses a pocket beach, seasonal lagoon, wetlands, and coastal prairie on the western edge of the city of Santa Cruz. Other features include a sea stack, sea caves, and tidepools.

== History ==
Donald and Marion Younger, whose family had owned a ranch in the area for over a century, donated the reserve to the University of California in 1972 to enable development of Long Marine Laboratory and protect the lagoon. The reserve was made part of the UC Natural Reserve System in 1987. The university added 47 acres of adjacent farm fields, an area known as Terrace Point, to the 25-acre reserve in 2008 as part of the establishment of its Coastal Science Campus.

== Geography ==
The reserve sits on the lowest and southernmost of the series of marine terraces that make up the Santa Cruz coastline. The lagoon was formed by a coastal stream when ocean waves eroded the sea caves beneath the coastal bluffs.

The Y-shaped lagoon is seasonal, filling with winter and spring rains until winter storms erode the sandy berm at its mouth. At this point, the entire lagoon drains over the course of a few hours. Ocean waters fill the lagoon until waves reform the berm, enabling rain and runoff to freshen the waters again.

== Ecology ==
The federally endangered tidewater goby (Eucyclogobius newberryi) is the most abundant fish species in the lagoon. Surrounding terrestrial habitats feature willow thickets, dune plants, and pickleweed marsh. Common animals range from brush rabbits and striped skunks to coyote and bobcat. Shorebirds such as willets and sanderlings forage on the beach.

== Restoration efforts ==
Younger Lagoon deploys interns and students to restore native vegetation around the lagoon and along the coastal prairie. Their experiments revegetating bluffs covered with non-native iceplant and remnants of brussels sprout fields inform research on habitat restoration. Cape Ivy has spread throughout some areas.

Other experiments include understanding the effects of extreme drought on coastal prairie restoration across time. These studies were set up in collaboration with a global network of drought researchers called the International Drought Experiment. Published work from the reserve indicates that certain traits such as slow growth rates and high leaf lobedness can decrease mortality risk when plants experience drought. Studies at the International Drought Experiment plots also indicate that nonperiodic restoration activities, such as one-off planting or weeding events, can facilitate coyote bush invasion in restored coastal grasslands.
