= Natural Bridges State Marine Reserve =

Marine protected area in Santa Cruz, California, USA

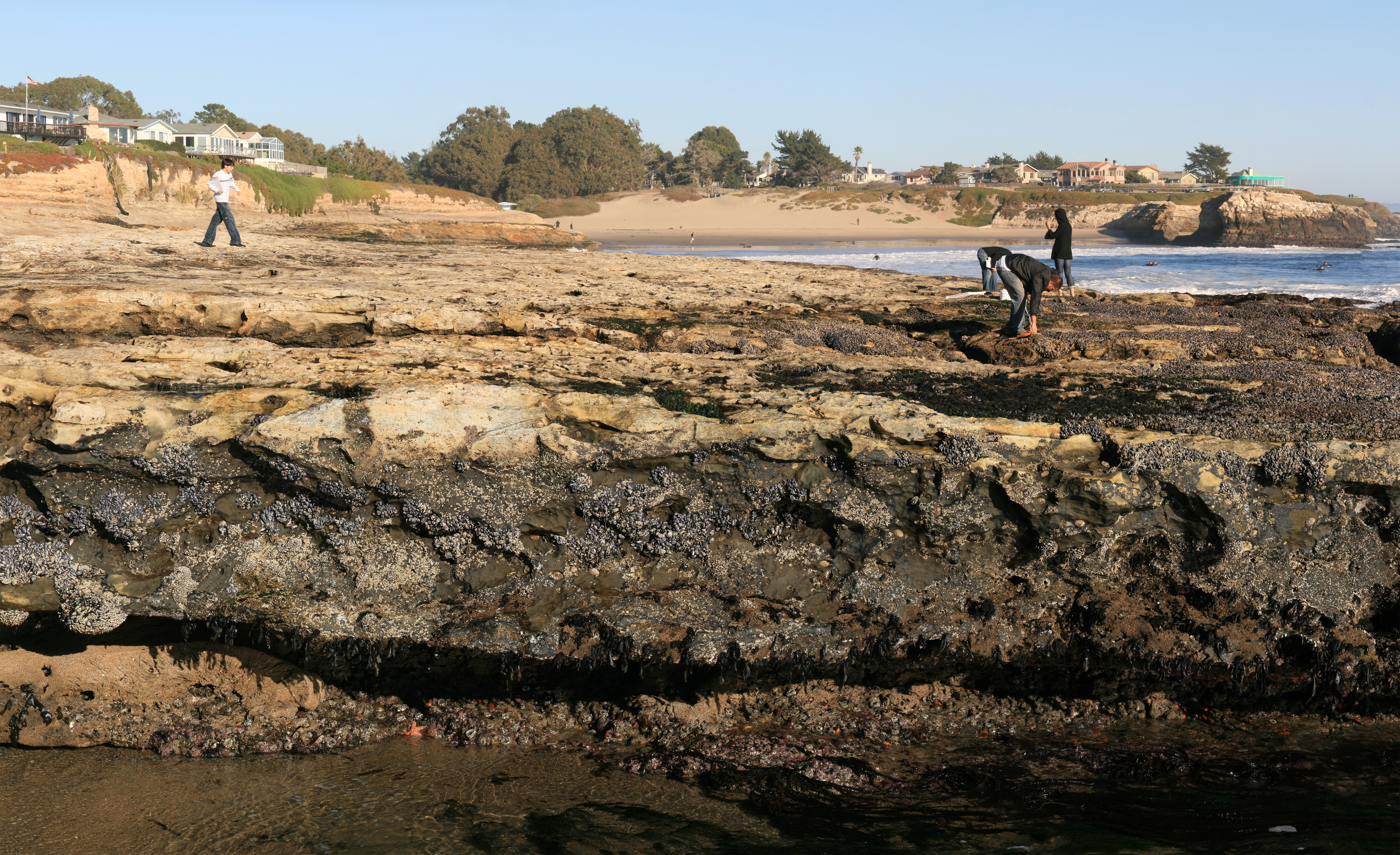
- The intertidal zone at Natural Bridges is home to mussels, sea stars, sea anemones and limpets, seen here being studied by children.

- Location within California Location within the United States
- Nearest city: Santa Cruz, California
- Coordinates: 36.9562384°N 122.1354725°W
- Established: 2007
- Governing body: California Department of Fish and Game

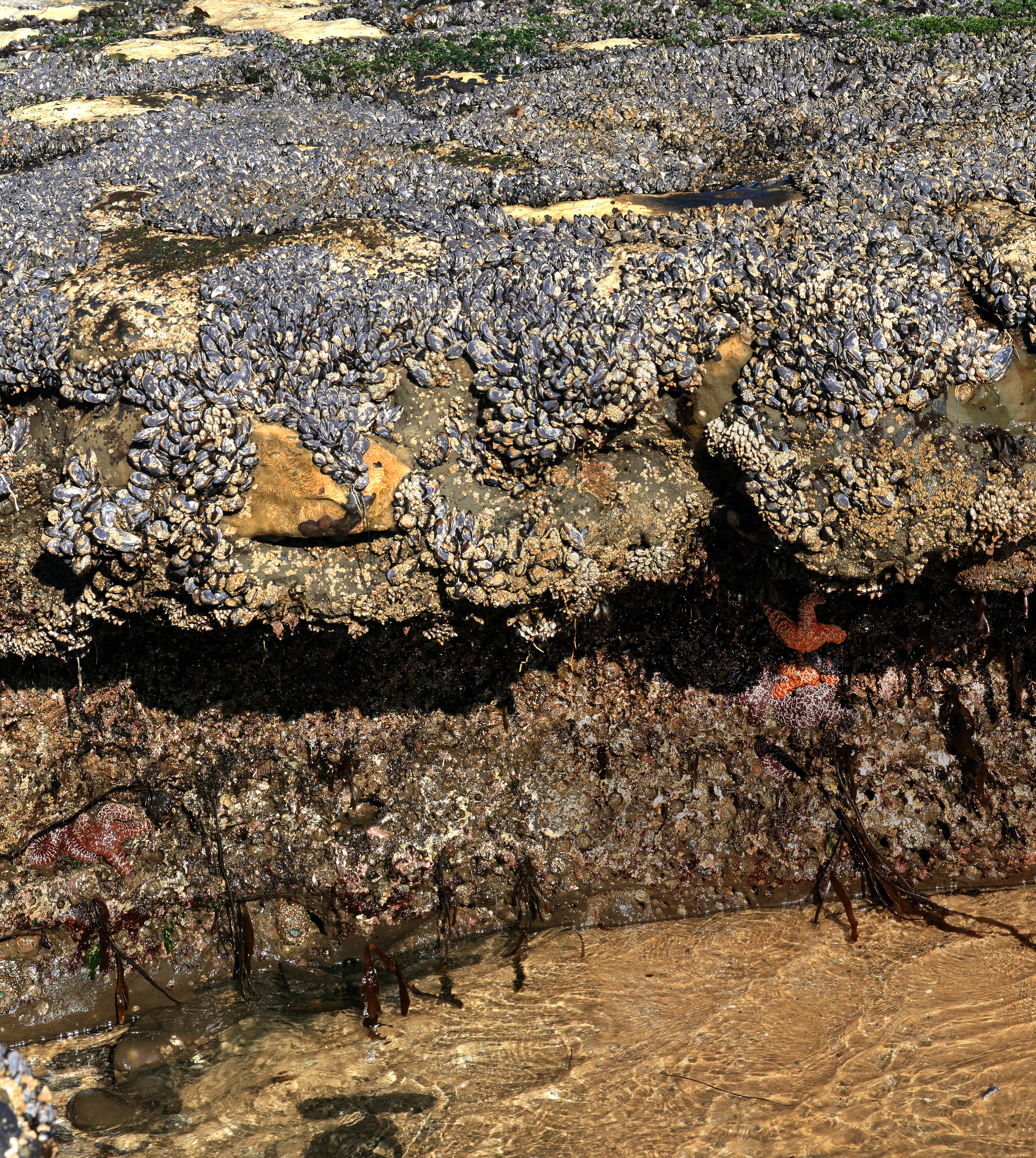
Tide pool at Natural Bridges

Natural Bridges State Marine Reserve (SMR) is a marine protected area located at the northern edge of Santa Cruz, California, approximately 75 miles (121 km) south of San Francisco. The SMR covers 0.58 square miles (1.5 km^{2}). The SMR protects all marine life within its boundaries. Fishing or other removal of any living marine resource is prohibited.

== History ==
The California Department of Fish and Game established the Natural Bridges State Marine Reserve in September 2007. It was one of 29 marine protected areas adopted during the first phase of the Marine Life Protection Act Initiative (MLPAI), a collaborative public process to create a statewide network of marine protected areas along the California coastline.

== Geography and natural features ==
Natural Bridges SMR is adjacent to Natural Bridges State Beach and Wilder Ranch State Park.

The marine protected area is bounded by the mean high tide line and a distance of 200 feet (61 m) seaward of mean lower low water between the following two points:

- 36° 57.90’ N. lat. 122° 07.65’ W. long.; and
- 36° 57.00’ N. lat. 122° 03.50’ W. long.

== Habitat and wildlife ==
Dramatic wave-cut platforms, exposed rocky cliffs, salt marsh, and sandy and rocky shores provide habitat for a wide range of species that inhabit Natural Bridges. These habitats include sandy beach, rocky intertidal, and surfgrass.

== Recreation and nearby attractions ==
Adjacent to the SMR is Natural Bridges State Beach which features tidepools and the Monarch Butterfly Natural Preserve. The Monarch Grove is home to migrating monarch butterflies from mid-October through the end of February. Docent–led butterfly, tidepool, and nature trail tours are available.

Also adjacent is Wilder Ranch State Park, which has 34 miles (55 km) of hiking, biking, and equestrian trails. Historic farm buildings have been restored and the park conducts tours and living history demonstrations.

The University of California, Santa Cruz's Long Marine Laboratory and its public aquarium, the Seymour Marine Discovery Center, are also adjacent. Long Marine Laboratory is an oceanside research and educational facility. Limited tours are available.

California's government encourages recreational and educational uses of the ocean and the marine protected areas. Activities such as kayaking, diving, snorkeling, and swimming are allowed unless otherwise restricted.

For a virtual tour of the underwater park click here

== Monitoring ==
As specified by the Marine Life Protection Act, researchers monitor selected marine protected areas along California’s central coast to track their effectiveness and learn more about ocean health. Similar studies in marine protected areas located by the Santa Barbara Channel Islands have detected gradual improvements in fish size and quantity.
