= Coast Dairies State Park =

Protected beach in Santa Cruz County, California

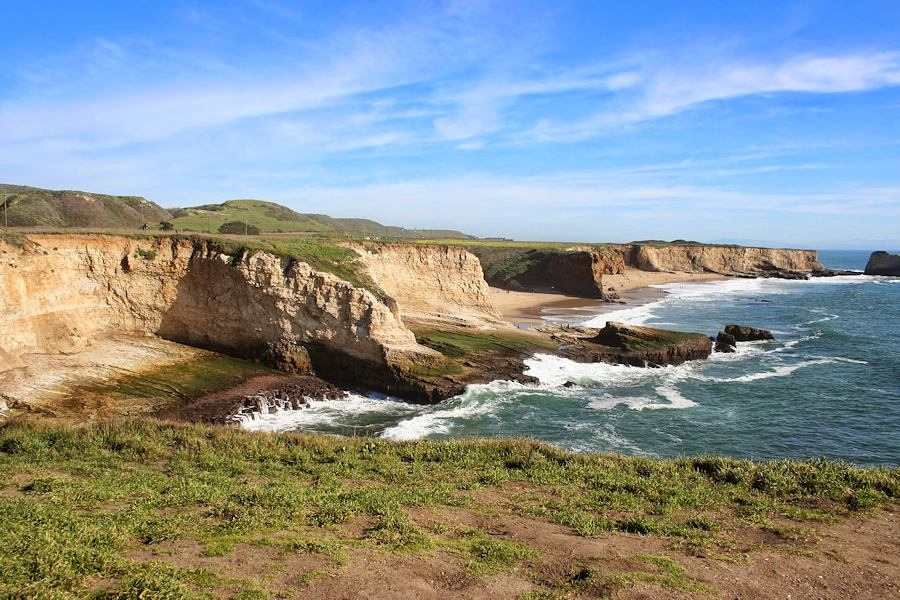
- Panther Beach

- Location within California
- Location: Davenport, CA
- Nearest city: Santa Cruz, California
- Coordinates: 37.01°N 122.19°W
- Area: 5,843 acres (23.65 km^{2})
- Established: 2014
- Governing body: private

Coast Dairies is a state park in Santa Cruz County, California, near the city of Davenport. It is managed as part of Wilder Ranch State Park, which is south of the park.

The new public lands protect a seven-mile (11 km) stretch of coastline and about 7,000 acres (2,800 ha) of prime coastal lands. The beaches, which can be challenging to access, are tied together by the California Coastal Trail, which runs along the top of the bluff. The beaches are Sharktooth, Bonny Doon, Yellow Bank, Laguna Creek, and Panther, although many of these beaches also go by other local and historic names.

The coastal lands on the ocean side of Highway 1 were donated to California State Parks in 2006, but remain undeveloped. The state park land spans a five-mile (8.0 km) segment of Highway 1 north and south of Davenport. In 2014, the Bureau of Land Management bought a 5,800 acres (2,300 ha) tract of land on the inland side of the highway adjacent to the coastal parcels. Some of the land east of the highway will continue to be used for farming, but most became the Cotoni-Coast Dairies unit of California Coastal National Monument.
