= Lighthouse Field State Beach =

State beach in Santa Cruz, California

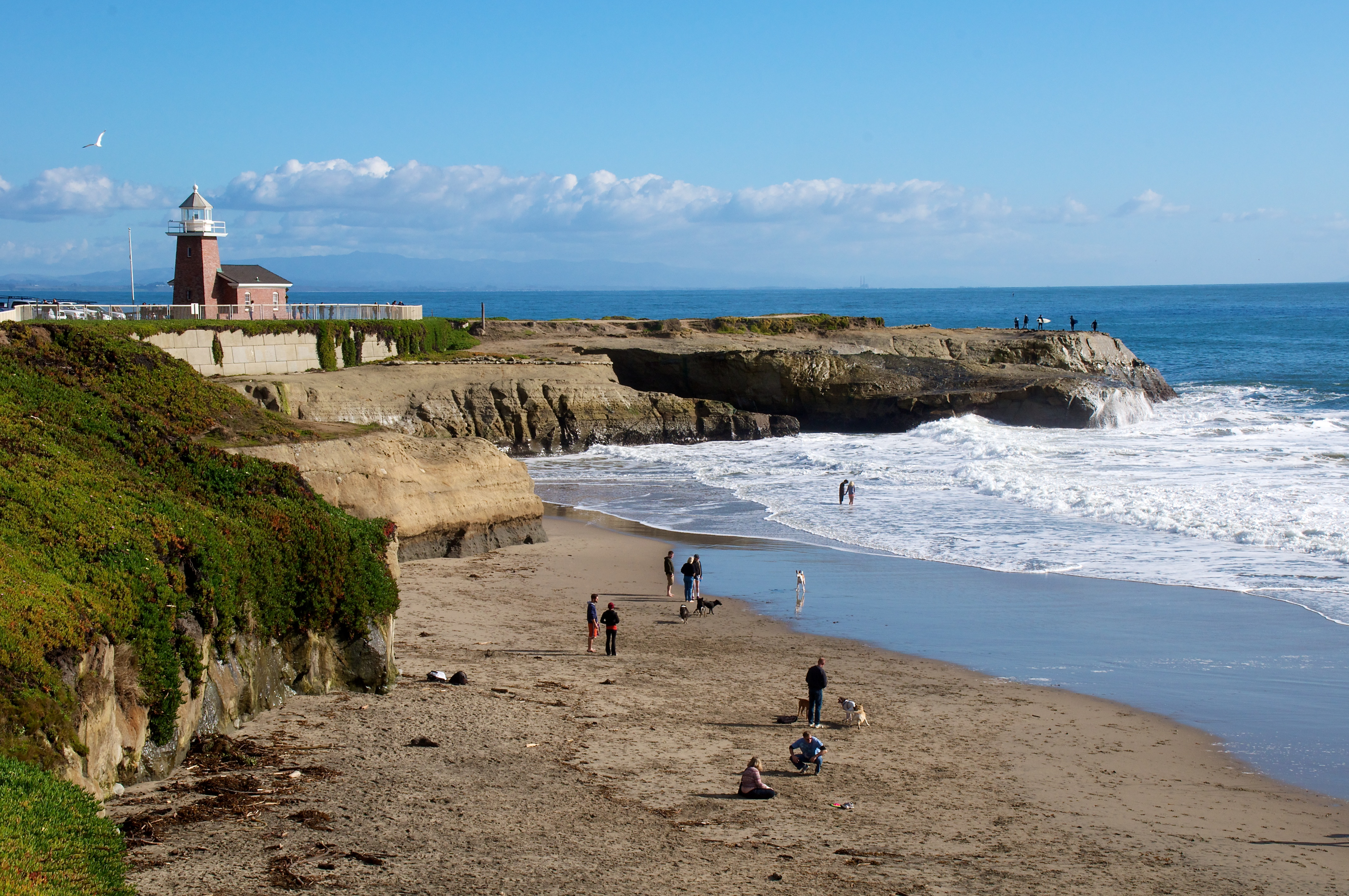

- Location within California Location within the United States
- Location: Santa Cruz County, California, United States
- Nearest city: Santa Cruz, California
- Coordinates: 36°57′7″N 122°1′42″W
- Area: 38 acres (15 ha)
- Established: 1978
- Governing body: California Department of Parks and Recreation

Lighthouse Field State Beach (also called Its Beach) is a protected beach in the state park system of California, United States. It is located in the city of Santa Cruz at the north end of Monterey Bay. The beach overlooks the Steamer Lane surfing hotspot. It also contains the Santa Cruz Surfing Museum, housed in a 1967 lighthouse. The 38-acre (15 ha) site was established in 1978.

== Natural history ==
Lighthouse Field State Beach is a wintering ground for migrating monarch butterflies. Other resident animals include California sea lions and American black swifts. The beach also contains a rock arch at the northern end.

== Recreation ==
Steamer Lane is a famous surfing location. Each Christmas the park hosts Santa Cruz's annual "Caroling under the Stars" event. The park is free to visit year-round, and offers walking trails, wildlife viewing, picnic areas, public restrooms, and outdoor showers.

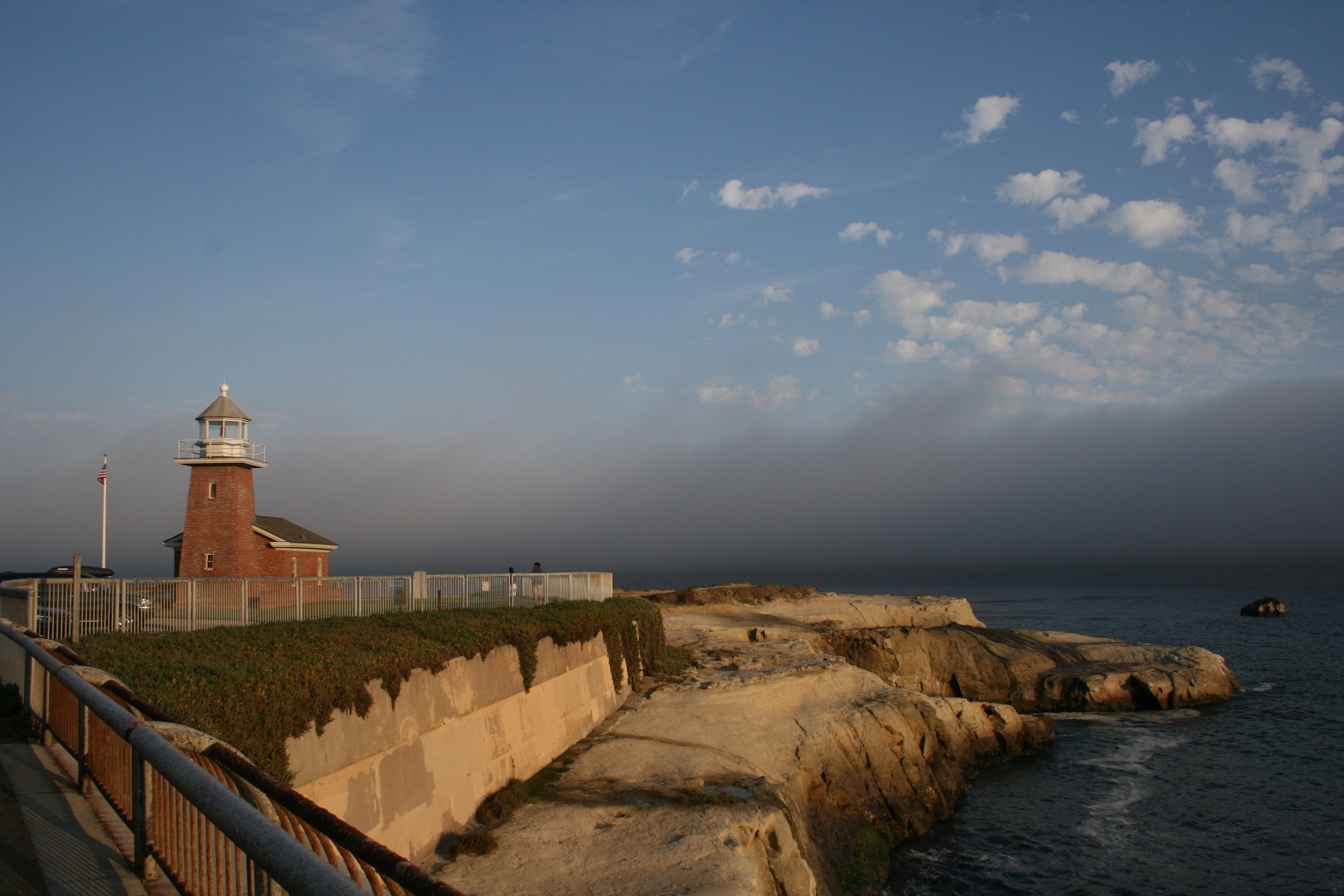
Lighthouse Point

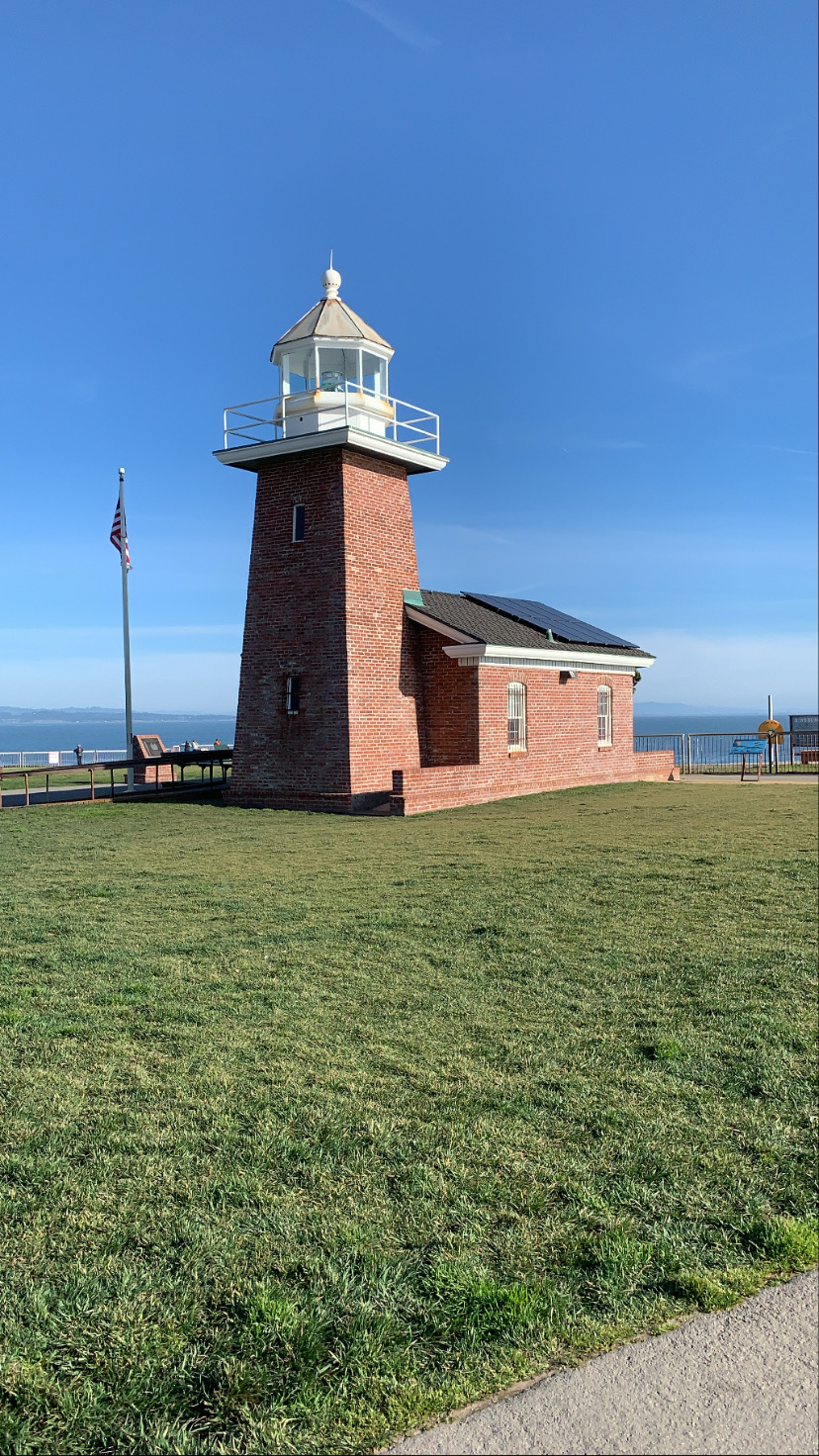
Mark Abbott Memorial Lighthouse

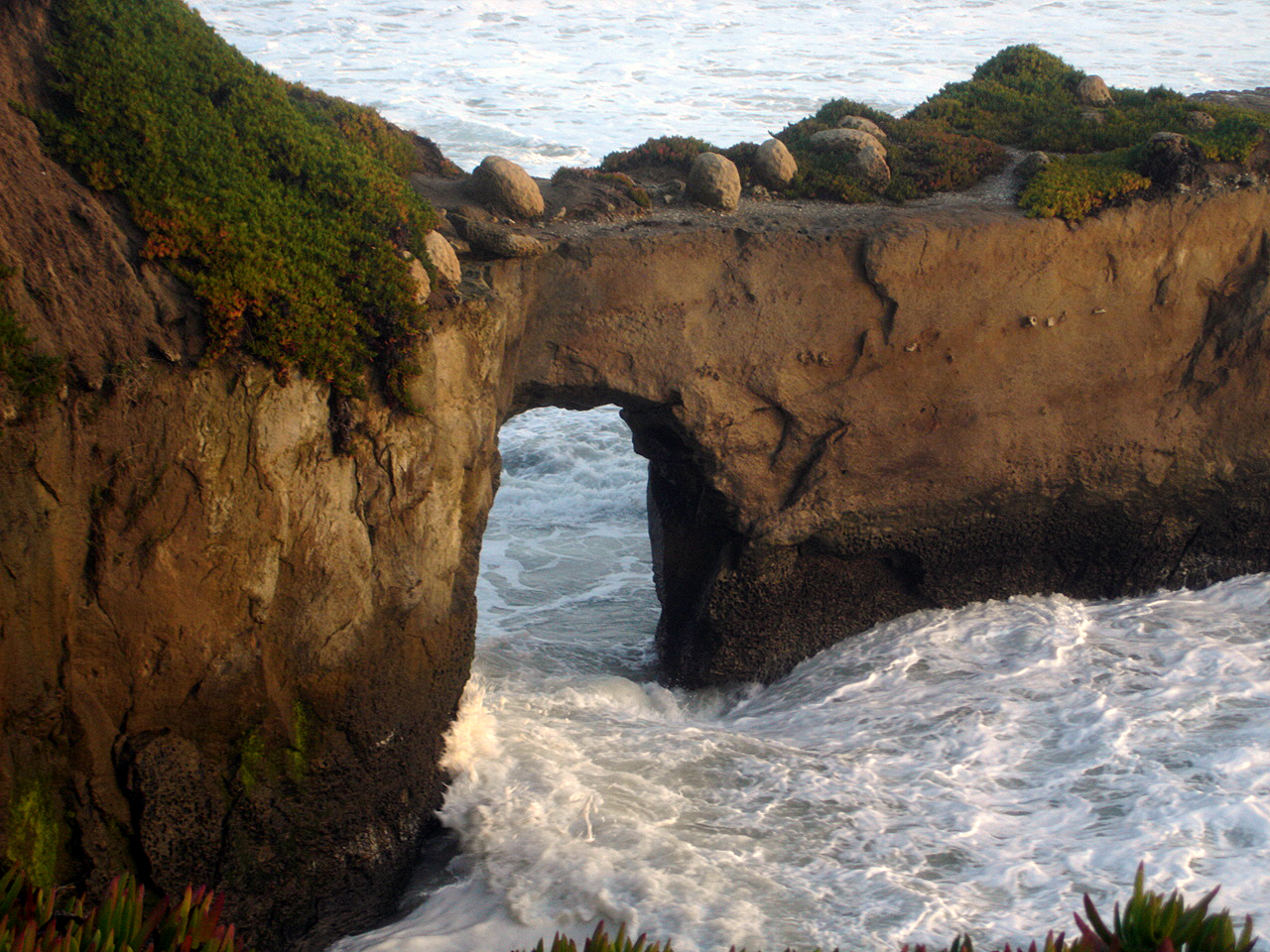
Natural arch

== See also ==
- List of California state parks
- Natural Bridges State Beach
