= Rancho San Vicente (Escamilla) =

Pre-statehood California land grant

Coordinates: 37.080°N 122.190°W

Rancho San Vicente was a 10,803-acre (43.72 km^{2}) Mexican land grant in present day Santa Cruz County, California given in 1846 by Governor Pío Pico to Blas A. Escamilla. The grant extended along the Pacific coast from Molino Creek and Rancho Agua Puerca y las Trancas south past Davenport Landing to San Vicente Creek and Rancho Arroyo de la Laguna. The grant stretched from the coast back into the Santa Cruz Mountains between the two neighboring ranchos. The former Rancho San Vicente lands contain most of today's community of Davenport.

== History ==
This grant, in 1846, was one of the last Mexican grants before the cession of California to the United States following the Mexican-American War. The 1848 Treaty of Guadalupe Hidalgo stipulated that the land grants would be honored. As required by the Land Act of 1851, a claim for Rancho San Vicente was filed with the Public Land Commission in 1853, and the grant was patented to Blas A. Escamilla in 1870. In 1853, Antonio Rodriquez claimed that he was granted two square leagues in 1839 by Governor Juan B. Alvarado. Rodriquez filed a claim for Rancho San Vicente with the Land Commission, but was rejected by the Commission in 1855. In 1865, Blas A. Escamilla sold Rancho San Vicente to the Stanford Brothers (Josiah Stanford (1817–1890), Charles Stanford (1819–1885), and Asa Phillips Stanford (1821–1903)).
