= Laguna Creek (Santa Cruz County) =

Laguna Creek Arroyo de la Laguna, Laguna de Pala
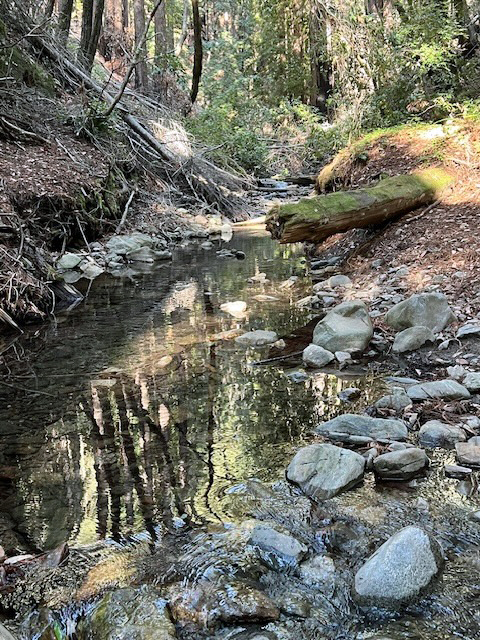
- Laguna Creek in the San Vicente Redwoods east of Bonny Doon, CA in December 2024

- Location of the mouth of Laguna Creek in Santa Cruz County, California

Location
- Country: United States
- State: California
- Region: Santa Cruz County

Physical characteristics
- Source: Southern flank of Ben Lomond Mountain in the Santa Cruz Mountains
  - coordinates: 37°05′03″N 122°08′30″W
  - elevation: 2,210 ft (670 m)
- Mouth: Pacific Ocean
  - coordinates: 36°59′00″N 122°09′14″W
  - elevation: 13 ft (4.0 m)

Basin features
- Tributaries
  - left: Y Creek
  - right: Reggiardo Creek

Laguna Creek is a perennial 8.5-mile-long (13.7 km) southward-flowing stream originating on the southern flank of Ben Lomond Mountain in the Santa Cruz County, California, United States. It culminates in a lagoon (Sp. laguna) before reaching the Pacific Ocean about six miles northwest of Santa Cruz, California.

== History ==
The creek is shown on the 1836 diseño of Rancho Arroyo de la Laguna which ran from Vicente Creek in the north to Laguna Creek in the south. Archaeological excavations at Sand Hill Bluff, just south of Laguna Creek, have produced evidence of ancestral Ohlone people occupation of the area since 5,400 B.C.

== Watershed and Course ==
The Laguna Creek watershed consists of mainstem Laguna Creek, Reggiardo Creek and several mostly unnamed tributaries that drain about 8 square miles (21 km^{2}). The creek arises at 2,210 feet (670 m) on the southern flank of Ben Lomond Mountain in the Santa Cruz Mountains. Y Creek flows 1.6 miles (2.6 km) to join Laguna Creek at stream mile 1.5. Reggiardo Creek joins Laguna Creek from the right (heading downstream) and is the largest named tributary.

== Ecology ==
Steelhead trout (Oncorhynchus mykiss) utilize Laguna Creek historically and in the present, despite 100% diversion of the headwaters to the City of Santa Cruz and heavy cattle grazing on the upper reaches. Waterfalls about 2 miles (3.2 km) from the stream mouth apparently are not an impassable barrier for migrating trout. The Laguna Creek lagoon may host approximately 675 steelhead smolts, providing freshwater refugia for them to attain large enough size for survival in the ocean. Although under current conditions, the creek is not good habitat for coho salmon (Oncorhynchus kisutch), they have been observed in the creek as recently as 2005. The silted in Reggiardo Creek Diversion and Laguna Creek Diversion are high priorities for the Santa Cruz Habitat Conservation Plan because of their impact on low flows for salmonid fishes, reducing flows by up to 45% in critically dry years.

The lagoon, which was diked off and farmed for many years, also provides habitat for endangered tidewater goby (Eucyclogobius newberryi). Levees constraining the creek and its lagoon were removed by State Parks over several years ending in 2010, and were restored using native plants.

== See also ==
- Ben Lomond Mountain AVA
