= Natural Bridges State Beach =

State beach in Santa Cruz, California

- IUCN category III (natural monument or feature)
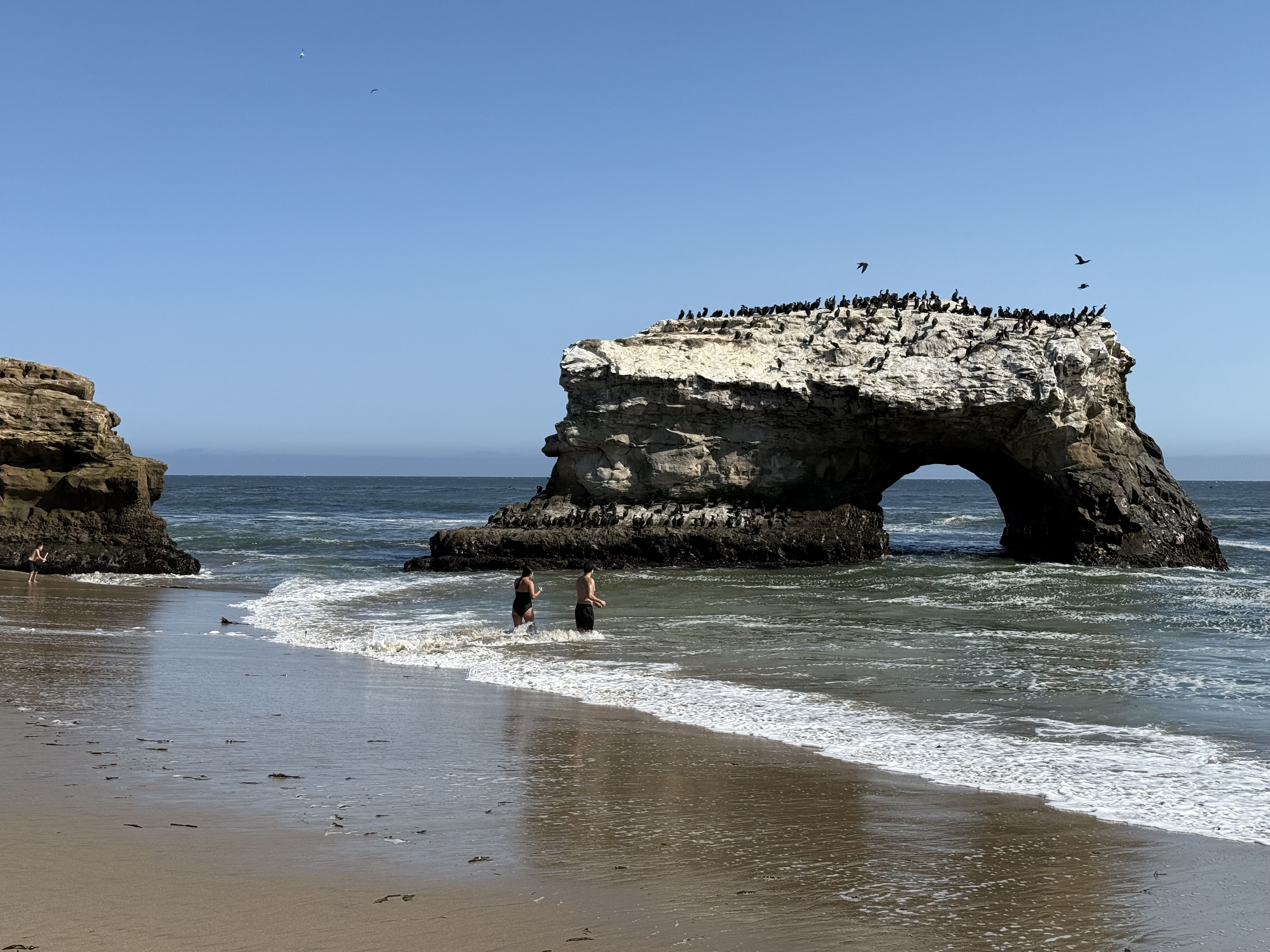
- The last remaining natural bridge provides good refuge for birds

- Location within California
- Location: Santa Cruz County, California, United States
- Coordinates: 36°57′09″N 122°03′27″W
- Area: 65 acres (26 ha)
- Elevation: 0 ft (0 m)
- Established: 1933
- Named for: The natural bridges at Santa Cruz
- Visitors: 925,000
- Governing body: Santa Cruz State Parks
- Website: Natural Bridges State Beach

Natural Bridges State Beach is a 65-acre (26 ha) California state park in Santa Cruz, California, in the United States. The park features a natural bridge across a section of the beach and a eucalyptus grove provides habitat for monarch butterflies. During monarch butterfly migration, Monarch Butterfly Natural Preserve has up to 150,000 monarch butterflies from October through early February.

== History ==
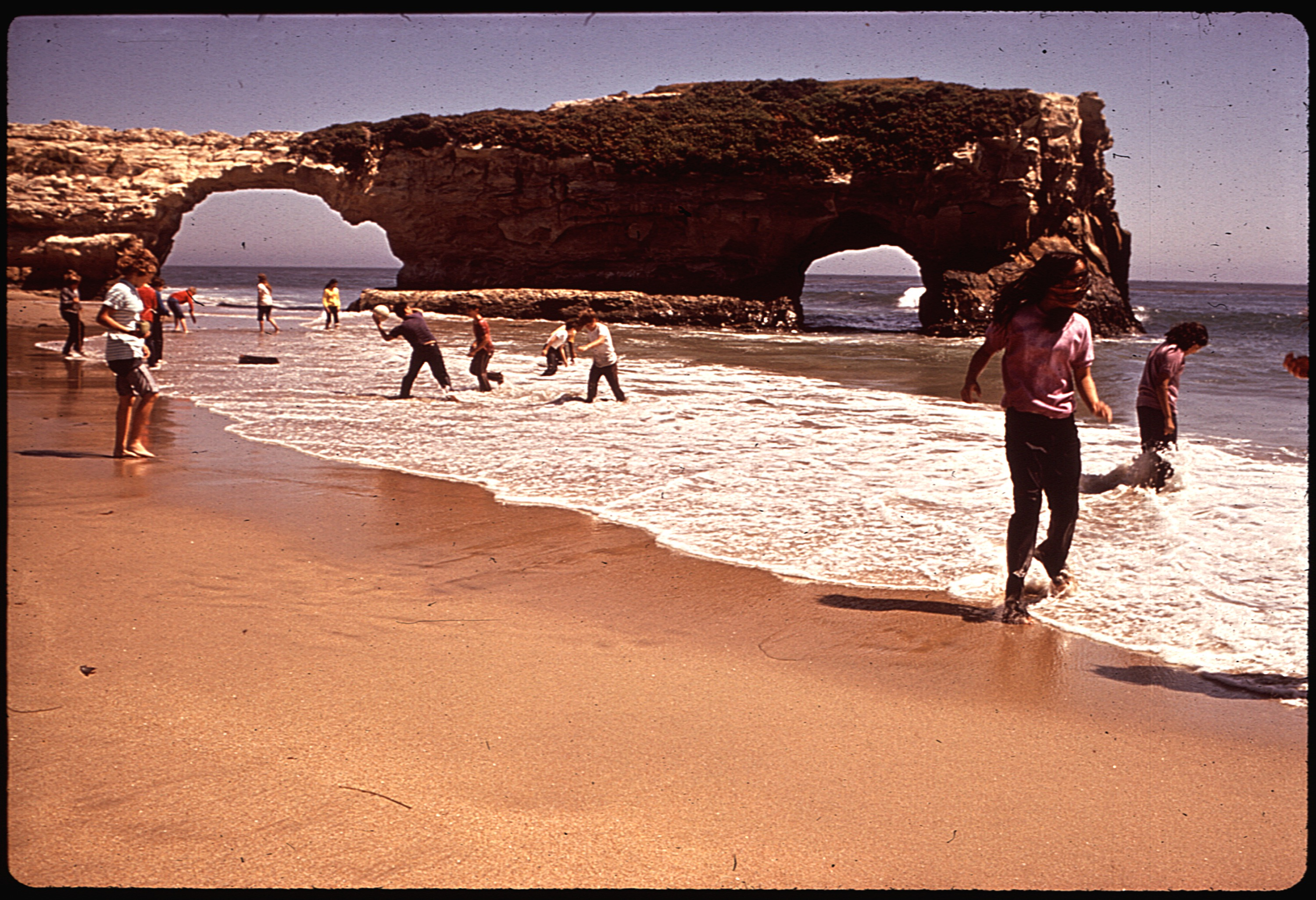
Arches at Natural Bridges in 1970

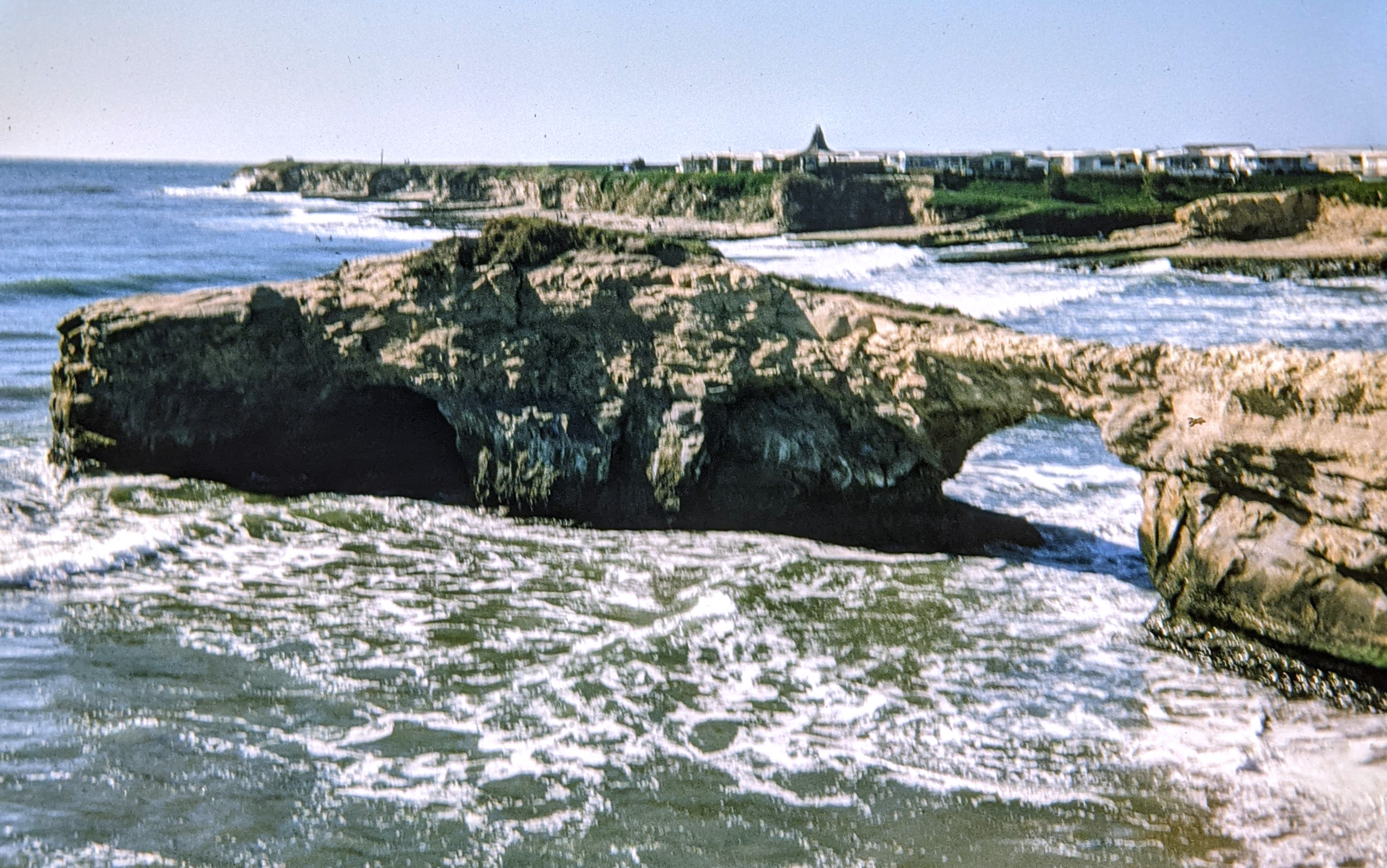
A 1975 view of Natural Bridges from the south

The first inhabitants in the Santa Cruz area were small groups of Native Americans. The Ohlone were a semi-nomadic tribe that hunted game and marine mammals and supplemented their diets with shellfish, fish, edible roots and shoots, acorns, nuts, and seeds. The Ohlone raised medicinal plants and herbs. They made tools from locally found stones and shells. Their crafts included shellfish jewelry and baskets.

The displacement of the natives began with the Spanish colonization of the Americas when missionaries and soldiers brought the Ohlone into the missions. The population of Native Americans was greatly reduced by European diseases to which they had no resistance. Governance of the area was transferred from Spain to Mexico after the Mexican War of Independence. The citizens of Mexico used what is now Natural Bridges State Beach as pasture land for their cattle. California became part of the United States after the Mexican–American War.

The area in and around the park later supported a dairy farm, a brussels sprouts farm, hotel, housing for mill workers, a South Seas movie set and a failed housing development. The land was purchased by the State of California in 1933 and construction of the state beach facilities began in 1954. The land surrounding the park was largely wild and undeveloped until the 1970s. The park is now surrounded by beach development and commercial properties.

== Geology ==
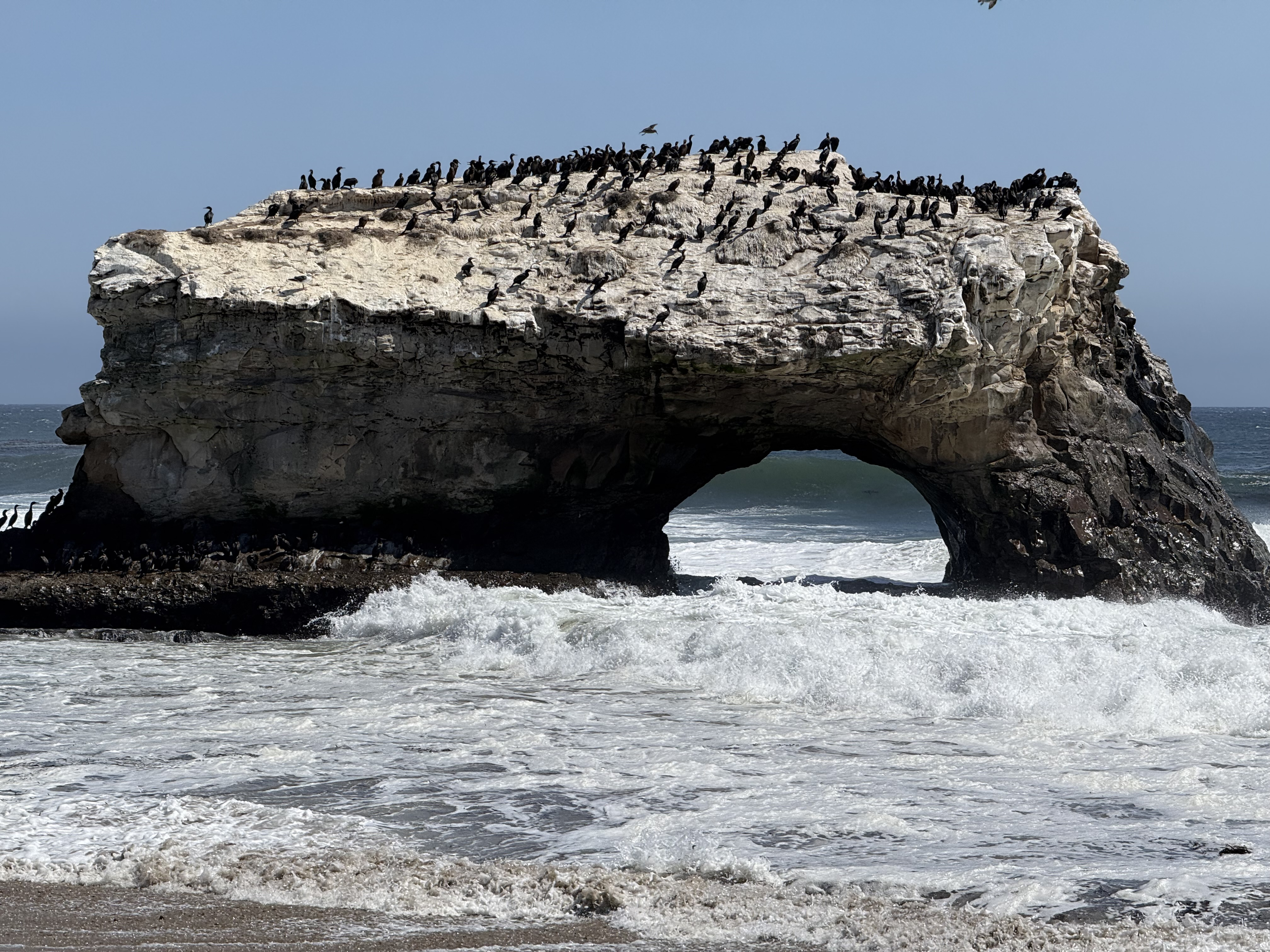
The natural bridge.

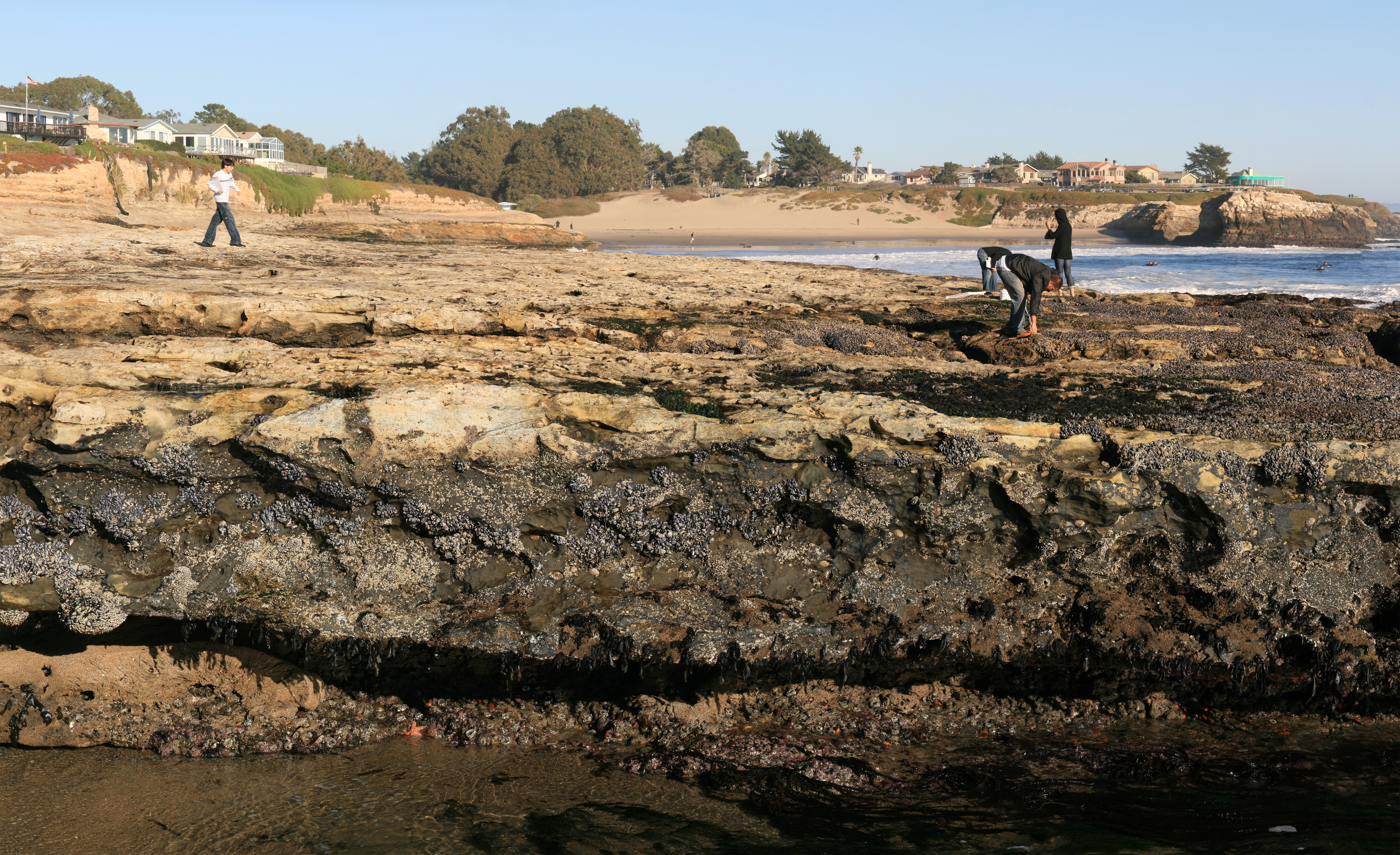
The intertidal zone is home to mussels, sea stars, sea anemones and limpets, seen here being studied by children.

Natural Bridges State Beach is named for the naturally occurring mudstone bridges that were carved by the Pacific Ocean into cliffs that jutted out into the sea.

The arches formed over a million years ago when a combination of silt, clay and diatoms were solidified into a mixture of stone that formed the three original arches of the beach. Wave erosion carved the arches and then cut away the cliffs leaving only islands.

Of the three original arches only the middle one remains. The outermost arch fell sometime in 1905 or 1906, and the inner arch collapsed during a storm on the night of January 10, 1980. The middle arch is in danger of collapsing as well due to erosion by wind and waves. Visitors were formerly permitted to climb up, walk and even drive on the bridges. Now the arch is closed to public access.

== Ecology ==
Natural Bridges State Beach is home to a eucalyptus grove that provided habitat for monarch butterflies. Up to 150,000 butterflies migrate up to 2,000 miles (3,200 km) to the park to escape the cold weather of winter in the northwestern United States and Canada. The city of Santa Cruz holds an annual festival to mark the return of the butterflies. Monarchs settle in groves along the coasts of California and Baja California. At Natural Bridges State Beach they find shelter from the wind and sources of water and food. The butterflies cluster onto the trees, "intertwining their legs among the branches to resemble a clump of leaves". The butterflies protect each other from cold winter winds and rains by clustering together. Beginning in the late 1990s the population of butterflies at the park began to decline. Biologist attribute the decline to a lack of habitat caused by fallen pine and eucalyptus trees. The decline at Natural Bridges State Beach has meant an increase in butterfly numbers at nearby Lighthouse Field State Beach.

The 65-acre (26 ha) of the park have a variety of habitats. Saltwater and freshwater marshes are found on Moore Creek. Coastal Scrub surrounds the margins and undeveloped interior areas of the park. Sand dunes and a fresh water pond are also found at the park.

Tide pools at the beach provide a glimpse into marine life habitat for visitors to the park. Receding tides reveal populations of urchins, sea stars, hermit crabs, and kelp. Marine mammals, such as whales, seals, and sea otters can be seen from the beach. In combination with the estuarine mouth of Moore Creek, the state beach provides habitat for a variety of bird species, such as shorebirds, gulls, and snowy egrets. Brown pelicans and cormorants can often be found on the remaining natural bridge.

Natural Bridges State Marine Reserve is a marine protected area off the coast of Natural Bridges State Beach. Like an underwater park, this marine protected area helps conserve ocean wildlife and marine ecosystems.

== Recreation ==
Natural Bridges State Beach is open to year-round recreation including swimming, surfing, hiking, nature walks and picnics. The beach is small and sheltered. The afternoon winds attract kite flying and wind surfing. The beach is open to surfing and is busiest during the winter when large swells wash up onto the shores of Natural Bridges State Beach. Hiking trails pass through the Moore Creek estuary and the Monarch Butterfly Nature Preserve. Guided tours of the butterfly preserve take place on weekends during the fall and winter. Tours of the tidal pools take place year-round as do nature walks.

== Nearby state parks ==
- The Forest of Nisene Marks State Park
- Henry Cowell Redwoods State Park
- Lighthouse Field State Beach
- New Brighton State Beach
- Santa Cruz Mission State Historic Park
- Seacliff State Beach
- Twin Lakes State Beach
- Wilder Ranch State Park

== See also ==
- List of beaches in California
- List of California state parks
