= Brighton (disambiguation) =

Brighton is a seaside resort and part of the city of Brighton and Hove in the UK.

Brighton may also refer to:

== Places ==
=== United Kingdom ===
- Brighton, East Sussex, England
  - Borough of Brighton, a district of East Sussex until 1997
  - Brighton (UK Parliament constituency), 1832–1950
- Brighton, Cornwall, a hamlet in Cornwall, England
- Brightons, a village in Falkirk, Scotland

=== Australia ===
- Brighton, Queensland, a suburb of Brisbane
- Brighton, South Australia, a coastal suburb of Adelaide
  - Electoral district of Brighton (South Australia), a former electoral district in South Australia
- Brighton, Tasmania, a suburb of Hobart
  - Electoral district of Brighton (Tasmania), a former electoral district in Tasmania
- Brighton, Victoria, a suburb of Melbourne
  - Electoral district of Brighton, an electoral district in Victoria
- Brighton-Le-Sands, New South Wales, a suburb of Sydney

=== Canada ===
- Brighton Parish, New Brunswick, geographic parish
- Brighton, a neighborhood of Charlottetown, Prince Edward Island
- Brighton, Digby, Nova Scotia, a community in Digby County
- Brighton, Newfoundland and Labrador, a town
- Brighton, Ontario, a town
- Brighton, Shelburne, Nova Scotia, a community in Shelburne County

=== Jamaica ===
- Brighton, Jamaica, a town

=== New Zealand ===
- Brighton, New Zealand, Otago region, a town

=== Trinidad and Tobago ===
- Brighton, Trinidad and Tobago, a Locality near La Brea, Trinidad and Tobago

=== United States ===
(Alphabetical by state)

- Brighton, Alabama, a city
- Brighton, Colorado, a home rule municipality
- Brighton Seminole Indian Reservation, Florida
- Brighton, Georgia, an unincorporated community
- Brighton, Illinois, a village
- Brighton Park, Chicago, Illinois, a neighbourhood
- Brighton, Indiana, an unincorporated community
- Brighton, Iowa, a city
- Brighton Plantation, Maine
- Brighton, Boston, a dissolved municipality and current neighborhood of Boston, Massachusetts
- Brighton, Michigan, a suburb in metro Detroit
- Brighton, Missouri, an unincorporated community
- Brighton, Erie County, New York, an unincorporated area in the town of Tonawanda
- Brighton, Franklin County, New York, a town
- Brighton, Monroe County, New York, a town and census-designated place
- Brighton, Syracuse, New York, an official neighborhood of Syracuse
- Brighton Beach, New York, a neighborhood of Brooklyn, New York City, sometimes referred to merely as Brighton
- Brighton, Clark County, Ohio, an unincorporated community
- Brighton, Lorain County, Ohio, an unincorporated community
- Brighton, Oregon, an unincorporated community
- Brighton, Tennessee, a town
- Brighton Ski Resort, Utah
- Brighton, Utah, an unincorporated community
- Brighton, Vermont, a town
- Brighton, Seattle, Washington, a neighborhood
- Brighton (community), Kenosha County, Wisconsin, an unincorporated community
- Brighton, Kenosha County, Wisconsin, a town
- Brighton, Marathon County, Wisconsin, a town
- Brighton Township (disambiguation)

== Schools ==
- Brighton College, a boarding and day school established in 1845 in Brighton, England
- Brighton High School (disambiguation)
- University of Brighton, with five campuses in Brighton, Eastbourne and Hastings, England

== Sports ==
- Brighton & Hove Albion F.C., a football club who compete in the English premier league
- Brighton & Hove Albion W.F.C., a women's football club associated with the above
- Brighton Football Club (RFU), one of the oldest rugby clubs in England
- Brighton Football Club (Tasmania), an Australian rules football club
- Brighton Football Club, a former Australian rules football club based in the Melbourne suburb of Brighton

== Vessels ==
- HMS Brighton, the name of three ships of the Royal Navy
- SS Brighton, the name of several steamships

== Other uses ==
- Brighton, a character in the video game Mario Party 6
- Brighton Collectibles, a corporation that sells handbags, jewelry, shoes and more
- Brighton Mazhindu, Zimbabwean politician

== See also ==
- Bright (disambiguation), for towns named Bright (ie "Bright town")
- Brighton High School (disambiguation)
- Brighton College (disambiguation)
- Brighton School (disambiguation)
- Brighton Beach (disambiguation)
- New Brighton (disambiguation)
