= SS Brighton =

SS Brighton can refer to the following ships:

- SS Brighton (1847), constructed for London, Brighton and South Coast Railway, sold in 1850 to Italy
- PS Brighton (1878), constructed for London, Brighton and South Coast Railway, sold in 1893
- PS Brighton (1882), Sydney Harbour ferry between 1883 and 1912.
- SS Brighton (1903), constructed for London, Brighton and South Coast Railway, sold to the Southern Railway in 1923, Sold again in 1930 and converted to a private yacht, wrecked 1933
- SS Brighton (1928), built for R Chapman and Sons. Struck a mine and sank in 1940.
- SS Brighton (1933), built for the Southern Railway. Requisitioned by the Admiralty for use as a hospital ship in World War II. Bombed and sunk in 1940
- SS Brighton (1949), built for British Railways. Sold to Jersey Lines in 1967 and renamed La Duchesse de Bretagne. Scrapped in 1970.

== See also ==
- Sports Stadium Brighton, often referred to as "SS Brighton", was the original name of the sports stadium used by the Brighton Tigers ice hockey team in England.
- HMS Brighton
- Brighton (disambiguation)
