= Brighton College (disambiguation) =

Brighton College may refer to:

- Brighton College, Brighton, England, UK
  - Brighton College Preparatory School, Brighton, England, UK; part of Brighton College
  - Brighton College Abu Dhabi, United Arab Emirates; see Brighton College
- Brighton College (Canada), in British Columbia
- Brighton College, Manly, a former girls' private school in Manly, New South Wales, Australia
- Brighton Secondary College, Bayside, Brighton East, Victoria, Australia
- City College Brighton & Hove, Brighton, Brighton and Hove, East Sussex, England, UK
- Brighton Hove & Sussex Sixth Form College, Hove, East Sussex, England, UK
- University of Brighton, England. UK; formed by the merger of Brighton College of Art and Brighton College of Technology and Brighton College of Education
  - the colleges of the University of Brighton

== See also ==
- Brighton and Sussex University Hospitals NHS Trust
- Brighton and Sussex Medical School, Brighton, Sussex, England, UK
- Brighton Hill Community School, Brighton Hill, Basingstoke, Hampshire, England, UK
- Brighton International University, Casamance, Senegal
- Brighton High School (disambiguation)
- Brighton School (disambiguation)
- Brighton (disambiguation)
