= Brighton High School =

Brighton High School may refer to:

== Australia ==
- Brighton Secondary College (formerly Brighton High School) in suburban Melbourne
- Brighton Secondary School (formerly Brighton High School) in suburban Adelaide

== England ==
- Brighton and Hove High School
- Brighton College, day and boarding school

== United States ==
- Brighton High School (Brighton, Colorado)
- Brighton High School (Brighton, Massachusetts)
- Brighton High School (Brighton, Michigan)
- Brighton High School (Rochester, New York)
- Brighton High School (Brighton, Tennessee)
- Brighton High School (Cottonwood Heights, Utah)

== See also ==
- Brighton School (disambiguation)
- Brighton College (disambiguation)
- Brighton (disambiguation)
