= Brighton stadium =

Brighton stadium may refer to several stadiums in or near Brighton, England:

- Falmer Stadium, on the outskirts of Brighton, the current home ground of Brighton & Hove Albion Football Club (BHAFC)
- Goldstone Ground in Hove, home ground of BHAFC 1902–1997. Now demolished.
- Withdean Stadium, an athletics stadium, temporarily used by BHAFC 1999–2011
- Sports Stadium Brighton, or SS Brighton, in central Brighton, originally a swimming pool, later an ice rink, home of the Brighton Tigers ice hockey club. Now demolished.
- Brighton & Hove Greyhound Stadium, near Hove Park

== See also ==
- County Cricket Ground, Hove
