= Brighton Beach (disambiguation) =

Brighton Beach is a community on Coney Island, in the borough of Brooklyn, New York City.

Brighton, Brighton Beach, or Brighton Beachside may also refer to the following places:

== Place names ==
=== Beaches ===
- Brighton Beach (South Georgia), a beach in South Georgia and the South Sandwich Islands
- Brighton Beach, a popular local beach in Brighton, South Australia
- New Brighton State Beach, colloquially known as "Brighton Beach", in Santa Cruz, California
- Dendy Street Beach, in Brighton, Victoria, a beach-side suburb of Melbourne, Australia

=== Settlements ===
- Brighton, a seaside resort in East Sussex, England
- Brighton Beach, a neighbourhood of Windsor, Ontario, Canada
- Brighton-Le-Sands, New South Wales, a beach-side suburb of Sydney, Australia
- Brighton Beach, a community in Duluth, Minnesota
- Brighton Beach, an unincorporated area in Georgina, Ontario
- Brighton Beach, a community in the District of North Vancouver, British Columbia
- Brighton Beach, a developer name for the suburb of Jindalee, Western Australia
- Brighton Beach, a community in Long Beach Township, New Jersey
- Brighton Beach, a local government in Perth, Australia, gazetted locality by the City of Stirling in the suburb of Scarborough
- Brighton Beachside, a developer name for the suburb of Butler, Western Australia

== Transportation ==
- Brighton Beach (BMT Brighton Line), the subway station (B and Q trains) serving Brighton Beach, Brooklyn, New York City
- Brighton Beach railway station in the Melbourne, Australia suburb of Brighton

== See also ==
- Brighton Beach Memoirs, a play by Neil Simon
  - Brighton Beach Memoirs (film), the adaptation of the play
- Brighton hotel bombing
- Brighton (disambiguation)
