= Brighton, Australia =

There is more than one place in Australia called Brighton.

- Brighton, Queensland, a suburb of Brisbane
- Brighton, South Australia, a coastal suburb of Adelaide
- Brighton, Tasmania
- Brighton, Victoria, a suburb of Melbourne
- Brighton, Western Australia, a suburb of Perth
- Brighton-Le-Sands, New South Wales, a suburb of Sydney

== See also ==
- Brighton (disambiguation)
