= Brighton School =

Brighton School may refer to:

Brighton Schools

- Brighton School (filmmaking), a loosely associated group of filmmakers active in the Brighton and Hove area of England 1896-1910
- Brighton School (Sacramento, California), a property on the National Register of Historic Places
- Brighton School (Lynnwood, Washington), a private K-8 school
- Brighton School (Toronto)

Schools of Brighton

- Brighton Area Schools, Brighton, Metro Detroit, Michigan, USA
- Brighton Central School District, Monroe County, New York State, USA
- List of schools in Brighton and Hove, East Sussex, England, UK
  - List of former board schools in Brighton and Hove

== See also ==
- Brighton Grammar School, Brighton, Melbourne, Victoria, Australia
- Brighton Business School, University of Brighton, Brighton, Sussex, England, UK
- Brighton and Sussex Medical School, Brighton, Sussex, England, UK
- Brighton High School (disambiguation)
- Brighton College (disambiguation)
- Brighton (disambiguation)
