= New Brighton =

New Brighton is the name of several places, sports teams etc.:

== Australia ==
- New Brighton, New South Wales, a town near Ocean Shores

== Canada ==
- New Brighton, Calgary, Alberta, a neighborhood
- New Brighton (Gambier Island), a settlement in British Columbia

== New Zealand ==
- New Brighton, New Zealand, a suburb of Christchurch

== South Africa ==
- New Brighton, Johannesburg, a suburb
- New Brighton, Eastern Cape, a township and suburb of Port Elizabeth

== United Kingdom ==
- New Brighton, Bradford, a location in West Yorkshire
- New Brighton, Hampshire, a location
- New Brighton, Leeds, West Yorkshire
- New Brighton, Merseyside, a seaside resort in Wallasey, England
  - New Brighton A.F.C., the current football club
  - New Brighton Tower F.C., a former football club
  - New Brighton F.C. (rugby union), a rugby union club
- New Brighton, Flintshire, a village in the county of Flintshire, Wales
- New Brighton, Wrexham, a hamlet in Wrexham County Borough, Wales

== United States ==
- New Brighton, Minnesota, a city
- New Brighton, Pennsylvania, a borough
- New Brighton State Beach in California
- New Brighton, Staten Island, a neighborhood in New York City
  - New Brighton station (Staten Island Railway), closed

== See also ==
- Brighton (disambiguation)
