= Brighton, Nova Scotia =

Brighton, Nova Scotia could be one of following two communities:

- Brighton, Shelburne, Nova Scotia near the town of Lockeport in Shelburne County
- Brighton, Digby, Nova Scotia in Digby County
