= Grice hockey =

Adaption of Ice Hockey played on Grass

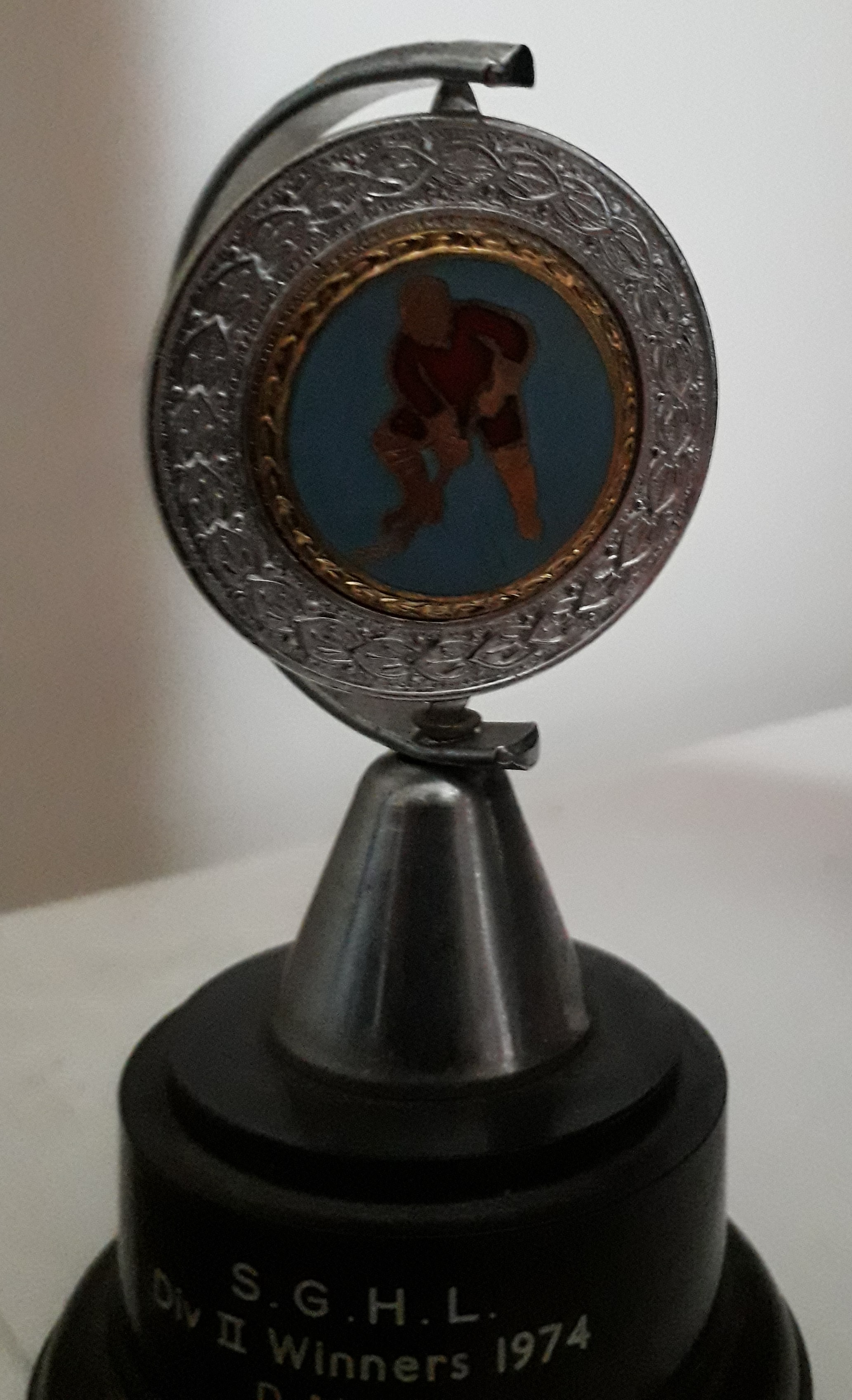
Grice Hockey Trophy

Grice hockey was a cross between standard field hockey and ice hockey played in the South of England in the latter half of the 20th century. Teams were mainly based in South London and Brighton with one in Chichester.

== History ==
The Streatham Exiles, playing on Sunday mornings at Tooting Bec Common, claimed to have originated the game of Grice Hockey c. 1957, arising out of many of the participants interested in Ice Hockey, and organising trips to Ice hockey matches.

The first match in a newly formed South London Grice Hockey League was played on 12 April 1959 where Streatham Exiles drew with Tooting Bec Lions in a one-all draw.

Following the closure of Sports Stadium Brighton ice rink c. 1965 the Grice Hockey became popular in Brighton on the south coast with the setting down of pitches in several local parks.

== Game ==
The game was variant of Ice Hockey but played on grass, with a ball rather than a puck, and based on Ice Hockey rules.

== References and further reading ==
=== Sources ===
- Burns, Dave (26 March 1970). "Grice Hockey". Acton Gazette. London.
- Curator (2021). "Category:SS Brighton". Brighton Toy Museum.
- Exiles (1 November 1957). "Grice hockey". Norwood News. London.
- Fitch, Geoff (Winter 2020). "Fond Memories of Glynde" (PDF). Steadfast News. Brighton: Steadfast Association.
- Furnish, Don (1961). "The Grice Hockey News Annual 1961 Season".
- League (19 April 1959). "Grice hockey makes its bow". Norwood News. London.
- Webb, David D. (2015). A Quest for Leadership. Barnes and Noble. ISBN 978-1-5035-6037-6 – via googlebooks.
