= Brighton, Lorain County, Ohio =

Unincorporated community in Ohio, U.S.

Coordinates: 41°10′15″N 82°18′32″W

Brighton is an unincorporated community in Lorain County, in the U.S. state of Ohio.

== History ==
Some say the community was so named on account of it being a "bright spot", while others believe the name is a transfer from Brighton, New York, the native home of a share of the first settlers. A post office called Brighton was established in 1825, and remained in operation until 1904. The first country store at Brighton opened in around 1839.
