= HMS Brighton =

Four ships of the Royal Navy have been named HMS Brighton, after the seaside town of Brighton.

- HMS Brighton (1795) was a 14-gun tender purchased in 1795 and captured by the French in 1797.
- HMS Brighton (1903), a passenger ferry requisitioned from the London, Brighton and South Coast Railway in 1914, used as a troopship and later as a hospital ship.
- HMS Brighton (I08) was a Town-class destroyer during the Second World War
- HMS Brighton (F106) was a Rothesay-class frigate launched in 1959 and scrapped in 1985.
