= New Brighton State Beach =

State beach in Santa Cruz County, California, United States

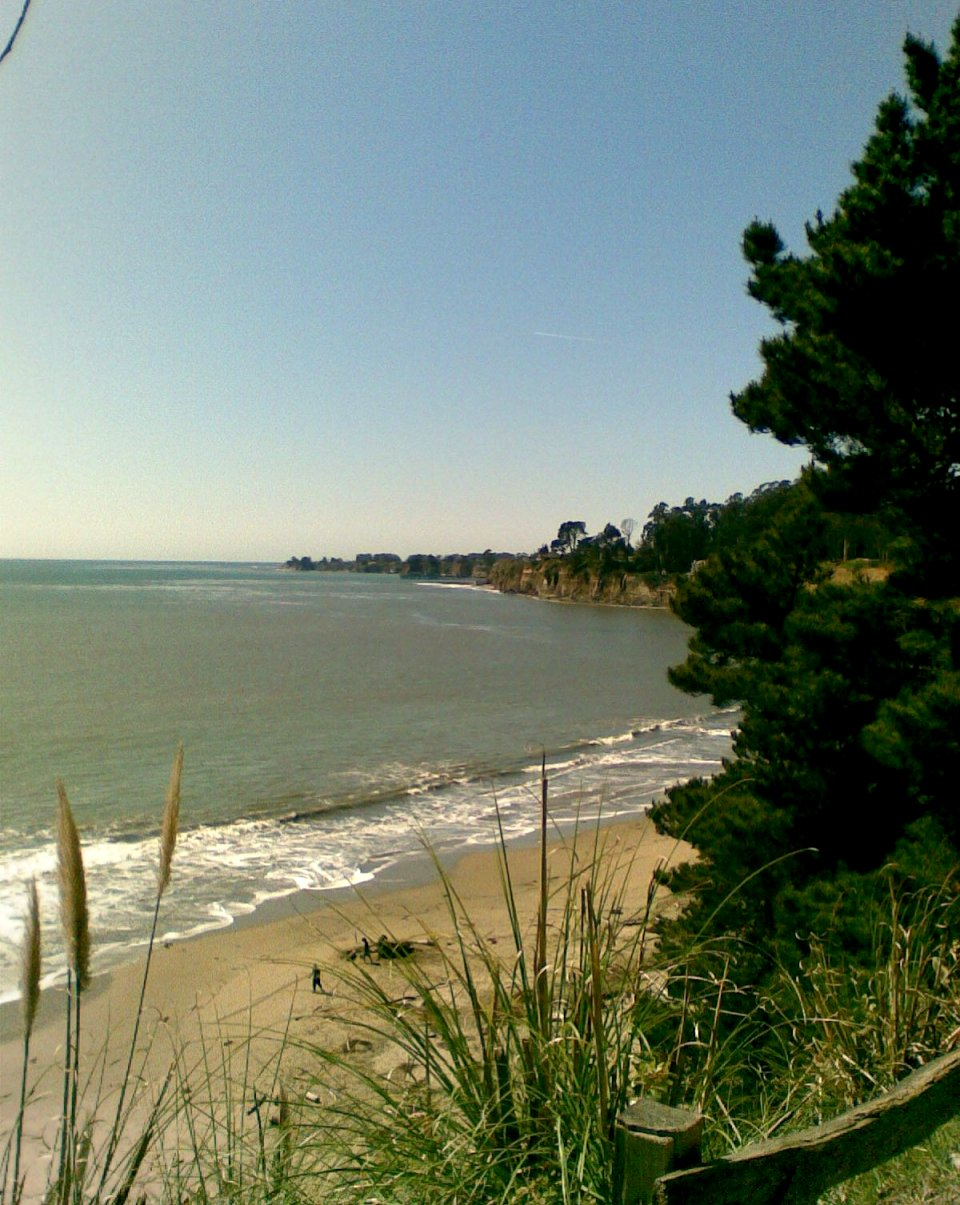

- Location within California Location within the United States
- Location: Santa Cruz County, California
- Nearest city: Capitola
- Coordinates: 36°58′42″N 121°56′15″W
- Governing body: California Department of Parks and Recreation

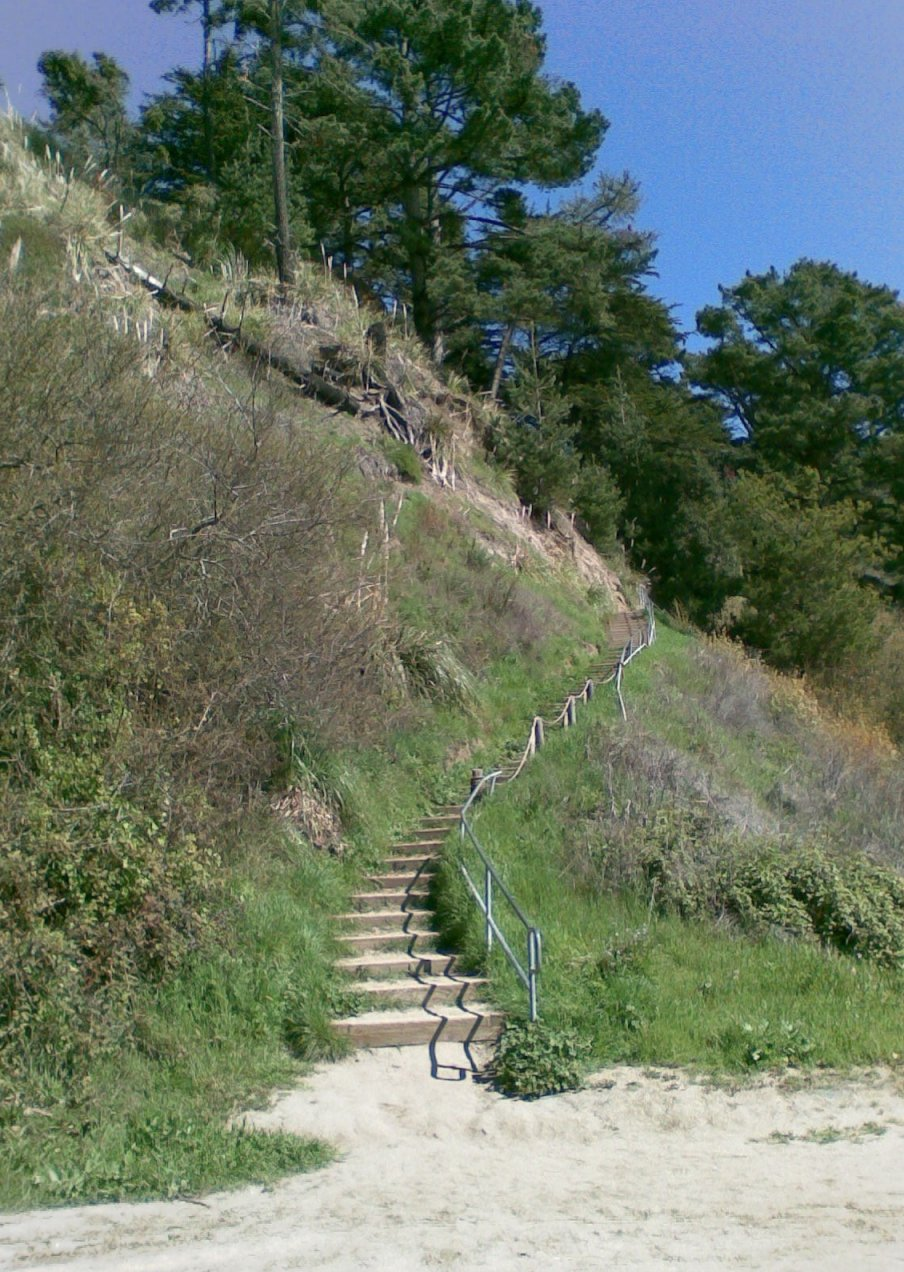
Stairs to campgrounds

New Brighton State Beach is a 95 acres (38 ha) beach park on Monterey Bay in Santa Cruz County, California, consisting of a beach and campgrounds. The park is located east of Santa Cruz in Capitola, on Park Avenue off Highway 1. The park is adjacent to Seacliff State Beach, which is known for its fishing pier and sunk concrete freighter, The Palo Alto. The beach overlooks Soquel Cove and Monterey Bay.

== History ==
This cove was originally called China Beach after the Chinese fishermen that settled the region in the 1850s. These residents were vital to the construction of the California railroad and provided labor and food to the Santa Cruz region. By the 1870s, fisherman of other ethnicities began to enter the region, forcing out many of the Chinese residents. The Chinese Exclusion Act of 1882 contributed to the demise of the village and by 1900, the village no longer existed and few remnants of its existence remained.

During the late 1870s, Thomas Fallon began development of a small resort east of China Beach. Fallon was an immigrant from Ireland and the ex-mayor of San Jose (1859–1863). He named his campground Camp San Jose in the hopes of attracting tourists from San Jose. However, the name did not do as he had hoped and in 1882 Fallon renamed the campground New Brighton.

In 1933, the state of California purchased the land where China Beach had previously been with the intention of converting the land into a state park. After its purchase, the land remained unnamed for many years, but was eventually named New Brighton State Park by the Director of State Parks.

== Wildlife ==
The rocky shores of New Brighton Park are home to many wildlife inhabitants such as mussels, sea stars, barnacles, rock crabs, sea anemones, and ocean worms. Fish populations around the pier include flounder, sole, halibut, mackerel, lingcod, jacksmelt, cabezon, anchovy, perch, kingfish, steelhead, and salmon. Other animals that inhabit the park include pelicans, dolphins, sea otters, sea lions, sharks, and migrating whales. In the summer and early fall, a species of seabirds called sooty shearwaters migrate north by the thousands from southern regions as far away as New Zealand. These birds fly over the ocean in figure eights as they hunt for anchovies.

Tall grasses and scrubby vegetation grow along the beach. The park is surrounded by oak trees, Monterey cypress trees, eucalyptus trees, and soaring pine trees. Wild berry vines surround the campsites of the park.

== Weather ==
New Brighton Park is located in the coastal region of Santa Cruz County where the annual average high is 69 °F (21 °C) and the annual average low is 45 °F (7 °C). The average amount of rainfall this region receives in a year is 29.0 inches (740 mm).

== Facilities ==
New Brighton Park has a visitor center containing exhibits and educational programs about various wildlife. Other facilities at the park include restrooms, showers, lifeguards, picnic areas, fire pits, and a dump station. The park also contains over one hundred tent and RV campsites.
