= Brighton, Clark County, Ohio =

Unincorporated community in Ohio, U.S.

Coordinates: 39°55′48″N 83°33′41″W

Brighton is an unincorporated community in Harmony Township, Clark County, Ohio, US.

== History ==
Brighton was laid out in 1835. A post office called Brighton Centre was established in 1835, and remained in operation until 1843. A post office was later reestablished there under the name Orchard. The Orchard post office opened in 1890, and was discontinued in 1909.
