= Brighton School (Toronto) =

Location
- 150 Wynford Drive; Toronto, Ontario, M3C 1K6; Canada; 43.73920°N 79.34738°W

Information
- School type: Private, special education
- Founded: 2003
- Educational authority: Ontario Ministry of Education
- Principal: Irene McRae
- Head of high school programs: Marianne Hitz
- Executive director: Kathy Lear

Brighton School (Toronto) is a private all-grade school in Toronto, Ontario, Canada, providing small classes for students with learning challenges. Inspected by the Ontario Ministry of Education, the school's curriculum offers credits toward the Ontario Secondary School Diploma, and it is a member of the Ontario Federation of Independent Schools.

== History ==
It's about ensuring students are able to take care of themselves with self-advocacy, financial literacy and nutrition skills, so they can be more independent when they leave. We want them to be able to make friends and have as full a life as possible.

— Marianne Hitz,
Head of high school programs

Brighton School was founded in 2003 to offer special education classes. In 2018, its enrollment was 70 students, elementary through high school. The National Post reported, "Many of Brighton's students attend for a period of remedial learning before returning to their school of choice. For teens not in a position to move on to another high school, Brighton provides necessary life skills and real-world preparation so that they are able to enter the workplace, community college or a vocational program."

In 2019, the average annual tuition cost was CAD$24,225.

=== Brighton Launch adult program ===
In 2015, Brighton School created the Brighton Launch adult program for "students over the age of 18 who had finished high school yet needed more hands-on life experience", according to the National Post. According to Executive Director Kathy Lear, Brighton Launch offers a unique curriculum, "transitions to adulthood skills", which emphasizes career development, workplace, life skills, and community. The program provides practical day classes, work placements, and an internal work experience producing bath bombs, lip balm and lotions which participants sell on Etsy and at craft shows. Brighton Launch also sponsors Friday night socials for students aged 13 and over.
