= SS Palo Alto =

1919 American concrete ship

Coordinates: 36°58′10.75″N 121°54′50.31″W

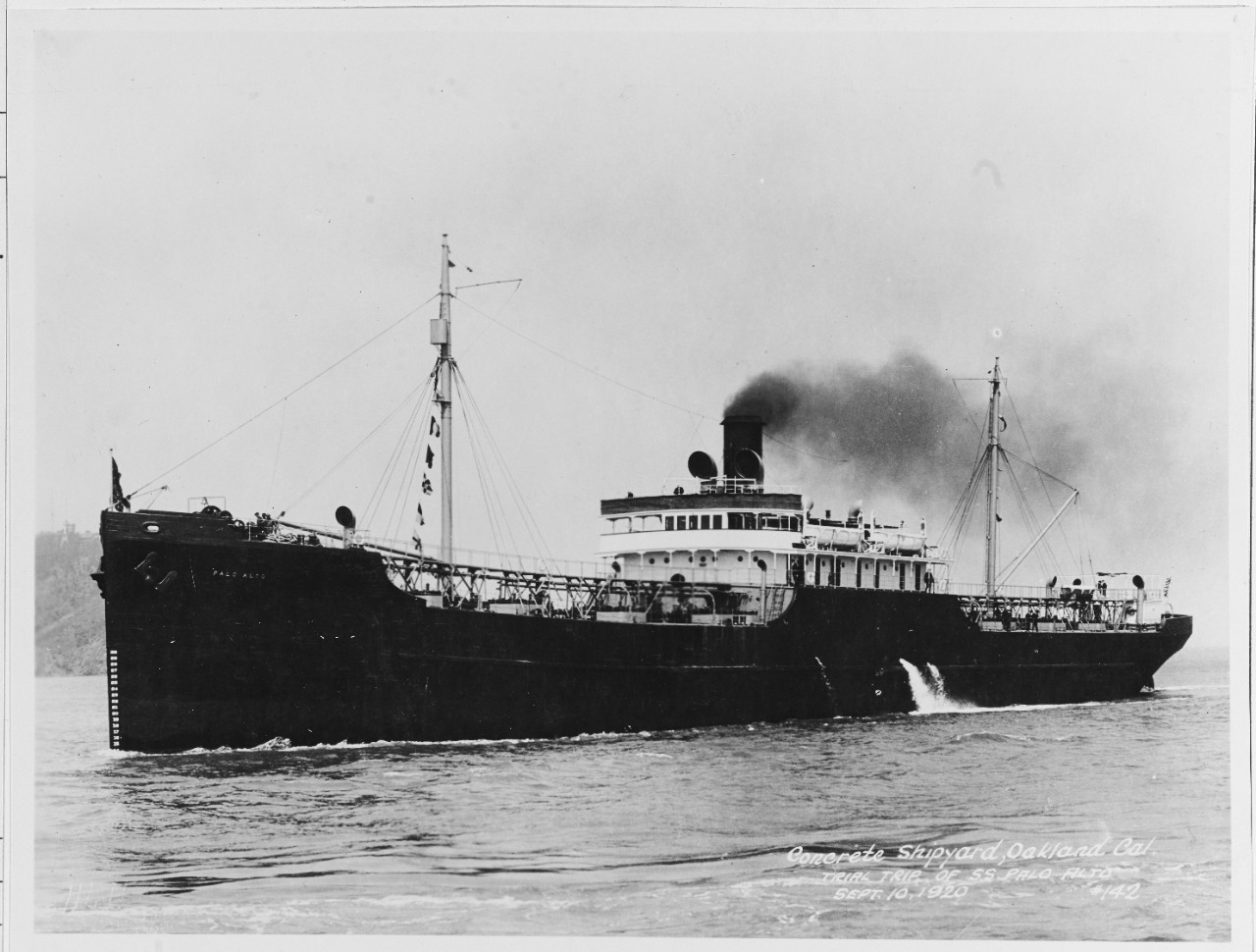
- Palo Alto on sea trials, September 10, 1920

History

United States
- Name: SS Palo Alto
- Namesake: Palo Alto, California
- Owner: USSB (1919–Nov. 26, 1924); Oliver J. Olson & Co. (Nov. 26, 1924–); R.C. Porter (–1929); Seacliff Amusement Co. (1929–1932); Calavada Investment Co. (Note: Seacliff Amusement Corporation is sometimes conflated with Calavada, and misidentified as Cal-Neva or Cal-Nevada.) (1932–); Arthur H. Wikkerink and Walter F. Pilgrim (–Feb. 12, 1936); California (Feb. 12, 1936–present)
- Builder: San Francisco Shipbuilding Company, Oakland, California
- Cost: $1,794,804.19 ($32.4 million in 2025)
- Launched: May 29, 1919
- Home port: San Francisco, California
- Identification: Hull number 1663; Official number 220566; Code letters MBVJ
- Fate: Grounded as a fishing pier at Seacliff Beach

General characteristics
- Type: Design 1100 concrete tanker
- Tonnage: 6,144 GRT; 3,696 NRT; 7,500 DWT
- Length: 420 ft 0 in (128.02 m) (p/p); 434 ft 3 in (132.36 m) (o/a)
- Beam: 54.0 ft (16.5 m)
- Draft: 26.0 ft (7.9 m)
- Depth: 35.0 ft (10.7 m)
- Decks: One
- Installed power: Three Foster boilers fueled by an oil bunker of 278,655 US gal (1,054,820 L; 232,029 imp gal) capacity
- Propulsion: Llewellyn Iron Works three-cylinder triple-expansion steam engine; 359 nhp; 2,800 ihp (2,100 kW)
- Speed: 10.5–11 kn (19.4–20.4 km/h; 12.1–12.7 mph)
- Range: 7,000 mi (11,000 km) cruising radius
- Capacity: 2,477,000 US gal (9,380,000 L; 2,063,000 imp gal)
- Crew: 40

SS Palo Alto, colloquially known as the Cement Ship, was a concrete ship built as a tanker at the end of World War I. Completed too late to see war service, she was mothballed until 1929, when she was intentionally grounded off Seacliff State Beach in the Monterey Bay, becoming part of a pleasure pier entertainment complex. Palo Alto was damaged by the sea, leading her to be stripped and used only as a fishing pier. Subsequent decades have seen her be further broken by the sea, but large sections of her wreck remain partially intact. She is the sister ship to the SS Peralta.

== History ==
SS Palo Alto was built by the San Francisco Shipbuilding Company at Government Island in Oakland, California as part of the World War I Emergency Fleet. After the armistice, any Emergency Fleet ships not already nearing completion were canceled, making the Palo Alto one of only twelve concrete ships to have her work continued. Pouring of her larsite (a type of expanded clay aggregate) (Note: A type of light-aggregate clay concrete named after its inventor, Gus Larson.) concrete hull began on January 20, 1919. The ship was launched sideways on May 29, 1919, she underwent trials on September 10, 1919, and was delivered that same month. She received her documents on October 23, 1920. She was the first concrete tanker, and the largest concrete ship yet built at the time.

The Shipping Board put the Palo Alto up for sale while still under construction. Various claims have been made as to the results of the sale offer, (Note: She was reported as bid on, chartered, owned, sold, and controlled or owned.) but she remained in mothballs in the Board's possession in San Francisco until November 26, 1924, when the Shipping Board finally sold her as scrap to Oliver J. Olson & Company for $18,750. ($352,245 in 2025). Her documents were subsequently surrendered on June 30, 1926. Her hulk was later purchased by the Seacliff Amusement Company and towed to what would become Seacliff State Beach in Aptos, California, starting the journey at 4 p.m. January 21, 1930, and arriving at 7 a.m. the next day. Once in position on the 25th, she was scuttled in shallow water near the shore.

Settled on the ocean floor, she was refitted as an amusement ship, with amenities including a dance floor, a swimming pool and a café and had the pier built out to connect the shore to her. The opening event was held in her ballroom on June 21, 1930, and "The Ship" (Note: A name by which it would continue to be known for some time, and eventually becoming the "Cement Ship".) opened publicly on June 28. In 1932, as a result of the Great Depression, the Seacliff Amusement Company defaulted on its loans and the ship passed to its creditor, Calavada Investment Company. The ship cracked at the midsection during a winter storm later that year. In 1934, H.R. Lord purchased salvage rights to the Palo Alto from Calavada, dismantling and selling most everything of value. As part of its efforts in establishing Seacliff State Beach park, California purchased the ship for $1 in 1936, and she became a fishing pier.

She was a popular site for recreational fishing, but her deterioration led to further troubles. Her foredeck was closed for being unsafe in 1958, and her masts were cut down in 1959. A 1963 storm split the hull along the 1932 crack, and a January 1978 storm caused parts of her to start listing. A demolition effort was considered in 1978, and after a 1980 storm damaged the pier the ship was closed to the public. A 1983 grassroots repair effort led to the ship reopening again on July 23, 1983; ongoing deteriorating led to the ship closing again for a time in 1986.

The Palo Alto is artificial reef for marine life. Pelicans and other seabirds perch on the wreck, sea perch and other fish feed on algae, sea lions and other marine mammals feed on the fish. In the mid-2000s, however, an oil spill that had been deadly to dozens of seabirds was traced back to the ship; her fuel tanks had cracked were leading fuel oil. In September 2006, a cleanup project was started that cost $1.8 million ($2.69 million in 2025). Workers pumped 500 US gal (1,900 L; 420 imp gal) of oil from the ship and discovered the carcasses of 200 birds and two harbor seals inside.

The ship began to roll more severely to the starboard in early 2016, and the entire ship (plus parts of the pier) were closed to the public once again in the summer of 2016. On January 21, 2017, another winter storm tore the stern off the ship. On January 5, 2023, another winter storm destroyed portions of the pier leading to the ship, leading the state to begin removal of the pier altogether in March 20, 2023. This work was completed in May.

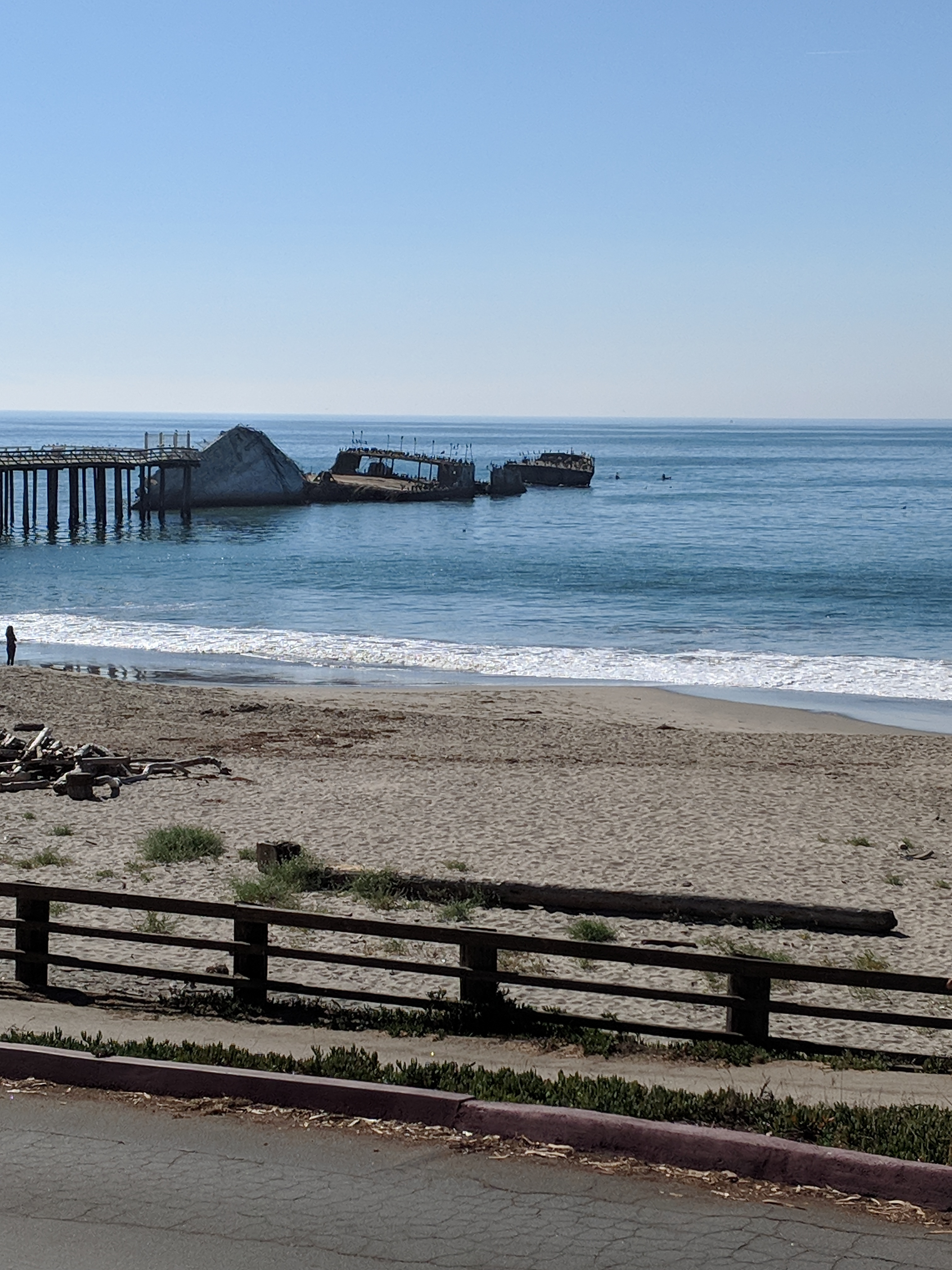
The Palo Alto in 2018

== Gallery ==
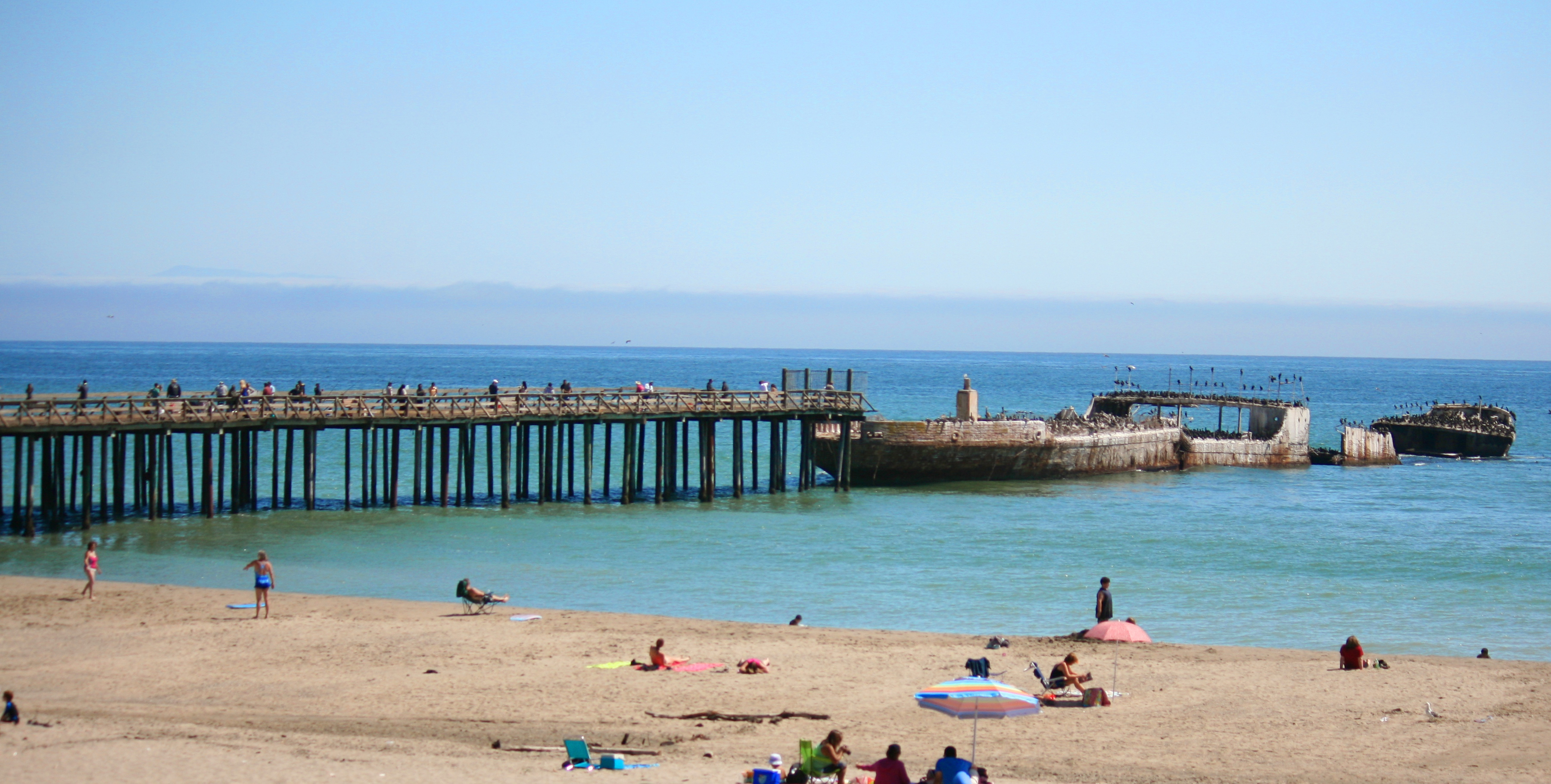
SS Palo Alto in July 2012 when she was still largely congruent on one axis

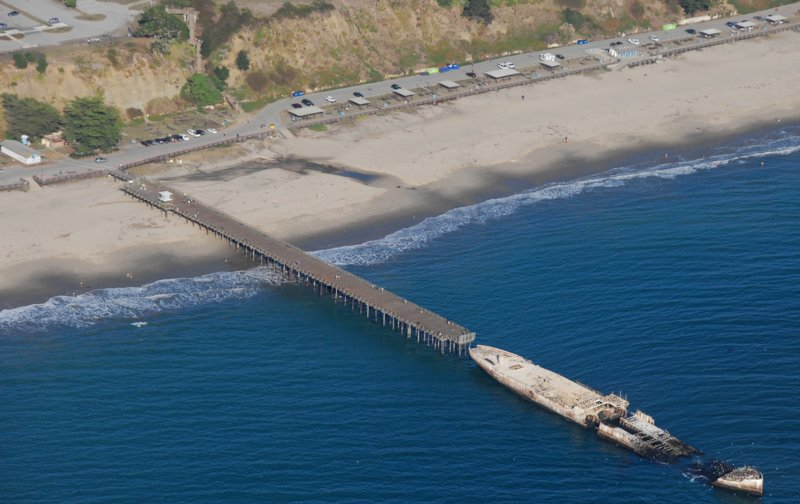
An aerial view in 2013

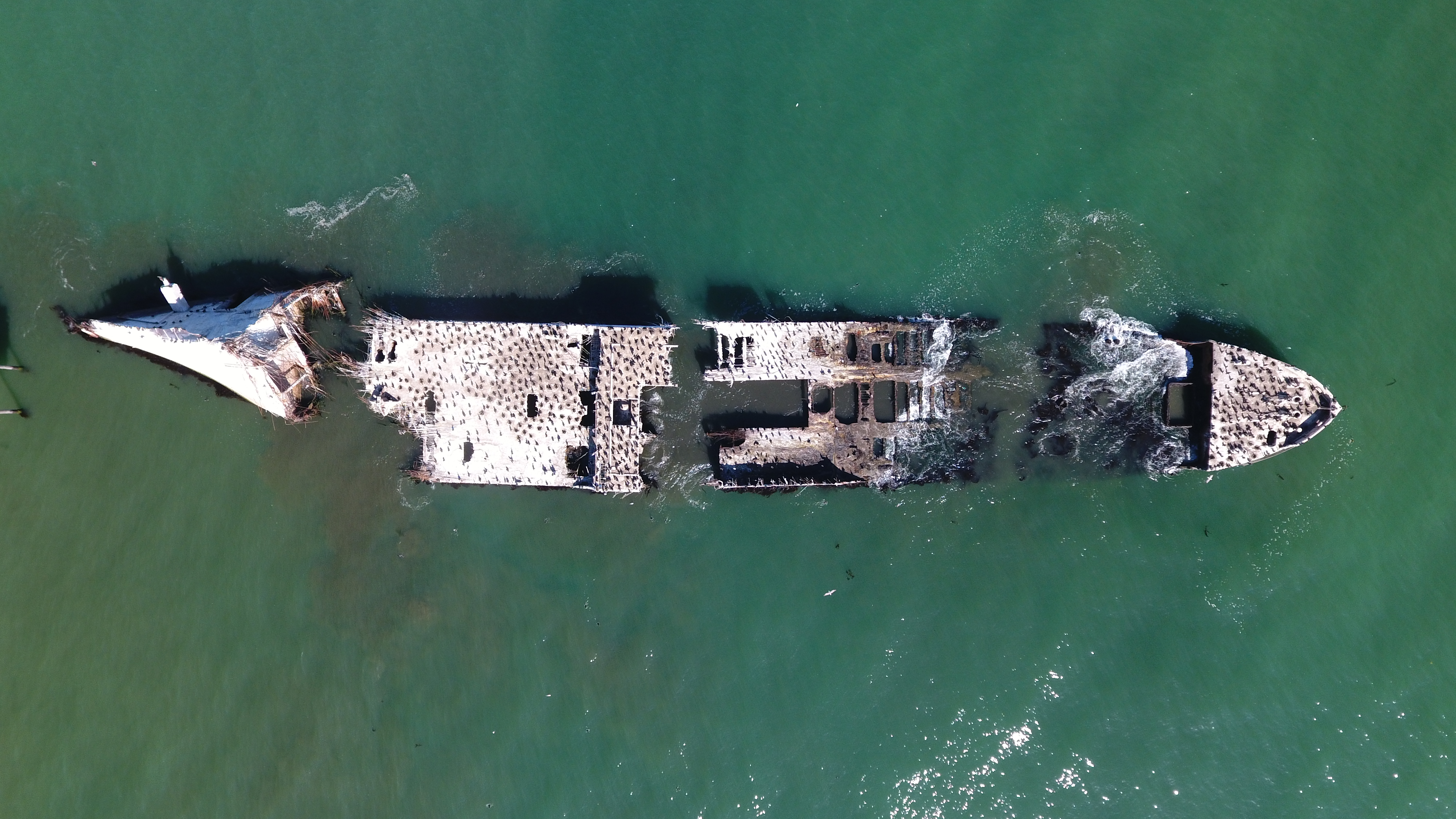
Direct overhead view in July 2019, the stern wholly detached

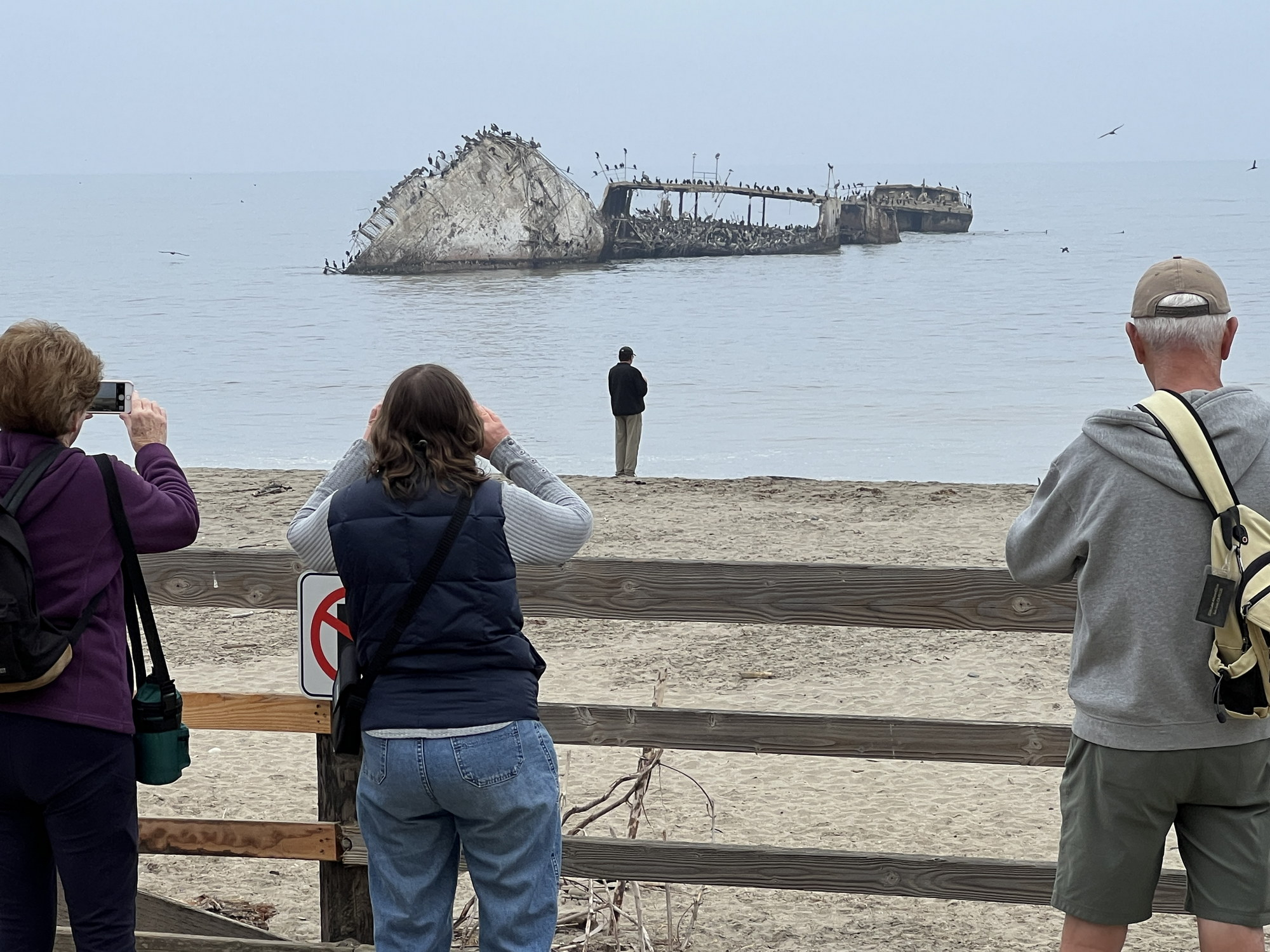
After the pier's removal following the 2022–2023 California floods, her stern askew

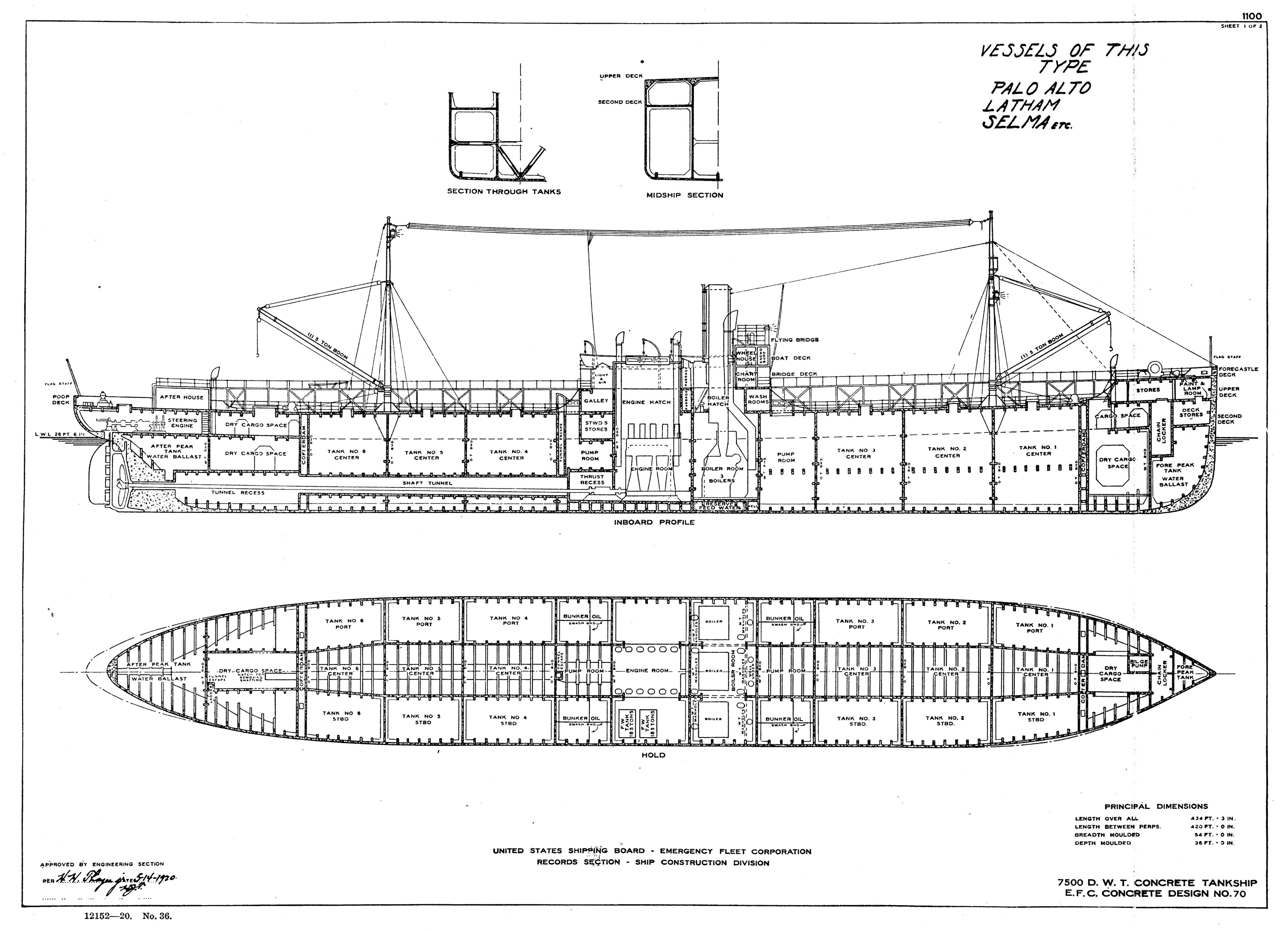
Design 1100 inboard profile and hold plans

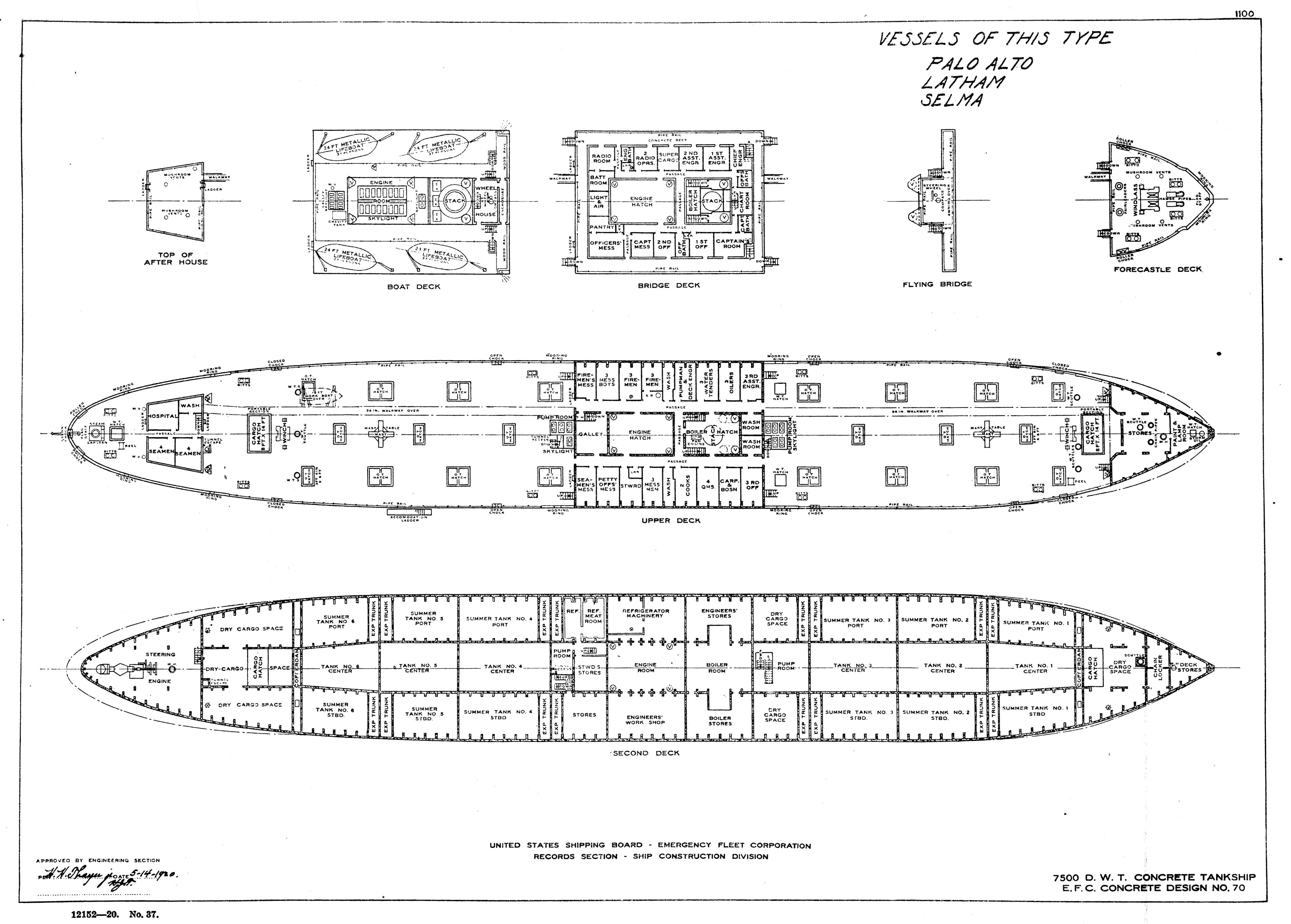
Design 1100 deck plans
