= Brighton Township =

Brighton Township may refer to:

- Brighton Township, Macoupin County, Illinois
- Brighton Township, Washington County, Iowa
- Brighton Township, Michigan
- Brighton Township, Nicollet County, Minnesota
- Brighton Township, Ohio
- Brighton Township, Beaver County, Pennsylvania
