= Brighton, Georgia =

Unincorporated community in Georgia, U.S.

Coordinates: 31°30′10″N 83°27′22″W

Brighton is an unincorporated community in Tift County, in the U.S. state of Georgia.

== History ==
A post office was in operation at Brighton from 1900 until 1905. According to tradition, the community was named after a place of the same name in Connecticut.
