= Brighton International University =

University in Dakar, Senegal

Brighton International University - School of Medicine is an institution with final authorization delivered by the Ministry of Education of the Republic of Senegal. BIU is the first University and the first School of Medicine to operate south of the capital of the country, Dakar, in the region of Casamance. There is at least an administrative office in Boca Raton, Florida (United States of America).

It offers the courses: Doctor of Medicine, M.D. (Six Years + Theses), Bachelor of Medicine, Bachelor of Surgery, M.B.B.S., Doctor of Dental Medicine, D.M.D. (Four Years), Doctor of Veterinary Medicine, D.V.M. (Five Years), Bachelor of Science in Nursing, B.S.N. (High-school diploma + Four Years) and Bachelor of Biomedical Sciences, B.Sc. (Four Years).
