= SS Brighton (1903) =

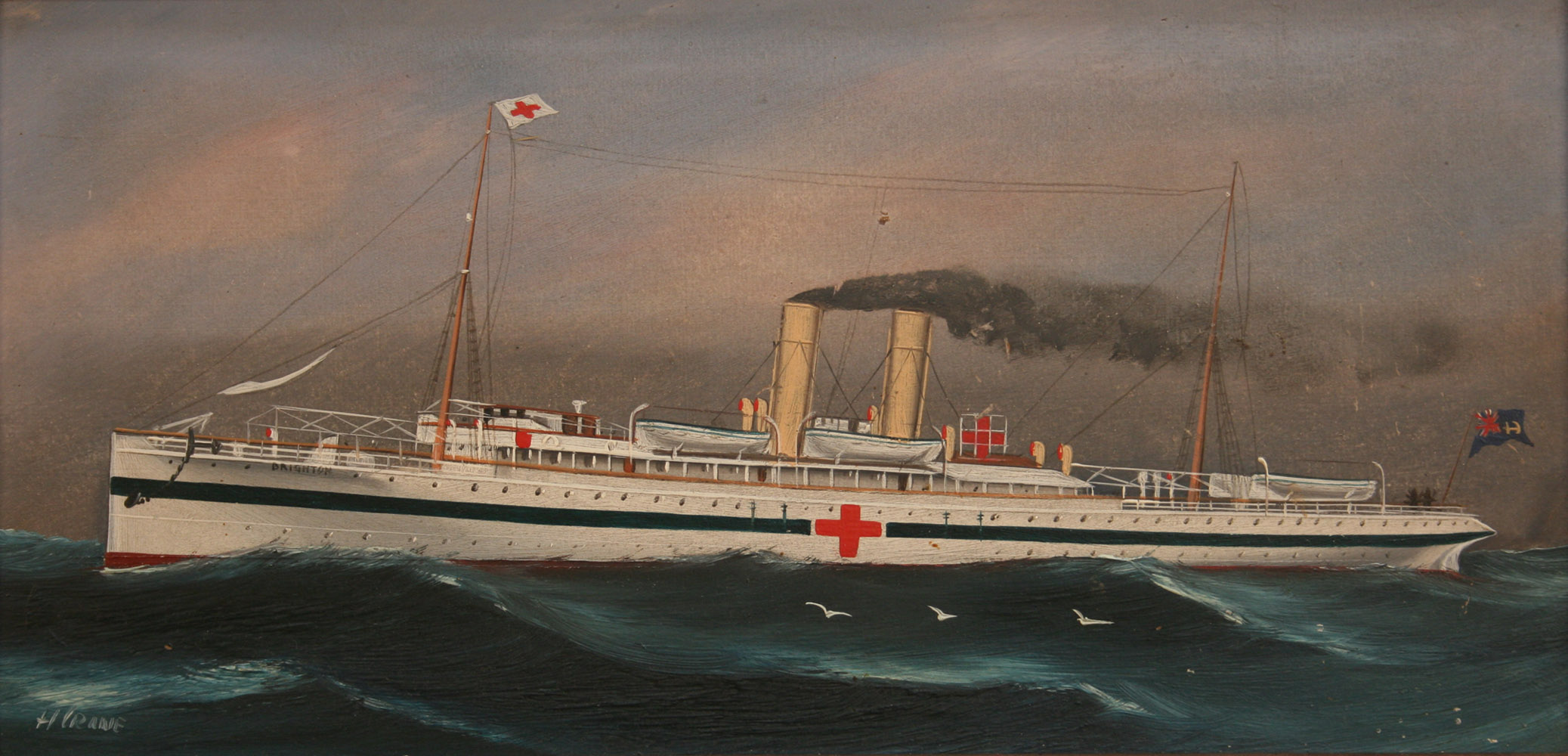
- HMHS Brighton (1903)

History

United Kingdom
- Name: SS Brighton (1903–14); HMS Brighton (1914- ); HMHS Brighton ( -1920); SS Brighton (1920–30); SY Roussalka (1930–31); MY Roussalka (1931–33)
- Owner: London, Brighton and South Coast Railway (1903–14); Royal Navy (1914–20); London, Brighton and South Coast Railway (1920–22); Southern Railway (1923–30); W E Guinness (1930–33)
- Port of registry: (United Kingdom) Newhaven(1903-14); (United Kingdom) Royal Navy (1914–20); (United Kingdom) Newhaven(1920-30); (United Kingdom) Cowes (1930–33)
- Route: Newhaven - Dieppe (1903-14, 1920–30)
- Builder: W Denny & Bros, Dumbarton
- Yard number: 683
- Launched: 13 June 1903
- Completed: August 1903
- Out of service: 25 August 1933
- Identification: United Kingdom Official Number 105654; Code Letters VDWN
- Fate: Wrecked

General characteristics
- Tonnage: 1,384 GRT; 729 NRT
- Length: 273 ft 6 in (83.36 m)
- Beam: 34 ft 2 in (10.41 m)
- Depth: 14 ft 1 in (4.29 m)
- Installed power: 3 × steam turbines (1903–31); 2 × diesel engines (1931–33)
- Propulsion: Triple screws (1903–31); Single screw (1931–33)
- Speed: 21 knots (39 km/h) (1903–31); 15.5 knots (28.7 km/h) (1931–33)

Brighton was a 1,384 GRT steamship which was built in 1903 for the London, Brighton and South Coast Railway and London and South Western Railway. She passed to the Southern Railway on 1 January 1923. In 1930, she was sold to W E Guinness and converted to a private yacht, Roussalka (named after Slavonic mythologic creature). She was wrecked at Killary Bay on 25 August 1933.In June 2024, members of the Athlone Sub Aqua Club rediscovered the remains of the wreck.It had been found in the 1970s but its position was lost. The Sub Aqua team is logging and filming the wreck for historical interest.

== Description ==
The ship was built by W Denny & Bros, Dumbarton. She was yard number 683 and was launched on 13 June 1903 with completion in August 1903. The ship was 273 feet 6 inches (83.36 m) long, with a beam of 34 feet 2 inches (10.41 m) and a depth of 14 feet 1 inch (4.29 m). She was powered by three steam turbines, which were made by Parsons Steam Turbine Co Ltd, Newcastle upon Tyne. The turbines were rated at 580 horsepower (430 kW) and drove three screws. These could propel her at a speed of 21 knots (39 km/h). In 1931, Roussalka was fitted with two 8-cylinder Atlas diesel engines of 1,750 horsepower (1,300 kW) driving a single screw, giving her a speed of 15.5 knots (28.7 km/h).

== History ==
Brighton was built for the London, Brighton and South Coast Railway. She was used on their Newhaven - Dieppe route. She was to have been the first turbine powered steamship built for the LB&SCR but a fire at the shipbuilders delayed her completion, pushing her into second place. Her port of registry was Newhaven.

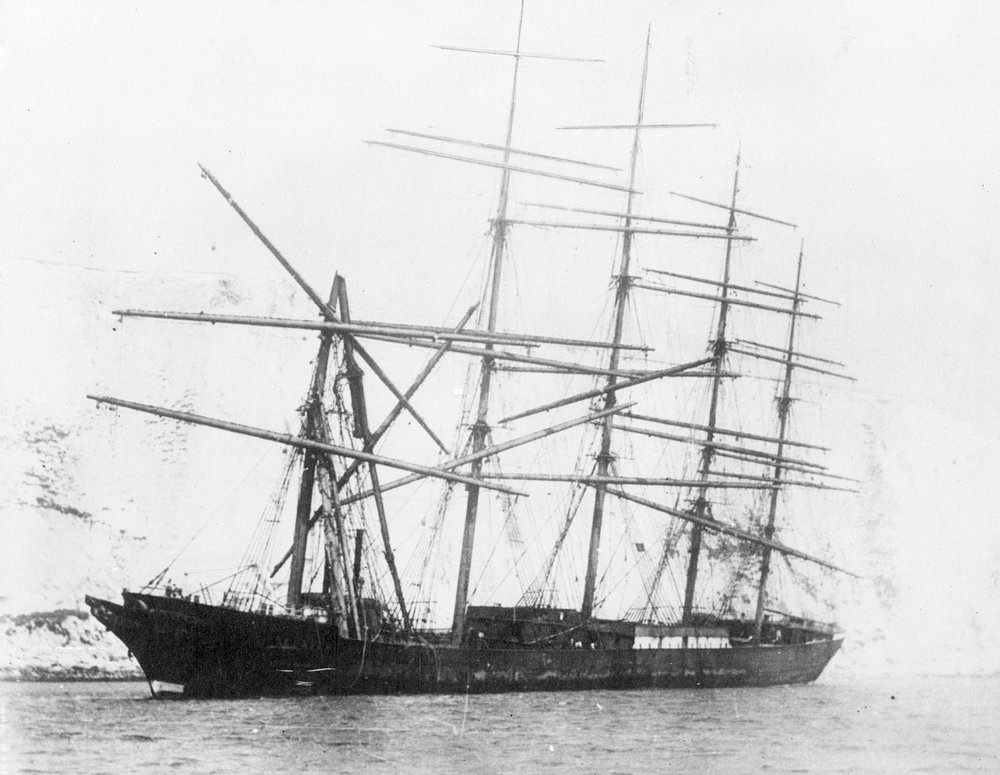
Wreck of the Preußen

On 5 November 1910 Brighton was involved in a collision with the windjammer Preußen 8 nautical miles (15 km) south of Newhaven. Brighton returned to Newhaven to summon aid, and the tug Alert was sent to assist Preußen, which was towed towards Dover. It was intended to anchor her off Dover but both anchor chains broke and Preußen was driven onto rocks where she sank as a result of the damage inflicted to her. The master of Brighton was found to be responsible for the accident and lost his licence as a result. He later committed suicide by shooting himself in a London pub.

In 1914, Brighton was requisitioned by the Royal Navy for use as a troopship. She was later used as a hospital ship. On 19 December 1914, she rescued the survivors of the naval trawler HMT Orianda, which had been sunk by a mine in the North Sea off Scarborough, Yorkshire. Brighton brought the American President Woodrow Wilson back to Dover after the signing of the Treaty of Versailles. Brighton was returned to her owners in 1920. Brighton passed to the Southern Railway at Grouping. In 1930, Brighton was sold to W E Guinness, who converted her to a private yacht named Roussalka. Her steam turbines were replaced by a diesel engine and one of her two funnels was removed. She was renamed Roussalka. On 25 August 1933, in thick fog, Roussalka was wrecked on Blood Slate Rock, Freaklin Island, Killary Bay, Ireland. All passengers and crew were rescued.

== Official Number and code letters ==
Official Numbers were a forerunner to IMO Numbers. Brighton had the United Kingdom Official Number 105654 and used the Code Letters VDWN.

== See also ==
- Rusalka
