= Brighton, Shelburne, Nova Scotia =

Community in Nova Scotia, Canada

Coordinates: 43°42′8.69″N 65°7′23.9″W

Brighton in Nova Scotia

Brighton is a community of the Municipality of the District of Shelburne in the Canadian province of Nova Scotia. It is located near the town of Lockeport.
