= Brighton Secondary College =

Location
- 120 Marriage Road; Brighton East, Victoria; Australia; 37°55′15″S 145°1′7″E

Information
- Type: State, secular co-educational
- Motto: A tradition of Excellence
- Established: 1955
- Principal: Peter Langham
- Grades: 7–12
- Enrolment: >1,200
- Colours: Green, purple, grey, white
- Newspaper: Highlights
- Yearbook: Voyager
- Website: Brighton Secondary College

Brighton Secondary College is a co-educational public secondary school for students in Years 7 to 12, located in Brighton East, within the City of Bayside, Melbourne, Victoria, Australia. Established in 1955, the school was previously known as Brighton High School until 1988. Today, it has an enrolment of over 1,200 students.

Brighton Secondary College features a blend of mid-century and contemporary architecture. The Da Vinci Centre, completed in the 2010s, exemplifies the school’s architectural renewal. Designed by Hayball Architects, it houses science, art, and technology facilities, and received the 2015 CEFPI Award for Most Outstanding New Individual Facility. The campus also includes a purpose-built VCE Centre for senior students. As part of its future vision, Brighton plans to construct a new Performing Arts Hub to serve both students and the wider Bayside community, with a focus on accessibility, sustainability, and inclusive design.

The SEAL (Select Entry Accelerated Learning) program is designed for academically gifted students, offering an enriched and fast-tracked curriculum. It allows students to complete Years 7–10 in three years, providing early access to VCE subjects and deeper learning opportunities. SEAL fosters independent thinking, advanced problem-solving, and academic confidence. Entry is competitive, based on testing and interviews. Students benefit from a stimulating environment that nurtures excellence, leadership, and a strong foundation for tertiary education and lifelong learning.

The college has an instrumental music program and language program, including French and Japanese. Optional courses at the year 9 level include those related to the arts (art, drama, media, and music) and those related to technology (digital imagery, food studies, robotics, textiles, visual communication design, and woodwork). Students are offered an introduction to International Baccalaureate Diploma Program (IB) which is offered in grade 11 and 12 as an alternative to the VCE.'

Years 11 and 12 offer a much broader range of subjects including those related to STEM subjects (Science, Technology, Engineering, and Mathematics), the humanities, business related subjects, and other subjects such as Product Design and Technology, Visual Communication and Design, Outdoor and Environmental Studies, Legal Studies, Health and Human Development, and Australian & Global Politics. Students are offered the opportunity to complete VET (Vocational Education & Training) subjects.

== Leadership ==
This school became the first co-educational institution in Victoria with more than a thousand students to be led by a woman, Molly Brennan, in 1970. Today, the library is named in her honor.

In January 2025, Peter Langham was appointed principal. Langham, formerly principal of Monterey Secondary College, is known for his trauma-informed leadership and success in transforming school culture. Under his direction, Brighton Secondary College has prioritised respectful relationships, student voice, inclusive teaching practices, and community engagement. The school’s Annual Implementation Plan emphasises a safe and orderly learning environment, high-impact teaching strategies, and stronger support systems for student wellbeing. These reforms mark a significant effort to rebuild trust and foster a more inclusive and positive school culture.

== Television ==
During the 2006–2007 school year, Brighton Secondary College served as the filming location for the television series Summer Heights High which concluded production on 2 February 2007.

== Controversies ==
In 2019, Principal Richard Minack sparked controversy after using racial slurs during a school assembly held in response to the Christchurch mosque attacks. Addressing the student body, Minack referenced offensive language in an attempt to highlight the history and impact of racism. He later clarified his intent, stating, “I hope you understand that I used it to call out and criticise racism and bigotry.” Despite his explanation, the incident drew criticism from students, parents, and education officials, with concerns raised about the appropriateness of using such language in a school setting. The Department of Education acknowledged the issue and advised the principal to use more appropriate language in future communications.

=== Antisemitic bullying allegations ===
Brighton Secondary College was the subject of a Federal Court case following allegations of antisemitic bullying spanning several years. In 2020, a former student alleged that after enrolling in 2013, he experienced repeated verbal and physical abuse, including antisemitic slurs, assaults, and threats involving a knife. He claimed that despite reporting the incidents multiple times, the school failed to take action.

In 2022, five former students filed a lawsuit against the school, Principal Richard Minack, and two former teachers, alleging years of antisemitic bullying, discrimination, and negligence. The Federal Court found that the school had breached the Racial Discrimination Act and awarded $435,000 in damages. Following the ruling, Principal Richard Minack resigned in October 2023. Leisa Higgins served as acting principal during the transition.

In 2024, due to a lack of appointment being made for Principal, Anne Stout from Port Melbourne Secondary College served as an executive interim principal before Peter Langham was appointed.

== See also ==
- List of schools in Victoria
- List of high schools in Victoria
