= Sports Stadium Brighton =

Former sports arena in Brighton, England

- Address: Brighton; England

Construction
- Built: 1934
- Demolished: 1965

Sports Stadium Brighton or S. S. Brighton was a former venue at Brighton initially being a swimming pool and subsequently an ice-rink. It was also known as Brighton Sports Stadium for much of its existence.

== History ==
Sports Stadium Brighton opened as a swimming pool in 1934. After initial success but a subsequent decline in patronage it was to be repurposed as an ice-rink and rebranded Brighton Sports Stadium in October 1935. It was also rebranded The Brighton Palladium. (Note: Not to be confused with similarly named Brighton Palladium Theatre.) It closed and was demolished c. 1965.

As an ice-rink the venue was home to the Brighton Tigers ice hockey team. With the closure of the ice-rink there was surge in popularity of Grice hockey, a grass game based on ice hockey in the area.
