= San Lorenzo Valley Museum =

- Established: March 1976; 50 years ago
- Location: Boulder Creek, California; Felton, California
- Coordinates: 37°7′0″N 122°7′11″W
- Directors: Lisa Robinson, President of Board of Directors
- Website: www.slvmuseum.org

The San Lorenzo Valley Museum is a pair of galleries and education centers created by the San Lorenzo Valley Historical Society "to preserve and share the history of the San Lorenzo Valley". Founded in March 1976, it operates as a nonprofit educational institution. The Museum's original gallery is located in Boulder Creek. An additional gallery is located in nearby Felton. The Museum's visitors are admitted without charge. Partial funding comes from the California Humanities and the National Endowment for the Humanities (NEH). Other funding comes from private and corporate contributions, membership dues, and earned retail revenue.

== Founding ==
The origin of the San Lorenzo Valley Museum began when Ralph Wilcox, Walt Bachrach, and John Holm met in March 1976 to establish the Boulder Creek Historical Society. They would become the Museum's first Board of Directors.

The Museum proposed a number of undertakings. These included collecting and exhibiting artifacts, gathering historical information, and providing education through the museum and outreach programs. The Museum initially was housed on the second floor of an office building in southern Boulder Creek before relocating to its permanent home in the former Grace Episcopal Church.

== Development ==
When funds were donated to the Boulder Creek Historical Society to purchase a property to hold its collection, it was among the Museum's first major donations from a private individual. Restoration began on the former Grace Episcopal Church building in 1995. The Grace Episcopal Gallery opened in December 1999 and was named the San Lorenzo Valley Museum, broadening its mission and scope. A climate-controlled annex was built beside the building in 2011 to house the Museum's archive and administrative office.

The Boulder Creek Historical Society officially became the San Lorenzo Valley Historical Society in 2012, reflecting the name of the Museum.

The Museum's first expansion came with the availability of the historic Felton Presbyterian Church building in 2018. That same year, the Museum signed an agreement between the Belardi Trust directors and Felton Library Friends to use the building for a second branch. The Faye G. Belardi Memorial Gallery opened in October 2020.

== Galleries ==
Two galleries comprise the San Lorenzo Valley Museum. One is in Boulder Creek and the other in Felton.

=== Grace Episcopal Gallery ===
- Grace Episcopal Church
- U.S. National Register of Historic Places
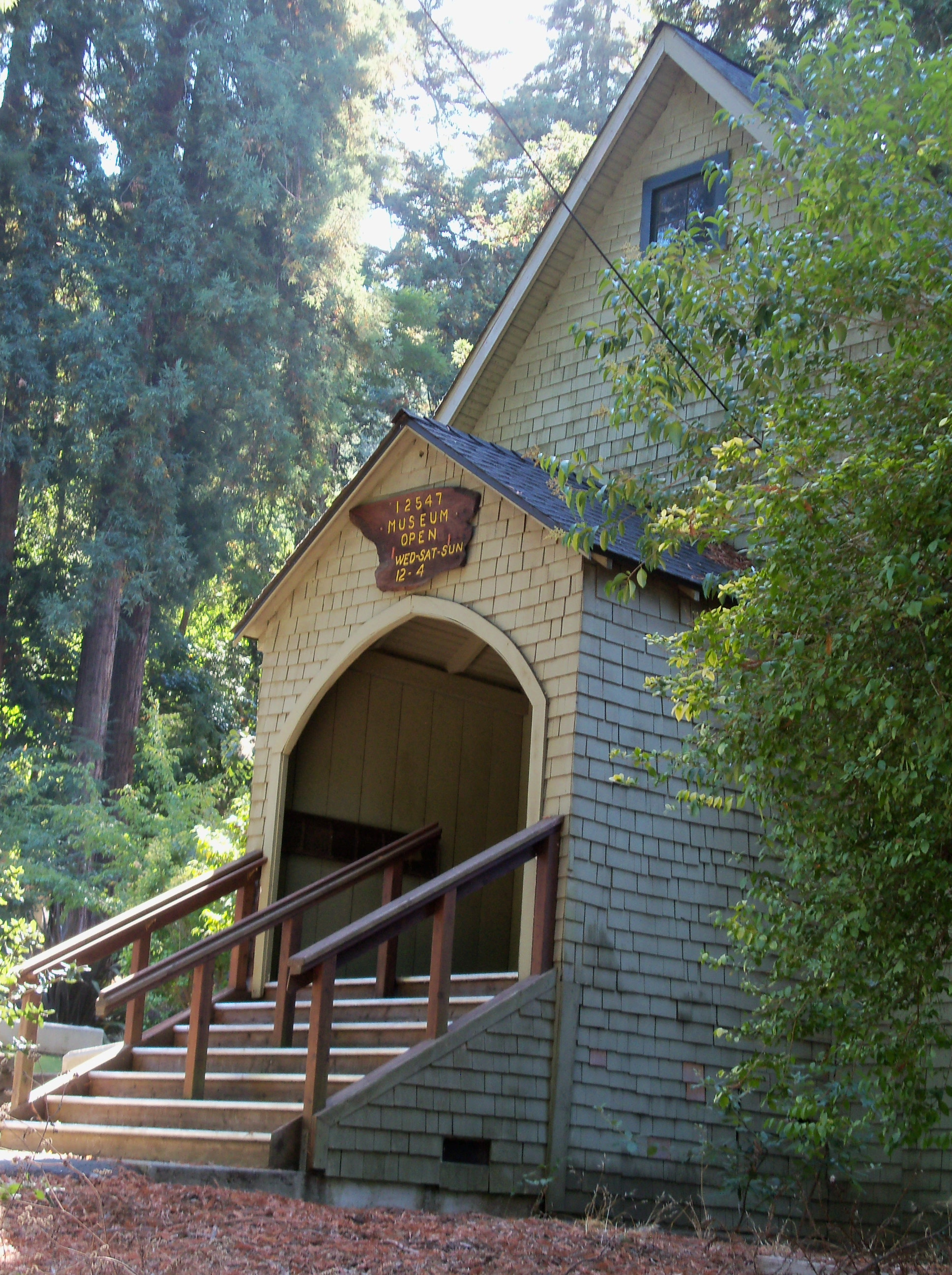

- Location within California Location within the United States
- Location: 12547 CA 9, Boulder Creek, California
- Area: less than one acre
- Built: 1906
- Architectural style: Gothic Revival
- NRHP reference No.: 06001158
- Added to NRHP: December 19, 2006

The former Grace Episcopal Church building, located on State Route 9 in Boulder Creek, houses the San Lorenzo Valley Museum's main gallery, administrative office and information center. Originally located in the former town of Lorenzo, it is currently the oldest religious structure in downtown Boulder Creek. The building is constructed of old-growth redwood in the late Gothic Revival style. It was completed in November 1906 and was listed to the National Register of Historic Places on December 19, 2006, the centenary of its construction.

Grace Mission was established in May 1906 and a plot of land was purchased on which to build a church. Arthur William Wolfston Darwall and his son, Arthur Leicestor, are credited with the construction of the Grace Episcopal Church building. The Episcopal Church did not attracted a large following in Boulder Creek, with most residents instead attending the nearby Presbyterian Church or the Catholic Church, and most Episcopalians attending St. Andrew's Church a mere 3 miles away in Ben Lomond. Congregation numbers began to decline several years after completion. It was decided by the Church around 1915 to consolidate the parishes, with St. Andrews being chosen as the permanent location, and abandoned the structure.

The structure went unused until 1923 when the local Christian Science Society purchased the building. Isaiah and Maude Hartman loaned over half of the amount needed for purchase. Eventually, in 1955, the Society attained full Church Status and changed its name to the First Church of Christ Scientist, Boulder Creek. The adjacent property to the south of the building was purchased for additional parking in 1966 and a Sunday school was built behind the church in 1977. The Church was officially dedicated in 1978. The Church building was sold by the Christian Science Society to the Boulder Creek Historical Society in 1995 to house the San Lorenzo Valley Museum's collections.

The original garden beside the church has also seen constant expansion and improvement since the Museum took control over the property.

=== Faye G. Belardi Memorial Gallery ===
The former Felton Presbyterian Church building, located on Gushee Street in Felton, houses the San Lorenzo Valley Museum's second gallery and temporary exhibitions. It is one of the oldest church structures in the San Lorenzo Valley. The building is a one-story redwood frame vernacular Victorian church. It was completed in July 1893 and was listed to the National Register of Historic Places in 1978.

The building of a religious structure in Felton was not proposed until the winter of 1892. However, the raised donation amount from the town was not enough to start building until Santa Cruz entrepreneur F.A. Hihn donated the land. The church was built by volunteer carpenters from March to July 1893 and was called the Presbyterian Community Church for the next sixty-three years.

By the 1950s, the congregation had outgrown its building and proceeded to move into a larger church to accommodate this growth. A local restaurateur, Nick Belardi, purchased the former church property with the intention of dismantling the building to rebuild a new home. Following community activism of citizens interested in preserving the structure and the death of his wife, Belardi donated the land and the building to the town of Felton, with the stipulation that it would serve as a memorial. Money was raised to carry out necessary renovations but the structure was not dramatically altered. On April 15, 1956, the former church building was dedicated as the Faye G. Belardi Memorial Library.

The Felton Library had outgrown the Belardi building by 2016 and library operations permanently closed in November 2019. An agreement was signed between the San Lorenzo Valley Museum, the Belardi Trust directors, and Felton Library Friends in 2018 to use the building as a Museum exhibition gallery. The Faye G. Belardi Memorial Gallery opened in October 2020 with its debut hosting the Smithsonian's Museum On Main Street "Water|Ways" exhibit.
