= January 1982 California floods =

Flood event in January 1982

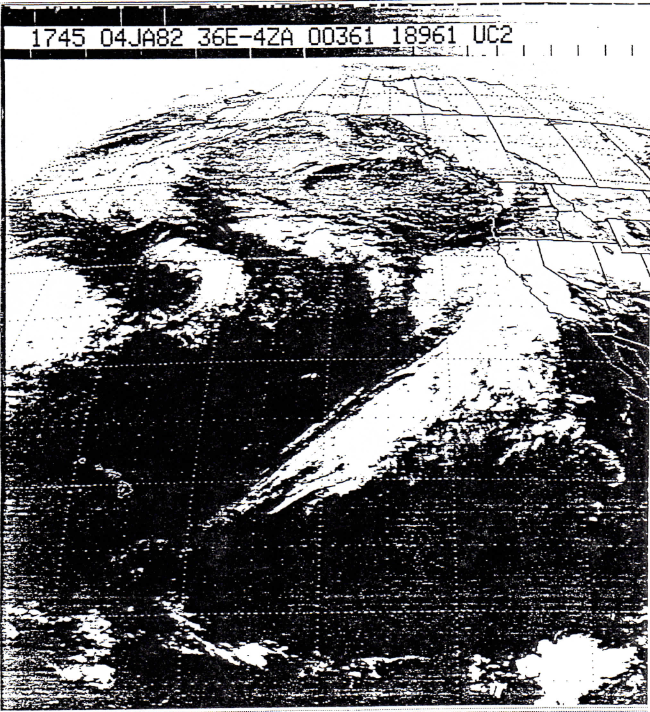
- Satellite image of the storm system that was responsible for the floods, taken on January 4
- Cause: Heavy rains, high tide

Meteorological history
- Duration: January 3–5, 1982

Flood
- Max. rainfall: ~25 inches (640 mm) in the San Lorenzo Valley

Overall effects
- Fatalities: 33
- Injuries: ≥50
- Damage: $280 million (1982 USD)
- Areas affected: San Francisco Bay Area
- Houses destroyed: 231

In a three-day period on January 3–5, 1982, significant flooding occurred in the San Francisco Bay area due to a significant storm system which impacted the area. Widespread rainfall amounts of over 6 inches (150 mm) fell, triggering flooding, with portions of Marin County receiving up to 16 inches (410 mm) of rain and the San Lorenzo Valley receiving up to 25 inches (640 mm). Many homes and communities were isolated due to the flooding and landslides which took place across the Bay area, primarily in Santa Cruz and Marin counties. In the affected areas, thousands of evacuations were initiated, and phone service was unavailable for several days. Additionally, many people were unemployed after damaged businesses were inaccessible. As a result of the floods, 33 people were killed, and $280 million in damages occurred. Additionally, 150,000 people lost power in the region, and over 7,500 homes and businesses were damaged, with more than 250 destroyed. The event was considered one of the worst storms in the region's history.

== Meteorological synopsis ==
At the beginning of the year, a shortwave trough had formed and was moving across the northern Pacific Ocean. This trough moved southeastward and brought cold, moist conditions to California on January 2. As the trough moved into California, a low-pressure area which had formed northwest of Hawaii moved eastward, pushing tropical moisture towards the state and producing thunderstorms. The storms reached the state the following day as another trough formed to the north near British Columbia. The initial low-pressure area moved onshore on January 4, and a cold front developed in northern California, which stalled as it moved through the San Francisco Bay area due to intensifying jet-stream winds being pushed along the Santa Cruz Mountains. Another low-pressure area, which formed in the eastern Pacific earlier that day, came ashore that night, causing storms to remain in place over the Bay area until the following day. In addition, the tides that day were higher than usual, exacerbating the flooding already occurring in some places.

== Impact ==
Through the course of the event, more than 6 inches of rain fell across the region and over 18,000 different landslides swept across its coastal hills with little warning, resulting in $66 million in damage and 25 fatalities from landslide impacts. Thousands of people were evacuated and phone service was taken down across the area for several days. Across the area, 6,300 homes were damaged, with 231 destroyed, while over 1,500 businesses were damaged, with 65 destroyed. Many people became unemployed due to businesses being closed or damaged, and they became inaccessible due to flooding and closures along their routes. The event resulted in 33 fatalities, $280 million in damage, and 150,000 people losing power in California.

=== Santa Cruz County ===
In Santa Cruz County, rainfall amounts of up to 25 inches (640 mm) fell in the San Lorenzo Valley, where 14 people were killed. Over 1,500 people were isolated in the county due to damage to the roads being used to access its communities, caused by flooding and landslides. In Boulder Creek, 100 families were evacuated to avoid further landslides in the area. Water systems were heavily damaged across the county, and over 72,000 people lost power there. As a result of the flooding, landslides, and isolation of homes which had occurred in the county, 22 people were killed, 50 people were injured, and 400 people were displaced from their homes. Additionally, 300 houses were damaged, with 150 being destroyed. Total losses in the county were over $106 million.

==== Love Creek ====
On the night of January 5, just after rain had stopped in the region, a major landslide occurred when residual moisture had caused a large section of a nearby hill to break loose and fall down on Love Creek, which destroyed 30 houses and killed 10 people who were stuck in their homes.

=== Marin County ===
In Marin County, up to 16 inches (410 mm) of rain fell in portions of the county. Multiple landslides occurred within Inverness, covering roads, severely damaging its water systems, and isolating it for several days. In Corte Madera Creek, 8–10 inches (200–250 mm) of rainfall occurred within a day, with 13 inches (330 mm) of rain falling in Kentfield. Due to the damages in the region, roadblocks were set up by California Highway Patrol to prevent people who didn't reside south of Corte Madera from going there. The damage caused by the flooding there amounted to $3 million. Another landslide occurred in Sausalito, killing one person and destroying two homes. Due to the landslide occurring there, 600 people were evacuated within the town. After leaving the county, many people who lived there were stuck in San Francisco for multiple days due to portions of Highway 101 being closed as a result of the landslides. Ferries were used to evacuate the area, running the highest amount of boats there in over 40 years. Overall damages across the county totaled to an estimated $100 million.

=== San Mateo County ===
In San Mateo County, nearly 9 inches (230 mm) of rain fell in the city of Pacifica, where flooding and landslides damaged numerous homes, including some that were swept from their foundation. A large crane was used to clear the rubble and rescue children from a house that was impacted by a landslide. Damages in Pacifica were $5 million in total. Elsewhere in the county, 200 people were evacuated from Pescadero due to flooding which was worsening in the city.

=== Elsewhere ===
In Petaluma, within Sonoma County, nearly 550 homes were flooded when multiple creeks and the Petaluma River overflowed. Homes along the river and the creeks which ran into the river were the most significantly damaged, being inundated in up to 6 feet (1.8 m) of water. In Vallejo, inside Solano County, 1,500 people were evacuated due to the rapid rising of Lake Chabot, which caused officials there to be concerned for the safety of nearby residents. In addition, 650 people under Pacific Gas and Electric along the coasts of Sonoma and Marin counties lost power. In the Sierra Nevada mountain range, 2 feet (0.61 m) of snow fell where 8–12 ft (2.4–3.7 m) snowdrifts had already occurred. A California record 24-hour snowfall of 67 inches was recorded at Echo Summit at Tahoe on January 5. As a result, many skiers there were trapped, all major roads along the range were closed, and over 100 snowslides were triggered by the United States Forest Service to prevent avalanches.

== See also ==
- Floods in California
- 2022–2023 California floods – included multiple flood events which took place at a similar time of year in similar areas 41 years later.
