= Ahlgren =

Ahlgren is a Swedish surname. Notable people with the surname include:

- Alexis Ahlgren (1887–1969), Swedish long-distance runner
- Anders Ahlgren (1888–1976), Swedish Greco-Roman wrestler
- Camilla Ahlgren, Swedish screenwriter, lead writer on 2023 TV series Fallen
- Catharina Ahlgren (1734–1800), Swedish author, poet, translator, journalist, publicist, and feminist
- Chatrine Pålsson Ahlgren (born 1947), Swedish politician
- Christopher Ahlgren, American politician
- Elisabeth Ahlgren (1925–2010), Swedish swimmer
- Ernst Ahlgren (1850–1888), Swedish author
- George Ahlgren (1928–1951), American rower
- Gertrud Ahlgren (1782–1874), Swedish cunning woman
- Martin Ahlgren, Swedish cinematographer
- Mats Ahlgren (born 1967), Swedish fencer
- Nelson Ahlgren (1909–1981), American writer
- Paco Ahlgren (born 1968), American writer, financial analyst, economist, and programmer
- Samuel Ahlgren (1764–1816), Swedish actor
- Ville Ahlgren (born 1993), Finnish ice hockey player

== See also ==
- Ahlgrens, former Swedish confectionery company
- Ahlgren Vineyard, vineyard and winery in California, United States
