= Love Creek =

- Location of the mouth of Love Creek in California

Location
- Country: United States
- State: California
- Counties: Santa Cruz

Physical characteristics
- Source: Santa Cruz Mountains
  - location: Castle Rock Ridge
  - coordinates: 37°8′20.81″N 122°5′6.87″W
  - elevation: 1,000 ft (300 m)
- Mouth: San Lorenzo River
  - location: Ben Lomond
  - coordinates: 37°5′17.81″N 122°5′14.87″W
  - elevation: 295 ft (90 m)

Basin features
- Tributaries
  - right: Fritch Creek

Love Creek is a creek in California. It starts around 1,000 feet above sea level, flows southward through the town of Ben Lomond, California in Santa Cruz County, California, and enters the San Lorenzo River south of Ben Lomond. It is actually on the higher ground side of the business district, which makes the possibility of flooding serious.

On the night of January 5, 1982, during the January 1982 California floods, thirty homes were destroyed and ten people were killed by a massive mudslide.

== Etymology ==
Love Creek gets the name from Captain Harry Love who, in 1853, was in charge of the California Rangers to track down the bandit Joaquin Murieta (some spell it Murrieta). He later moved to the Santa Cruz Mountains and built a sawmill on the stream that was later named for him.

== History ==
Love Creek is remembered because of the landslide in 1982. Quoted from, U.S. Department of the Interior, U.S. Geological Survey USGS Premiers Documentary Film on "Landslide Danger in the Bay Area" 2/20/2007: "In January 1982 a single, catastrophic rainstorm triggered 18,000 landslides throughout the San Francisco Bay Area. The most destructive of these landslides was in the Love Creek area of the Santa Cruz Mountains, where a 1000-foot slab of heavily wooded hill slope crashed down without warning on sleeping residents of Love Creek Heights. Ten of the Love Creek residents were buried by the slide." Quoted from a report on landslides by the USGS: " The slide occurred on the west-facing slope of Love Creek, about 16 km (9.9 mi) north of the city of Santa Cruz. It was about 600 m (2,000 ft) wide, 250 m (820 ft) long, and 10 m (33 ft) thick, with a volume of about 500,000 cubic meters(17.6 million cubic feet). The slide and an accompanying debris flow dammed Love Creek, forming a lake about 300 meters (980 feet) long that flooded several homes."
