= San Lorenzo River =

River in Santa Cruz County, California, United States

San Lorenzo River Rio de San Lorenzo
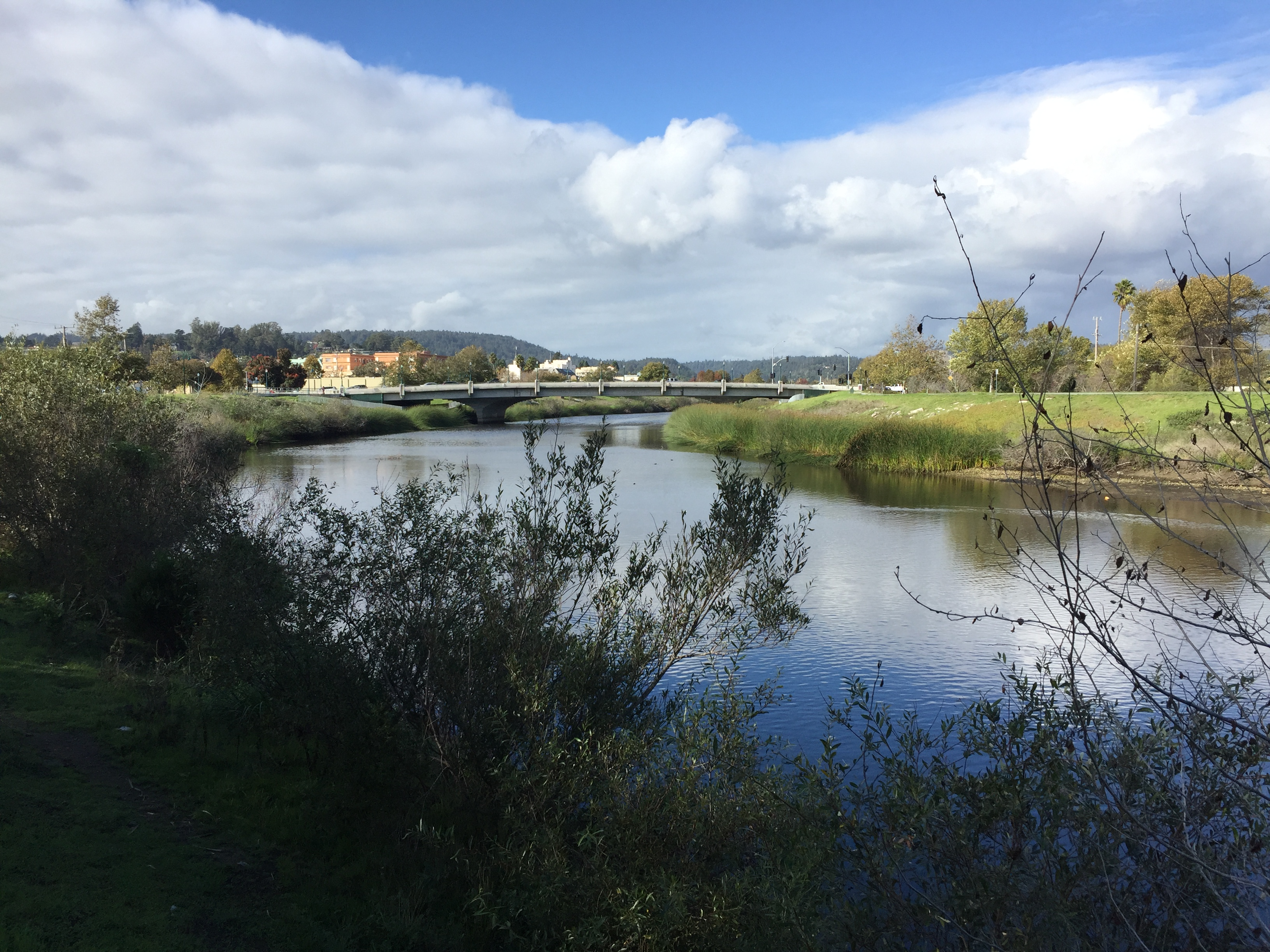
- The San Lorenzo River southeast of downtown Santa Cruz.

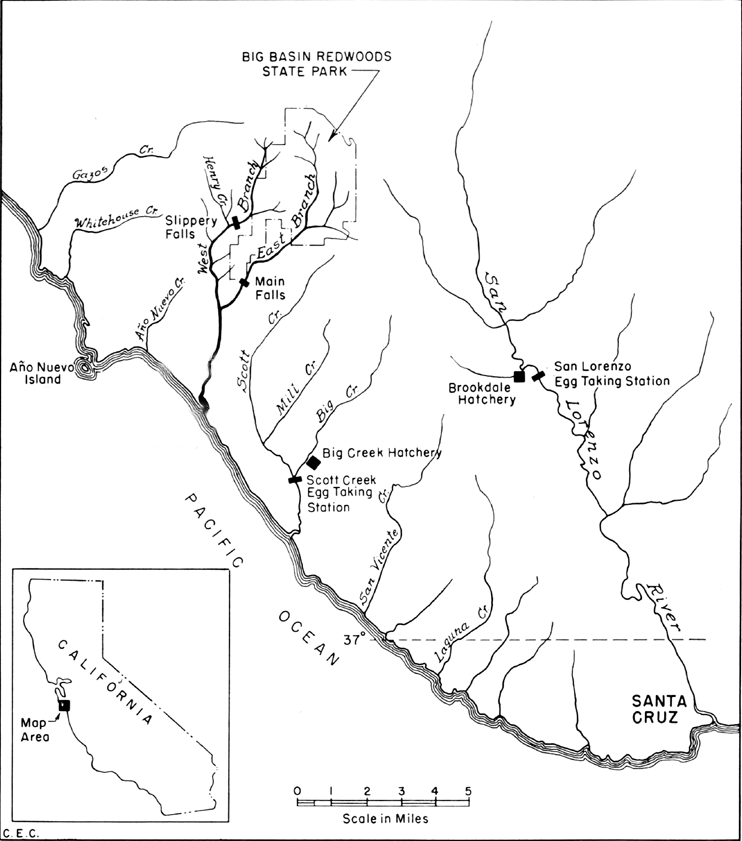
- 1954 Map of Waddell Creek, Scott Creek and San Lorenzo River

Location
- Country: United States
- State: California
- County: Santa Cruz County
- Cities: Boulder Creek, Brookdale, Ben Lomond, Felton, Santa Cruz

Physical characteristics
- Source: Santa Cruz Mountains
  - location: Castle Rock Ridge
  - coordinates: 37°15′15″N 122°07′10″W
  - elevation: 2,670 ft (810 m)
- Mouth: Monterey Bay
  - location: Santa Cruz, California
  - coordinates: 36°57′51″N 122°00′45″W
  - elevation: 0 ft (0 m)
- Length: 29.3 mi (47.2 km)
- Basin size: 138 mi^{2} (360 km^{2})
- Discharge
  - location: Santa Cruz
  - average: 122.4 cu ft/s (3.47 m^{3}/s)

Basin features
- Tributaries
  - left: Craig Springs Creek, Kings Creek, Two Bar Creek, Bear Creek, Spring Creek Gulch, Love Creek, Newell Creek, Zayante Creek, Eagle Creek, Powder Mill Creek, Branciforte Creek
  - right: Tin Can Creek, Spring Creek, Boulder Creek, Malosky Creek, Clear Creek, Alba Creek, Hubbard Gulch, Manson Creek, Fall Creek, Bull Creek, Shingle Mill Creek, Gold Gulch Creek

The San Lorenzo River (Spanish: Río de San Lorenzo) is a 29.3-mile-long (47.2 km) river in the U.S. state of California. The name San Lorenzo derives from the Spanish language for "Saint Lawrence" due to its reported sighting on that saint's feast day by Spanish explorers. Its headwaters originate in Castle Rock State Park in the Santa Cruz Mountains and flow south by southeast through the San Lorenzo Valley before passing through Santa Cruz and emptying into Monterey Bay and the Pacific Ocean.

== Watershed and course ==
The San Lorenzo begins as an intermittent stream around the precipitous slopes of Castle Rock Ridge, a major divide separating drainages of the San Francisco Bay area and the Pacific Ocean, in the Santa Cruz Mountains. Its headwaters is about 1 mile upstream of Castle Rock State Park on private property just south of the Saratoga Gap. Once inside the park's boundary, the perennial river flows approximately 1.5 miles before leaving the unit. Within state park boundaries, Craig Springs Creek, Tin Can Creek, and several small unnamed tributaries empty into the river.

With its headwaters at an elevation of approximately 2,900 feet (880 m) above sea level, the San Lorenzo River drops 2,000 feet (610 m) in the first 3 miles. Starting just south of the Saratoga Toll Road Trail, the river is roughly paralleled by State Route 9 until it enters downtown Boulder Creek. The San Lorenzo reaches 500 feet (150 m) about 2 miles (3.2 km) above Boulder Creek and about 16 miles (26 km) from the mouth of the river. At this elevation, it is joined by Kings Creek from the left in the neighborhood of Redwood Grove, and Spring Creek from the right shortly thereafter. Small, steep tributaries feed the river from the west at Ben Lomond Mountain, while wider, more gently sloping tributaries feed the river from the east and northwest.

The San Lorenzo River watershed drains 138 square miles (360 km^{2}). The Branciforte Creek watershed is a major sub-basin of the San Lorenzo catchment-basin. The Newell Creek tributary was dammed to create Loch Lomond, a reservoir which supplies drinking water to Santa Cruz, California.

== Discharge ==
Discharge of the San Lorenzo River at selected stream gauges
Location	Annual mean discharge	Maximum peak flow	Drainage area	Period of record	Source
Big Trees, CA	128.2 cubic feet per second (3.63 m^{3}/s)	30,400 cubic feet per second (860 m^{3}/s)	106 square miles (270 km^{2})	1937–2022	
Santa Cruz, CA	122.4 cubic feet per second (3.47 m^{3}/s)	30,400 cubic feet per second (860 m^{3}/s)	115 square miles (300 km^{2})	1953–2022	

The upper San Lorenzo generally receives more rainfall during the winter and early spring compared to the lower basin, discharging a higher than usual flow into the river mouth in Santa Cruz. Tributaries in the lower San Lorenzo are prone to atmospheric-river-caused floods, with these storms contributing to large volumes of run-off.

== Geology ==
As recently as the Paleogene period about 65 million years ago, much of California was still part of the Pacific Ocean. The San Lorenzo Valley was at the bottom of a shallow, tropical sea. Tectonic forces and faulting processes pushed up this flat ocean bottom into an ancient mountain range between 50 and 35 million years ago before sinking back into the shallow sea where it was covered with more sediments. About 30 to 25 million years ago, the Pacific Plate and North American Plate changed course and began moving sideways, creating a fault block called the Salinian Block. A second ancient mountain range began to rise during the Miocene, between 15 and 5 million years ago, which eroded and dropped back into the ocean, compressing sand and creating the Santa Margarita sandstone formation. Sediment deposits were laid during this event and epoch, about 10 million years ago, to create the three main rock types found within the San Lorenzo River basin: silt and clay became the layer of Monterey shale; the Santa Margarita sandstone; and as the sea deepened, the deposits became mud, forming the Santa Cruz mudstone layer.

Tectonic forces from the convergence of the Pacific Plate with the North American Plate uplifted the land for a third time along the San Andreas Fault, pushing up the Santa Cruz Mountains between 3 and 4 million years ago. This tectonic compression caused uplift exposing older, predominately marine, Cenozoic sedimentary rocks to weathering, surface erosion, mass wasting, and landslides. The stream valleys and drainage networks of the San Lorenzo River watershed formed through the surface erosion and mass wasting of these sedimentary rocks during the end of the last Ice Age. Geologic erosion from these natural processes line most of the watershed's stream valleys.

The Ben Lomond Fault is a 11-mile-long (18 km) subsidiary bedrock fracture within the San Andreas fault system, which had significant east–west vertical movement. The fault skirts the east and north sides of Ben Lomond Mountain, and is the fracture along which the Ben Lomond Mountain block was tilted up. Uplift of the southwestern block, which began about 40 million years ago, caused a vertical separation of approximately 600 feet (180 m) within the past 12 million years. Deformed rocks of late Cenozoic age indicate a continuation of faulting until about 85,000 years ago. As the Santa Cruz Mountains continued to rise, the San Lorenzo took advantage of rock that was fractured and weakened by faulting processes and began to cut the deeply incised San Lorenzo Valley. The river runs in or near the western edge, and sub-parallel, to the fault.

Underlying rock strata in the San Lorenzo River basin include Lompico Sandstone and Vaqueros Sandstone.

== History ==
The first humans of the San Lorenzo River basin were the Ohlone, who first arrived in the Santa Cruz area about 10,000 years ago. These inhabitants led a generally nomadic lifestyle, gathering plants and hunting small animals. The Achistaca, an Awaswas Ohlone people, were located near present-day Boulder Creek and Riverside Grove of the upper San Lorenzo River area.

During the 16th century, the Spanish began to explore and colonize western North America. It is possible that Juan Rodriguez Cabrillo was the first European to see the San Lorenzo River when in 1542 he sailed the coast of California and stopped in Monterey Bay. Sebastian Vizcaino's 1602-1604 expedition was to further explore the coast and resulted in several detailed maps of the coast, with potential ports for Spain to develop. Beginning in the 18th century, contact with Europeans brought significant changes to the lifestyles of Native Americans in the San Lorenzo River basin. Missionaries sought to convert indigenous peoples to Christianity.

The first European land exploration of Alta California, the Spanish Portolà expedition, gave the river its name when it passed through the area on its way north, camping near the west bank on October 17, 1769. Franciscan missionary Juan Crespi, traveling with the expedition, noted in his diary that, "Not far from the sea we came to a large river...It is one of the largest that we have met with on the journey...This river was named San Lorenzo." "Not far from the sea" indicates that the party probably crossed the river at one of what later became the commonly used fords. The fords, in turn, became the locations for the first two bridges across the river – at today's Water Street and Soquel Avenue.

In 1863, the California Powder Works was built adjacent to the river three miles upstream from Santa Cruz. The powder works made gunpowder for California mining after normal supplies had been interrupted by the American Civil War. Upstream from the works, a dam was constructed (in what is now Henry Cowell Redwoods State Park) to raise the water level enough to flow into a 1200-foot-long tunnel, dug through a granite ridge to convey water to a raised flume that, with a 60-foot drop, provided water power for the powder mill machinery. During dry summer weather when the river was low, the total river flow might be diverted into the flume from below the dam. The powder mill was closed in 1914 and the dam demolished.

== Ecology ==
The basin is an international hotspot of biodiversity because of the unique habitats and ecosystems of the Santa Cruz Mountains.

The San Lorenzo River and its tributaries nourish corridors of riparian growth as they traverse the mountainous regions of the watershed. The plant community of white alder riparian forest intergrades with upland redwood forest in moister locations and mixed evergreen forest in drier situations. Large western sycamore, black cottonwood, white alder, and California box-elder trees dominate the canopy and offer cooling shade for river inhabitants. The arroyo willow forms a subcanopy and stabilizes the river's banks. Common understory species include five-finger fern, coastal wood fern, small-leaved montia, scarlet monkey flower, and skunkweed.

=== Fish migration ===
The San Lorenzo supports several species of anadromous fish that migrate between the Pacific Ocean and freshwater tributaries of the river. Coho and Chinook salmon, "humpback" (pink salmon), "dog" (chum salmon), and steelhead trout, all of the genus Oncorhynchus, are ocean fish that migrate up the rivers at the end of their life cycles to spawn. Pacific lamprey, a semelparous fish, migrates between the ocean and the upstream habitat to breed.

Salmon and other fish populations declined dramatically after the establishment of water diversions, channelization, and dams that affect migration and rearing conditions. In 1960, it was estimated that there were more than 30,000 fish living in this river, but a decade later the population had been reduced to 1,000. Fishing regulations were changed in 1998 in order to protect wild stocks versus hatchery stocks. The changes in regulations have been minimally effective and additional conservation efforts are still needed.

Dams interrupt the migration of anadromous fish. Salmon and steelhead return to the streams in which they were born to spawn; where dams prevent their return, entire populations of fish die. Some of the San Lorenzo River dams employ fish ladders, which are effective to varying degrees at allowing these fish to travel upstream. Another problem exists for the juvenile salmon headed downstream to the ocean. With river currents slowed by the dams, the journey takes longer, which increases the mortality rate.

The San Lorenzo River was once one of the most popular steelhead trout and coho salmon rivers on the Central Coast of California. Approximately 26 miles (42 km) of the San Lorenzo River, and at least nine of its major tributaries, support steelhead. Historically, the San Lorenzo River supported the largest coho salmon and steelhead fishery south of San Francisco Bay, and the fourth largest steelhead fishery in the State of California.

In 1995, a survey of coho salmon south of San Francisco Bay found coho restricted to only one remnant population in Waddell Creek, one small naturalized (hatchery-influenced) population in Scott Creek and a small hatchery-maintained, non-native run in the San Lorenzo River, all in Santa Cruz County. Historically, coho were found in approximately 50 coastal drainages in San Mateo and Santa Cruz counties, but by the 1960s spawning runs were limited to 11 stream systems. The 1995 combined average annual spawning population of native and naturalized coho salmon in Waddell and Scott Creeks was estimated at only 50-60 adults, and none in the San Lorenzo River, comprising only 1.5% of the estimated abundance of coho salmon south of San Francisco Bay in the early 1960s. Coho have returned as a result of stocking efforts at the Kingfisher Flat Hatchery on Scott Creek's Big Creek tributary. Coho salmon had not been recorded in the San Lorenzo River watershed since the early 1980s, until 2005, when at least a dozen adult coho were observed at the city of Santa Cruz Felton diversion fish ladder. In recent decades, continued growth has raised demand for water from the entire watershed system bringing attention to the need for further preservation of stream flows in order to protect young salmon, steelhead, and lamprey. In 2014, coho captured from the lower river were transferred to the Big Creek hatchery to enable local genetics to be used for stocking.

=== Environmental impacts ===
Reduction in flow caused by dams, diversions (Felton and Tait), and evaporation losses from Loch Lomond Reservoir has had ecological consequences in the San Lorenzo River watershed and overall Santa Margarita Basin. Historically, the delta with its large freshwater outflow and salt marshes provided an important breeding ground for aquatic species in the Bay. Today's desiccated delta no longer provides suitable habitat, and populations of fish in the bay have seen a dramatic decline.

Reduced flows have led to increases in the concentration of certain substances in the lower river that have impacted surface water quality. Nitrate impact from the more than 13,000 septic systems in the San Lorenzo River watershed is one of the major issues. The watershed has the highest septic system density of any comparable area in the state of California. Bacteria levels were dangerously high in the 1980s with 3% to 6% of the septic systems failing, discharging untreated sewage to the ground surface and another 7% to 9% of households illegally discharging greywater, which also had a high bacteria and pathogen level.

Groundwater use impacts on surface water baseflow supporting anadromous fisheries for coho salmon and steelhead, particularly in Bean and Zayante Creeks, is another issue. A habitat restoration project has been underway since 1985. Recent counts of fish show the population is slowly rising to approximately 3000. Tidal influence wanes between the Broadway and Soquel Avenue bridges in the city of Santa Cruz, where some sand bars are visible.

Following devastating floods in December 1955, the Army Corps of Engineers built flood control measures along the San Lorenzo River and Branciforte Creek through downtown Santa Cruz. No flooding from the San Lorenzo River was reported when a flow event of nearly equal magnitude occurred in January 1982, but the water levels were much higher than one would expect, based on the original design. That was because a large amount of sediment had re-deposited in the channel after it was built. The original project design (1956) required periodic dredging of the bed sediment, which is both expensive and destructive to aquatic and riparian habitat. The flood control channel was not maintained regularly, presumably for those reasons. The levees and floodwalls were rebuilt in 2004, but the design for those changes still assumed that the channel bed would be maintained by dredging. Although the latest project calls for less dredging the original project, any dredging at all is economically and environmentally unfeasible for the City of Santa Cruz, the local sponsor of the federal project. The current and likely future levels of flood protection provided by the project, without dredging, was being studied by the Army Corps of Engineers as of August 2011.

As early as the 1970s Santa Cruz County began to create a hydrology transport model of the San Lorenzo River, retaining a group of scientists and engineers from Earth Metrics Inc., who were to create the first mathematical model of the river, with the objective of analyzing bedload transport and downstream sedimentation. The model was also used to predict transport of nitrates and other water pollution, and would be eventually used to study a variety of different land management and flood control strategies.

== Scenic elements ==
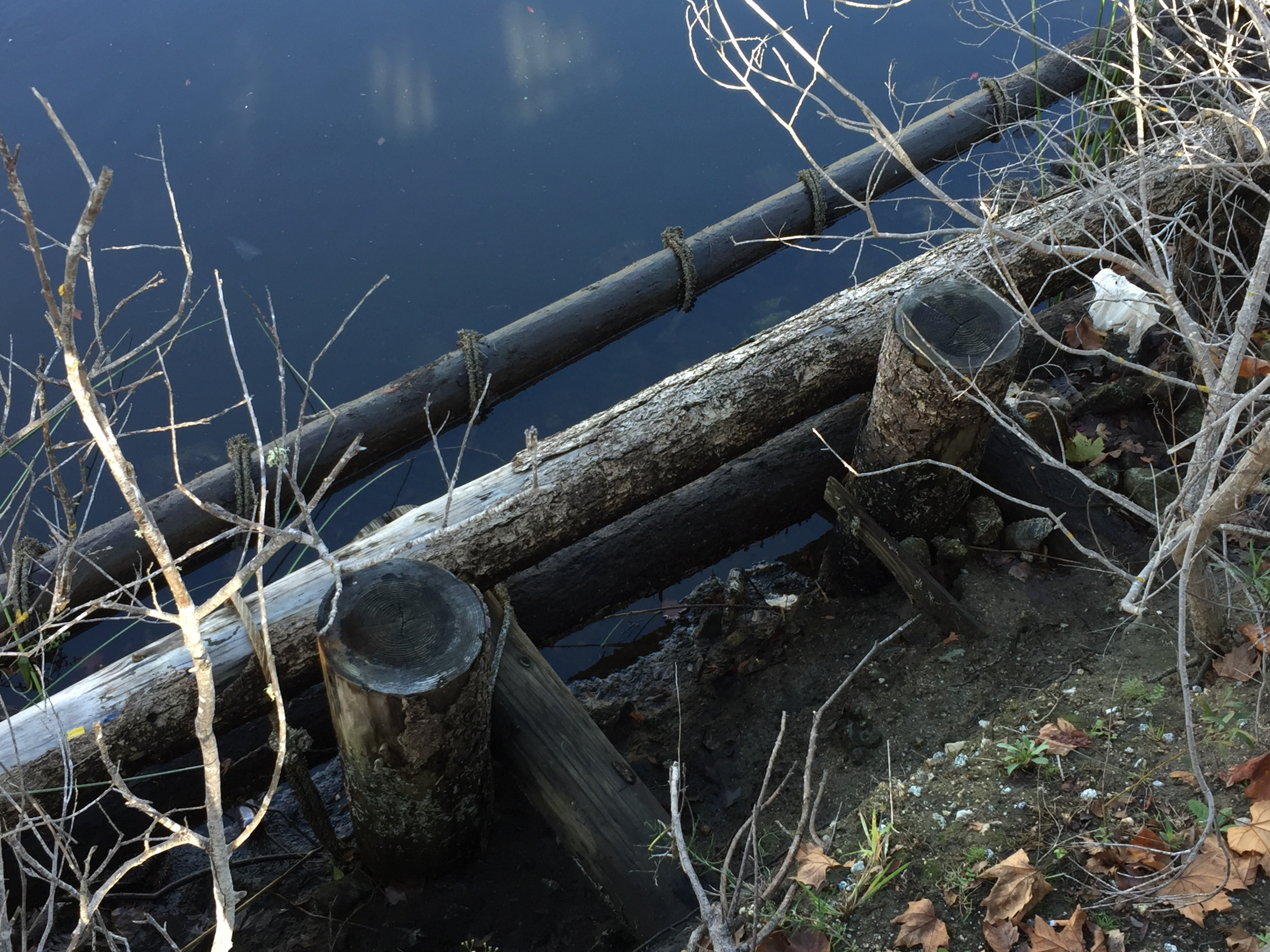
The eroded remains of the original San Lorenzo River Boardwalk.

Much of the upper reaches of this watershed are quite beautiful in their natural forest setting, while the lower reach is accessible to the large population of Santa Cruz. In 1987 the city of Santa Cruz retained ROMA, a San Francisco design firm, to develop a design concept plan for incorporating the natural elements of the river into the urban design fabric of the city. The plan led to creation of pedestrian walkways, picnic areas and view opportunities along the lower populated stretch of the river. The plan called for creation of a continuous forest to be established on the upper banks of Valley Oak, Buckeye, Willow and other trees with seasonal foliage.

One notably scenic reach between the Riverside Avenue and Broadway bridges may be the most visually prominent parts of the river. Here the river bends skirting the base of Beach Hill, a historic neighborhood and noteworthy topographic element of the city of Santa Cruz. This reach is visible from many parts of the city and gives a sense of steepness and enclosure within the channel. The west bank had been the site of a wooden boardwalk, now washed away by erosion.

== See also ==
- Henry Cowell Redwoods State Park
- List of California rivers
- Loch Lomond
