= Fall Creek (San Lorenzo River) =

Stream in California, US

- Location of mouth

Location
- Country: United States
- State: California
- Region: Santa Cruz Counties

Physical characteristics
- Source: Eastern slopes of Ben Lomond Mountain in the Santa Cruz Mountains
  - location: 0.5 mi (1 km) west of Ben Lomond
  - coordinates: 37°05′30″N 122°08′24″W
  - elevation: 2,449 ft (746 m)
- Mouth: San Lorenzo River
  - location: Felton, California
  - coordinates: 37°03′34″N 122°04′42″W
  - elevation: 246 ft (75 m)
- Length: 5.5 mi (8.9 km)

Basin features
- Tributaries
  - right: South Fork Fall Creek

Fall Creek is a 5.5-mile-long (8.9 km) southeastward-flowing stream originating on the eastern slopes of Ben Lomond Mountain in the southern Santa Cruz Mountains in Santa Cruz County, before joining the San Lorenzo River, whose waters flow to Monterey Bay and the Pacific Ocean. Fall Creek is regarded as "the most important tributary stream for coho salmon and steelhead trout in the San Lorenzo River watershed."

== History ==
Fall Creek is a common name for creeks with many waterfalls or cascades. Fall Creek "bounces wild and cool all summer, splashing over granite boulders which make it reminiscent of High Sierra streams."

== Watershed and Course ==
Fall Creek runs southeasterly, beginning just east of Empire Grade road and running over the granitic rock of Ben Lomond Mountain, before ending at its mouth with the San Lorenzo River at the northern portion of Felton, California. At 0.8 miles (1.3 km) from its mouth it is joined by the South Fork Fall Creek.

== Ecology and Conservation ==
The Fall Creek Unit of Henry Cowell Redwoods State Park contains nearly the entire watershed of Fall Creek and its South Fork Fall Creek tributary, and was given to the State of California in 1972 by the Cowell Foundation.

Fall Creek hosts spawning runs for steelhead trout (Oncorhynchus mykiss) and in a 1982 survey, coho salmon (Oncorhynchus kisutch). Fall Creek is considered critical for coho salmon recovery, and is one of the most shaded and coolest tributaries in the San Lorenzo River watershed, providing suitable rearing habitat. The California American Water Company (acquired by acquired by San Lorenzo Valley Water District in 2008) diverts water from Fall Creek for the residents of the Felton area at about stream mile one, which may have an impact on native salmonid fish. The limit of anadromy is at about stream mile three.

== See also ==
- San Lorenzo River
