= Santa Cruz County Board of Supervisors (California) =

County governing body

The Santa Cruz County Board of Supervisors is the governing body for Santa Cruz County, California. As required by California Law, the board comprises five elected members, each of whom represents one of five districts.

== The Board of Supervisors ==
Collectively, the Board of Supervisors is empowered with both legislative and executive authority over the entirety of Santa Cruz County and is the primary governing body for all unincorporated areas within the county. It is estimated that for the 2011-12 fiscal year the Board will administer and allocate a county budget of nearly $620 million.

The Board has five elected members, each of whom represents one of five districts. Taken together, the five districts comprise the entirety of Santa Cruz County.

Current Board Members:

- Manu Koenig - 1st District
- Kimberly De Serpa - 2nd District (current Board Chair)
- Justin Cummings - 3rd District (current Vice Chair)
- Felipe Hernandez - 4th District
- Monica Martinez - 5th District

The Board conducts its meetings in the county seat, Santa Cruz, and is a member of the regional governmental agency Association of Monterey Bay Area Governments.

== Supervisorial Districts ==
Like all other Boards of Supervisors in California, district boundaries are divided roughly equally according to population, using data from the most recent census, and must comply with both California law as well as the federal Voting Rights Act. Boundaries are adjusted decennially based on data reported by the United States Census Bureau for the most recent census.

=== District 1 ===
The 1st District is represented by Manu Koenig. District 1 covers the cities and areas of Live Oak, Soquel, the Summit area, Santa Cruz Gardens, and Carbonera.

=== District 2 ===
The 2nd is represented by Kimberly De Serpa and includes the communities of Aptos, La Selva Beach, Corralitos, Freedom, and portions of both Capitola and Watsonville.

=== District 3 ===
The 3rd District is represented by Supervisor Justin Cummings. The district includes the communities of Davenport, Bonny Doon, the North Coast of Santa Cruz County, as well as a significant portion of the city of Santa Cruz including the University of California, Santa Cruz campus.

=== District 4 ===
Supervisor Felipe Hernandez currently represents the 4th District. As the southernmost supervisorial district in Santa Cruz County, the 4th district encompasses most of the City of Watsonville as well as the surrounding unincorporated areas of the Pajaro Valley.

=== District 5 ===
The 5th District is represented by Supervisor Monica Martinez. The 5th District boundaries include the San Lorenzo Valley, Santa Cruz Mountains, the city of Scotts Valley, portions of the city of Santa Cruz, as well as faculty housing portion of the University of California, Santa Cruz campus.
