= Felton Presbyterian Church =

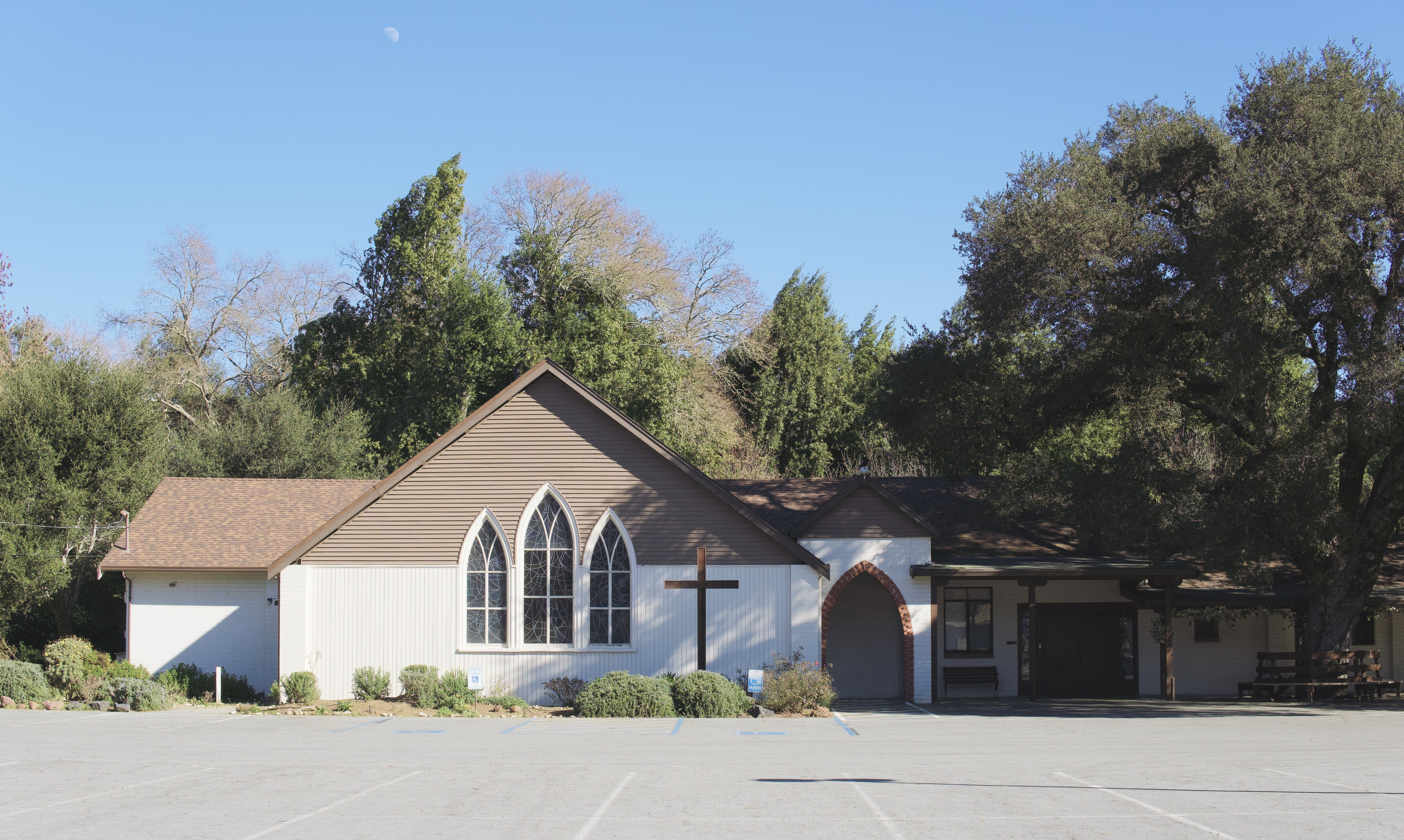

- Location within California
- 37.049215°N 122.072603°W
- Location: 6050 Highway 9, Felton, CA 95018
- Country: United States
- Denomination: ECO: A Covenant Order of Evangelical Presbyterians
- Website: feltonpresbyterian.org

History
- Founded: June 1891

Felton Presbyterian Church is a moderately sized church located in Felton, California.

== History of the church ==
In June 1891, the first board of trustees was elected. The Rev. Alex Eakin was chairman of the meetings that followed when it was decided to build a church and call it the First Presbyterian Church of Felton. That first church, dedicated in June 1893, was built at a cost of $1100 at the corner of Gushee and Felton Empire Road. It was constructed in a traditional, New England style. The little church served the congregation for 62 years. The original building, listed on the National Register of Historic Places, was then used as the Felton Public Library from 1955 to 2019, prior to the 2020 opening of the new Felton Public Library building.
