= Boulder Creek, California =

Boulder Creek
- Census-designated place
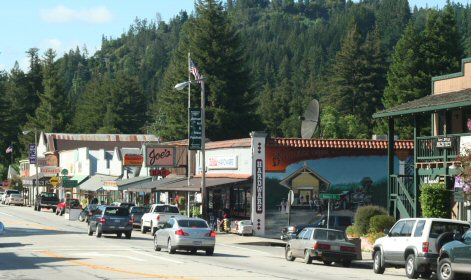
- Looking north from Highway 9 at the Boulder Creek Hardware building and the 70-foot-long (21 m) painted mural by John Ton, depicting two phases of the community's history
- Nicknames: Emerald of the San Lorenzo, Phoenix of the Mountains, "Dodge City" of California
- Interactive map of Boulder Creek
- Location within California Location within the United States
- Coordinates: 37°7′53″N 122°7′28″W
- Country: United States
- State: California
- County: Santa Cruz
- Founded: 1868
- Named for: Boulder Creek

Government
  - Body: Board of Supervisors
  - Supervisor: Monica Martinez (I)
  - Assembly Member: Gail Pellerin (D)
  - State Senator: John Laird (D)
  - United States Representative: Jimmy Panetta (D)

Area
  - Total: 7.51 sq mi (19.46 km^{2})
  - Land: 7.51 sq mi (19.46 km^{2})
  - Water: 0 sq mi (0.00 km^{2}) 0%
- Elevation: 479 ft (146 m)
- Highest elevation: 2,694 ft (821 m)
- Lowest elevation: 324 ft (99 m)

Population (2020)
  - Total: 5,429
  - Density: 722.7/sq mi (279.04/km^{2})
- Time zone: UTC−08:00 (PST)
  - Summer (DST): UTC−07:00 (PDT)
- ZIP code: 95006
- Area code: 831
- FIPS code: 06-07652
- GNIS feature ID: 277478

Boulder Creek (/ˈbəʊl.dər ˈkriːk/) is an unincorporated place in the coastal Santa Cruz Mountains. It is a census-designated place (CDP) in Santa Cruz County, California, United States, with a population of 5,429 as of the 2020 census. Throughout its history, Boulder Creek has been home to a logging town and a resort community, as well as a counter-culture haven. Today, it is identified as the gateway to Big Basin Redwoods State Park.

== History ==
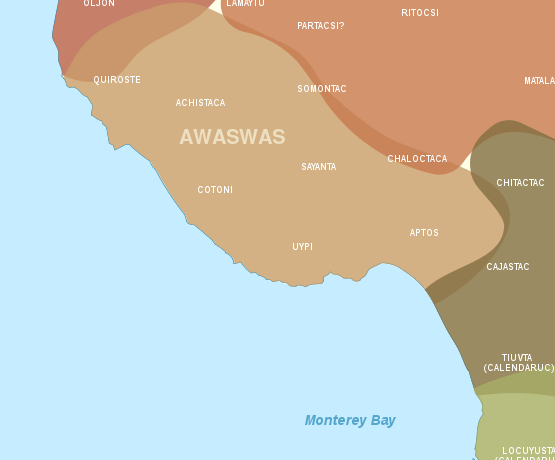
Map of the Awaswas area

The Boulder Creek area is in the traditional tribal territory of the Achistaca, an Awaswas-speaking people of the Ohlone cultural unit, who were a group of contiguous bands that inhabited the coastal region of present-day California from the San Francisco Bay to the Monterey Peninsula and down to San José and Salinas Valley.

There are no living survivors of the Achistaca, who are spoken for by the Amah Mutsun Tribal Band.

According to one anthropologist, the indigenous name for the area was Achista and tentatively included Acsaggi.

The earliest European presence in the area was a Spanish exploratory party in 1769, led overland from Mexico by Don Gaspar de Portolá and Father Juan Crespí. On August 28, 1791, a Spanish mission, Mission Santa Cruz, was established by the Franciscans from Mission Santa Clara de Asís for the conversion of the Awaswas. The Awaswas were moved to Mission Santa Cruz and Mission San Juan Bautista, which claimed the land and peoples. The Awaswas language and its dialects became the main language spoken at Mission Santa Cruz.

Upon independence from Spain in 1821, the area became a part of Mexico. Although Spain had not awarded land grants in the Santa Cruz area, the Mexican government started issuing them in 1822 when it took over the administration of California. Most of the grants lay along the coast, with the only ones within the San Lorenzo Valley being Rancho Zayante and Rancho San Agustin. Under Mexican administration, only natural citizens could own land. Although not a Mexican citizen, in 1841, Isaac Graham purchased the Rancho Zayante land grant by proxy from frontiersman and naturalized Mexican citizen Joseph Ladd Majors. In 1843, together with Peter Lassen, Graham built one of the first water-powered sawmills in California and, with it, the first significant settlement in the area. Graham's settlement marked the beginning of San Lorenzo Valley's lumber-based economy.

Following the Mexican–American War of 1846–1848 and the California Gold Rush of 1848, the area steadily grew in population, including considerable immigration. While the Treaty of Guadalupe Hidalgo ending the War obliged the United States to honor Mexican land grants, the process took many years of court hearings. In the meantime, squatters and entrepreneurs moved into the valley to harvest its rich resources of timber and lime. Despite the lack of roads, many families braved the wilderness to homestead the upper San Lorenzo. There were few large operations in the upper San Lorenzo Valley, leading the pioneers to develop their own systems of harvesting and transporting to the lumber and tanning markets. Logging in the valley supplied large timbers to shore up the underground workings of the mines after the initial rush of gold-panning gave way to other mining techniques. By the late 1850s, early settlers and lumbermen were using the Turkey Foot floodplain as a gathering point for their mule and oxen teams.

=== Timber town ===
Branciford Alcorn was one of the first to settle along Bear Creek in 1865. Daniel Crediford and his sons Wilfred and Stephen moved about four miles (6.4 km) up Boulder Creek to the Sequoia district in 1867. West Virginian Joseph Wilbur Peery also settled in the Boulder area in 1867 and began a small-scale logging project along the San Lorenzo River. Peery built a dam across the river at Two Bar Creek to provide water power to his mill and for the one he later built two miles (3.2 km) south of the junction of the river, Boulder and Bear creeks. Twin brothers Austin and Oscar Harmon assisted at the Two Bar Creek mill until its closure. The erection of the Two Bar Creek sawmill by Peery later helped in the establishment of the settlement of Boulder.

The year 1868 was the founding year for the settlement of Boulder. Transportation remained a problem, slowing development of the small communities that now dotted the valley. A road extension from Graham Hill Road linking the upper San Lorenzo valley with Santa Cruz through Felton was completed in May. It also marked the completion of the United States government's survey of all land not held by grants in the Santa Cruz Mountains, which was then opened for purchase and homesteading. Government surveyors divided the largely unsettled San Lorenzo Valley into claimable sections. The area of Boulder Creek occupied two 160-acre (65 ha) tracts. The northern half, between Harmon and Bear Creeks, was awarded to John Alcorn, Branciford's son. Loggers moved up the San Lorenzo and its tributaries removing every marketable tree that were then sold to the demanding market of the San Francisco Bay area. The lumbermen and their families moved into scattered cottages and homes around the periphery of Peery's Two Bar Creek sawmill, while a general store, livery stable, and blacksmith shop arose nearby to support the mill and its visitors. The increase in the number of families with children determined the need for a school, the first one of which was started in a small building on Alcorn's land on what is now West Park Drive.

Lumber could not be shipped over the mountains to Santa Clara Valley. Two years later in 1871, another road extension, the Saratoga Toll Road, was added from the summit at the Saratoga Gap and ran 11 miles (18 km) to meet the road that ran about four miles (6.4 km) above Boulder Creek. In June, the Maclay Turnpike officially opened. Alcorn erected a two-story boarding house, the Boulder Creek House. That same year, Peery was awarded a land grant and relocated his lumber mill a mile south to Lorenzo, a settlement that he laid out, which was bounded by what is now Harmon, West, South, and East Streets. With an access point to the greater San Francisco Bay Area came the establishment of a post office named Boulder Creek in 1872, with Peery becoming the first postmaster. Mail runs were limited to twice a week because it took a mail carrier two days to travel from Santa Clara to Felton.

What is now Boulder Creek was originally once two settlements: Lorenzo at the southern end of town, and Boulder was north of the current town core.

Boulder Creek served as the upper terminus of the San Lorenzo Valley Logging Flume terminating in Felton, which began construction in 1874 and, when formally opened in October 1875, was augmented by a new rail line to transport logs to the wharf in Santa Cruz. In the 1880s, this lumber town which was called Lorenzo took the name of the Boulder Creek post office that had been established in the 1870s.

In 1915, residents of Boulder Creek voted to disincorporate the city (the process of abolishing the city and returning the area back to county rule). Two years later, the California State Legislature enacted a law which also disincorporated nearby Felton.

== Geography ==
Boulder Creek is located on the West Coast of the United States. The community has a total area of 7.5 square miles (19 km^{2}), of which all is land. The community is bordered by San Mateo County to the northwest; Santa Clara County to the northeast; Big Basin Redwoods State Park to the west; and Brookdale to the south. Boulder Creek is 15 miles (24 km) from Santa Cruz, 30 miles (48 km) from San Jose, 70 miles (110 km) from San Francisco, and 150 miles (240 km) from Sacramento.

Boulder Creek sits at the north end of the San Lorenzo Valley at the confluence of San Lorenzo River and Boulder Creek within the Santa Cruz Mountains, a Level IV ecoregion designated by the United States Environmental Protection Agency (EPA), an area surrounded by steep, redwood- and pine- covered hills formed by the river, creek, and their tributaries. The river flows through Boulder Creek on the east and south through Brookdale, Ben Lomond, and Felton, and continues south to the City of Santa Cruz where it enters Monterey Bay. Directly across from Boulder Creek's confluence with the San Lorenzo River, Bear Creek flows into the river and creates a topographical feature known as the Turkey Foot. The Turkey Foot creates a floodplain, particularly on the western side of the river where the mountainside is less steep.

=== Climate ===
Boulder Creek has a warm-summer Mediterranean climate (Köppen Csb) characteristic of California's coast, with moist, mild winters and dry summers. Located about 15 miles (24 km) inland, the Boulder Creek skies can be overcast due to moisture from the Pacific Coast marine layer.

The dry period of May to October is mild to warm, with the normal monthly mean temperature peaking in August at 81.0 °F (27.2 °C). The rainy period of November to April is slightly cooler, with the normal monthly mean temperature reaching its lowest in December at 38.0 °F (3.3 °C). On average, there are 75 rainy days a year, and annual precipitation averages 52 inches (1,321 mm). Variation in precipitation from year to year is high, with a maximum of 112 inches (2,845 mm) in 1983 and a minimum of 19 inches (483 mm) in 1986. Above-average rain years are often associated with warm El Niño conditions in the Pacific while dry years often occur in cold water La Niña periods.

Boulder Creek falls under the USDA 9b Plant hardiness zone.

Climate data for Boulder Creek, California
Month	Jan	Feb	Mar	Apr	May	Jun	Jul	Aug	Sep	Oct	Nov	Dec	Year
Mean daily maximum °F (°C)	59 (15)	59 (15)	59 (15)	61 (16)	63 (17)	68 (20)	70 (21)	72 (22)	72 (22)	68 (20)	63 (17)	57 (14)	64 (18)
Daily mean °F (°C)	52.3 (11.3)	52.3 (11.3)	52.7 (11.5)	54.3 (12.4)	56.7 (13.7)	60.3 (15.7)	62.6 (17.0)	63.9 (17.7)	64.4 (18.0)	61.7 (16.5)	56.1 (13.4)	51.8 (11.0)	57.4 (14.1)
Mean daily minimum °F (°C)	48 (9)	46 (8)	48 (9)	48 (9)	50 (10)	54 (12)	55 (13)	57 (14)	59 (15)	57 (14)	52 (11)	48 (9)	52 (11)
Average precipitation inches (mm)	5.16 (131.0)	4.37 (110.9)	4.96 (126.0)	1.64 (41.6)	0.70 (17.7)	0.16 (4.0)	0.06 (1.4)	0.01 (0.2)	0.22 (5.7)	1.49 (37.9)	2.64 (67.0)	5.12 (130.0)	26.53 (673.4)
Average rainy days	9.8	9.1	13.3	7.6	5	1.4	1.6	1.4	3.2	4.7	7.1	10	74.2
Average relative humidity (%)	71.1	70.5	74.2	72.3	72.8	71.2	71.1	72.3	67.9	66.1	66.4	70.4	70.5
Mean monthly sunshine hours	195.3	180.8	241.8	309	331.7	351	372	357	330	220.1	201	182.9	3,272.6
Mean daily sunshine hours	6.3	6.4	7.8	10.3	10.7	11.7	12	11.9	11	7.1	6.7	5.9	9.0
Mean daily daylight hours	10	10.9	12	13.2	14.2	14.7	14.4	13.5	12.4	11.2	10.2	9.7	12.2
Average ultraviolet index	3	3	4	4	4	5	5	5	5	4	3	3	4
Source 1: World Weather Online (2009–2023)
Source 2: Weather Atlas(Sunshine - Rainy Days)

==== Flooding ====
Flooding of the San Lorenzo River, caused by a combination of high tide, storm surge, and runoff, has been known to cause extensive damage. A Santa Cruz Surf newspaper article from January 25, 1890, mentioned the San Lorenzo River being at its highest known since 1849, with Boulder Creek having received 90 inches (2,300 mm) of rainfall up to that date during the 1889-90 winter season. A log jam was reported at the junction of the river and Bear Creek, with Boulder Creek being "higher than ever known". Bear Creek Bridge gave way and a cottage from the tributary Hesse Creek was carried by flood waters down to Boulder Creek, where it was stopped by rescue parties. There was one casualty. In an April 19 article of the San Francisco Examiner that same year, Boulder Creek held first place in the season's precipitation with 122.11 inches (3,102 mm) of rain received.

According to a March 24 article of the Santa Cruz Morning Sentinel, the 1907 flood destroyed and swept away all five bridges within town limits that connected the eastern and western sides of Boulder Creek - Booth, Schroder, Swinging Bridge, Barker, and Grover Dam bridge.

Modern records began in 1937 with the highest river level rise recorded during the December 1955 storm from December 22 to 23. According to the Santa Cruz Sentinel-News, Boulder Creek recorded 32.42 inches (823 mm) of rain during that storm. Within the area, Highway 9 in the vicinity of Wildwood Grove had minor undercutting of the road fill and Riverside Grove experienced principal residential damage.

During the January 1982 El Niño storm, from January 3 to 4, 12.74 inches (324 mm) of rainfall occurred in Boulder Creek over the period of 24 hours. This generated debris flows and shallow landslides. During the El Niño winter of 1996 and 1997, higher concentrations of debris flows were observed in the area around Boulder Creek.

==== Fire ====
Fires have occurred throughout Boulder Creek's history as almost all of the town is within a fire hazard severity zone, making fire insurance difficult to get or expensive.

Two conflagration-sized fires nearly destroyed downtown Boulder Creek and the nearby village of Lorenzo on July 17, 1891.

The CZU Lightning Complex fires started on August 16, 2020, due to a severe thunderstorm that initially started several separate fires. Due to a change in wind conditions, these separate fires merged and rapidly spread through nearby communities, including Boulder Creek. The CZU fire incident was finally contained on September 22, after destroying a number of houses but sparing the town's historic main street.

== Cityscape ==
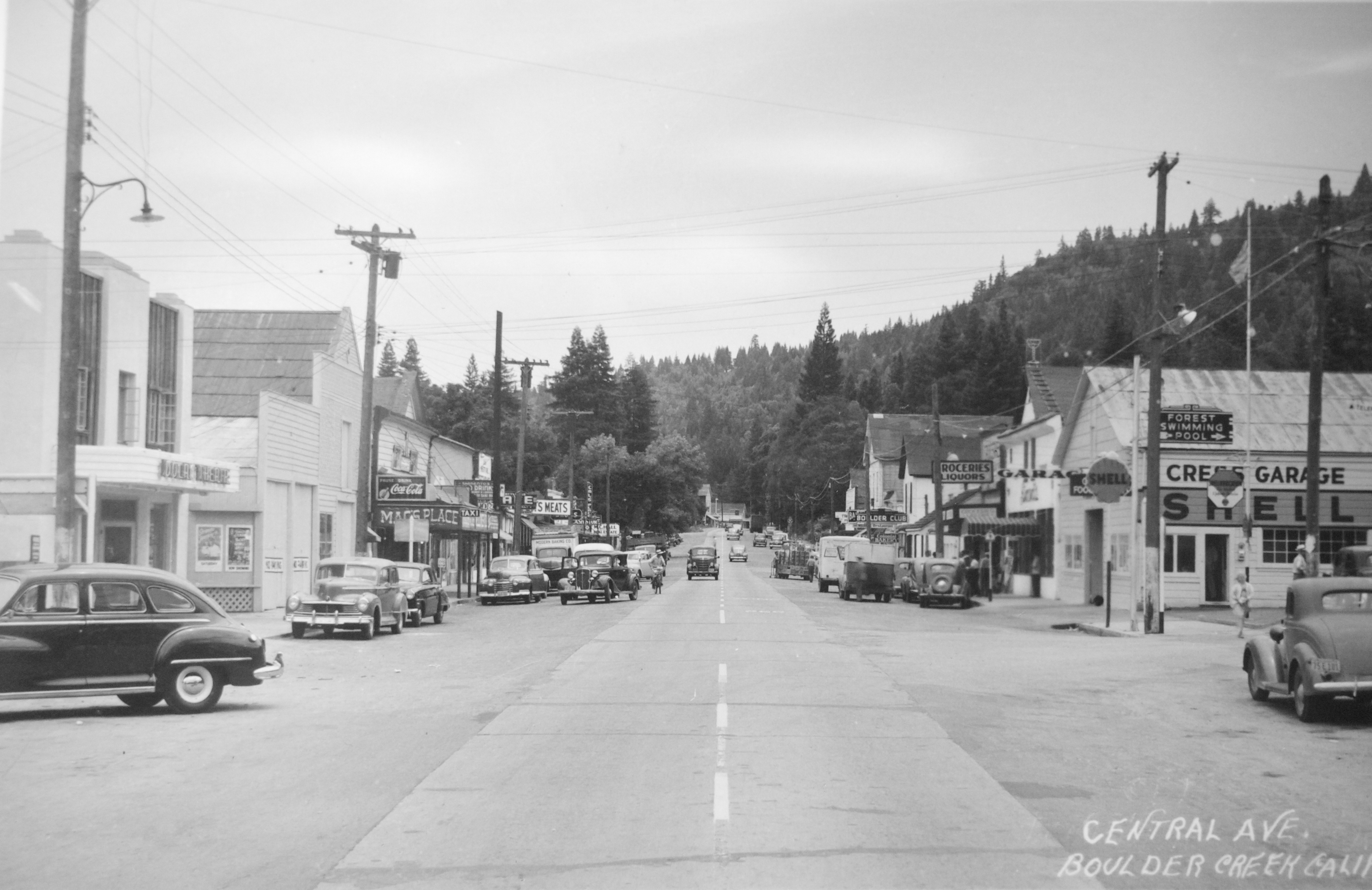
Central Avenue c. 1930s, before being designated Highway 9

California State Route 9 enters Boulder Creek from the south at River Street, bisecting the community as the Central Avenue arterial thoroughfare, before passing by Bear Creek Road to the northeast and becoming SR 9 once again. Within the community core, Route 9 connects to the southern terminus of California State Route 236 with an at-grade intersection, which provides access to the northwest of the community as Big Basin Way. Route 236 then continues westward from Boulder Creek and into Big Basin Redwoods State Park.

The community is divided into three geographical sections of unequal size: Village Core, South Village, and Outlying Village Areas.

=== Architecture ===
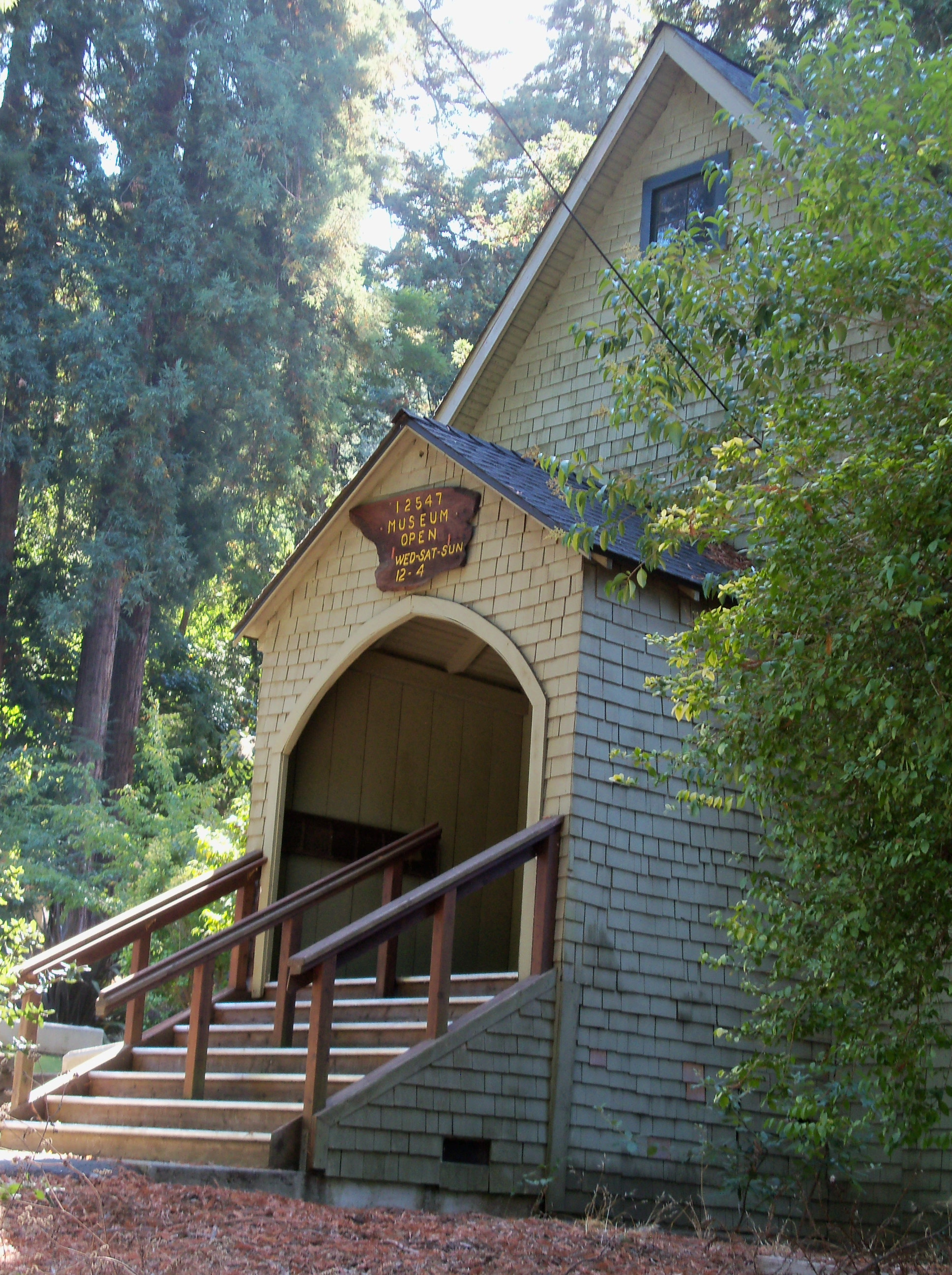
The Grace Episcopal Church, built in the late Gothic Revival style, is the oldest church building in Boulder Creek.

The architecture of Boulder Creek varies but is generally popular among tourists and locals. Many of the commercial buildings along Central Avenue are designed primarily in the Boomtown style. Historic buildings are designed primarily in the Queen Anne and a variety of Victorian styles. For examples, the designs of the McLeod House and the Stagg/Hartman House are drawn from these architectural movements. Modern and other non-classical architectural styles, such as Minimal Traditional and Ranch, are also seen throughout the community. Outside downtown Boulder Creek, architectural styles are even more varied. The former Grace Episcopal Church is designed in the Gothic Revival style.

== Demographics ==
Historical population
Year	Pop.	±%
1890	489	—
1905	800	+63.6%
1910	1,018	+27.2%
1950	1,497	+47.1%
1960	1,306	−12.8%
1970	1,806	+38.3%
1980	5,662	+213.5%
1990	6,725	+18.8%
2000	4,081	−39.3%
2010	4,923	+20.6%
2020	5,429	+10.3%
U.S. Decennial Census; 1860–1870 1880-1890; 1900 1910 1920; 1930 1940 1950; 1960 1970 1980; 1990 2000 2010; 2020

Boulder Creek first appeared as an unincorporated community in the 1950 U.S. census; and as a census-designated place in the 1980 United States census.

=== Racial and ethnic composition ===
Boulder Creek CDP, California – Racial and ethnic composition Note: the US Census treats Hispanic/Latino as an ethnic category. This table excludes Latinos from the racial categories and assigns them to a separate category. Hispanics/Latinos may be of any race.
Race / Ethnicity (NH = Non-Hispanic)	Pop 2000	Pop 2010	Pop 2020	% 2000	% 2010	% 2020
White alone (NH)	3,540	4,234	4,142	86.74%	86.00%	76.29%
Black or African American alone (NH)	22	45	28	0.54%	0.91%	0.52%
Native American or Alaska Native alone (NH)	39	19	22	0.96%	0.39%	0.41%
Asian alone (NH)	70	77	117	1.72%	1.56%	2.16%
Native Hawaiian or Pacific Islander alone (NH)	8	4	12	0.20%	0.08%	0.22%
Other race alone (NH)	35	21	61	0.86%	0.43%	1.12%
Mixed race or Multiracial (NH)	135	157	411	3.31%	3.19%	7.57%
Hispanic or Latino (any race)	232	366	636	5.68%	7.43%	11.71%
Total	4,081	4,923	5,429	100.00%	100.00%	100.00%

=== 2020 census ===
As of the 2020 census, Boulder Creek had a population of 5,429 and a population density of 722.7 inhabitants per square mile (279.0/km^{2}).

The age distribution was 17.2% under the age of 18, 5.6% aged 18 to 24, 25.5% aged 25 to 44, 32.5% aged 45 to 64, and 19.2% who were 65 years of age or older. The median age was 46.3 years. For every 100 females, there were 103.1 males, and for every 100 females age 18 and over, there were 100.9 males age 18 and over.

The census reported that 99.6% of the population lived in households, 0.4% lived in non-institutionalized group quarters, and no one was institutionalized. 94.4% of residents lived in urban areas, while 5.6% lived in rural areas.

There were 2,301 households, out of which 23.3% included children under the age of 18, 45.5% were married-couple households, 8.5% were cohabiting couple households, 23.0% had a female householder with no spouse or partner present, and 22.9% had a male householder with no spouse or partner present. 28.4% of households were one person, and 12.7% were one person aged 65 or older. The average household size was 2.35. There were 1,406 families (61.1% of all households).

There were 2,505 housing units at an average density of 333.5 units per square mile (128.8 units/km^{2}), of which 2,301 (91.9%) were occupied and 8.1% were vacant. Of occupied units, 70.5% were owner-occupied and 29.5% were occupied by renters. The homeowner vacancy rate was 1.1%, and the rental vacancy rate was 2.0%.

=== Income and poverty ===
In 2023, the US Census Bureau estimated that the median household income was $106,842, and the per capita income was $56,934. About 0.8% of families and 5.1% of the population were below the poverty line.

=== 2010 census ===
The 2010 United States census reported that Boulder Creek had a population of 4,923. The population density was 655.4 inhabitants per square mile (253.1/km^{2}). The racial makeup of Boulder Creek was 4,429 (90.0%) White, 54 (1.1%) African American, 31 (0.6%) Native American, 81 (1.6%) Asian, 5 (0.1%) Pacific Islander, 119 (2.4%) from other races, and 204 (4.1%) from two or more races. Hispanic or Latino of any race were 366 persons (7.4%).

The Census reported that 100% of the population lived in households.

There were 2,124 households, out of which 548 (25.8%) had children under the age of 18 living in them, 997 (46.9%) were opposite-sex married couples living together, 176 (8.3%) had a female householder with no husband present, 97 (4.6%) had a male householder with no wife present. There were 189 (8.9%) unmarried opposite-sex partnerships, and 29 (1.4%) same-sex married couples or partnerships. 598 households (28.2%) were made up of individuals, and 129 (6.1%) had someone living alone who was 65 years of age or older. The average household size was 2.32. There were 1,270 families (59.8% of all households); the average family size was 2.80.

The population was spread out, with 884 people (18.0%) under the age of 18, 319 people (6.5%) aged 18 to 24, 1,222 people (24.8%) aged 25 to 44, 2,066 people (42.0%) aged 45 to 64, and 432 people (8.8%) who were 65 years of age or older. The median age was 45.4 years. For every 100 females, there were 105.2 males. For every 100 females age 18 and over, there were 104.3 males.

There were 2,455 housing units at an average density of 326.8 per square mile (126.2/km^{2}), of which 71.6% were owner-occupied and 28.4% were occupied by renters. The homeowner vacancy rate was 2.1%; the rental vacancy rate was 6.5%. 74.0% of the population lived in owner-occupied housing units and 26.0% lived in rental housing units.

== Economy ==
The area's economy was historically based on the timber and lime industries, but now relies on tourism. As the closest community to Big Basin Redwoods State Park, Boulder Creek provides services to some of Big Basin's visitors. Many of its current residents are retirees, families and professionals who commute to nearby jobs.

== Culture ==
=== Museums ===
The San Lorenzo Valley Museum is an educational foundation that maintains two of the area's official museums. The California Humanities and the National Endowment for the Humanities (NEH) partially fund the Museum, and its permanent and temporary exhibits are open to the public free of charge. Its main gallery is in Boulder Creek, which is housed in the former Grace Episcopal Church, a historical landmark listed on the National Register of Historic Places. The other location is the Faye G. Belardi Memorial Gallery in Felton.

=== Festivals and street fairs ===
Boulder Creek is home to several unique street festivals, parties, and parades. Most famous are the annual Fourth of July Parade, Halloween Trick-or-Treat Street, and the town tree lighting and Santa Comes to Town celebration (now called Boulder Creek Winter Festival) first weekend of December, as well as the annual Reindeer Run 5k race on Christmas Eve. First Friday Boulder Creek is a lively street vendor market that takes over the sidewalks of the historic district every first Friday of the month. Several events no longer occur: Lumberjack Days held every July; Christmas in the Redwoods in November; and Boulder Creek Art, Wine, and Music Festival, held every Memorial Day Weekend on Central Avenue for more than 20 years.

== Government ==
Boulder Creek is an unincorporated community, a status it has held since being dis-incorporated during the 1915 session of the California State Legislature. While Boulder Creek is not governed at the municipal level, it does consist of a number of entities to support its needs. Its executive and legislative governing body is the Santa Cruz County Board of Supervisors and in the county-wide elections, Boulder Creek forms part of District Five. The Board acts in place of a city council. Because of its unincorporated status, Santa Cruz County provides land use planning, parks, public works, and economic development services and regulations.

In the California State Legislature, Boulder Creek is in the 17th Senate District and previously in the 29th Assembly District. As of the 2022 redistricting, the community now falls under the 28th Assembly District.

In the United States House of Representatives, Boulder Creek was in California's 18th congressional district. As of the 2023 redistricting, the community now falls under the 19th congressional district.

=== Departments and agencies ===
Independent and semi-independent entities include the:

- Boulder Creek Business Association
- Boulder Creek Fire Protection District
- Boulder Creek Recreation and Park District

== Education ==
San Lorenzo Valley Unified School District (SLVUSD), the sole public school district in the community, operates the community's single public elementary school, Boulder Creek Elementary. In the 2021–22 school year, 445 students were enrolled in the public elementary school. From sixth to twelfth grades, Boulder Creek students attend San Lorenzo Valley Middle and High Schools, both located in Felton.

The community is also home to three private schools (PK, PK-K, 1–12), one of which is a Montessori Teacher-run pre-school, and one public charter school (K-12). Santa Cruz Public Libraries operates one neighborhood location, the Boulder Creek Branch Library.

== Media ==
KBCZ Boulder Creek Community Radio is a non-profit, community-based radio station broadcasting live to the San Lorenzo Valley. The license was purchased in June 2013 and is owned by the Boulder Creek Recreation and Park District. KBCZ Studios are located at 13200 Central Ave. Studio A in downtown Boulder Creek. KBCZ's General Manager is Hallie Greene. KBCZ's Station Manager is Tina Davey. The FCC granted extended coverage in 2021 for the frequency 89.3fm. KBCZ now covers all of the San Lorenzo Valley, Scotts Valley, Lompico and parts of Santa Cruz. KBCZ recently opened its second live radio studio also ay 13200 Central Ave, "Studio B"

== Notable people ==
- Michael Been (1950–2010) - musician; resident
- Pat Burrell - Major League Baseball Player
- Aric Cushing – actor, director, author
- Cora Evans – Catholic mystic; resident
- Jonathan Franzen – author; resident for several years
- Nick Herbert – physicist and author; resident
- Christopher Hills - author; resident
- Jordan Hubbard - FreeBSD co-founder; resident
- Paul Locatelli - Jesuit priest and academic; born in Boulder Creek
- Martan Mann - jazz pianist, educator, author; resident
- Tom Pepper – Nullsoft co-founder; resident
- Samuel H. Rambo – California State Senator; resident

== See also ==
- Ahlgren Vineyard
- DigiBarn Computer Museum
