= Cora Evans =

American Catholic mystic (1904–1957)

Servant of God Cora Louise Evans
- Born: Cora Louise Yorgason; July 9, 1904; Midvale, Utah, U.S.
- Died: March 30, 1957 (aged 52); Boulder Creek, California, U.S.
- Spouse: Maclellan J. Evans (m. 1924)

Cora Louise Evans (July 9, 1904 – March 30, 1957) was an American homemaker who was raised in The Church of Jesus Christ of Latter-day Saints and eventually converted to Catholicism in 1935. She reported seeing visions of Jesus and the Saints, and a mission to promote what she referred to as the "Mystical Humanity of Christ". She is a candidate for canonization, and the move to canonize Cora Evans was sealed by the bishops and sent to Rome for formal consideration. A parishioner of Our Lady of the Pillar in Half Moon Bay, California is the promoter of her cause for canonization. The diocese of the parishioner, the Diocese of Monterey, not to be confused with the Archdiocese of Monterrey, began the first step of the canonization of Evans in 2010 after a letter was sent by the parishioner to bishop Richard John Garcia. The parishioner is a cousin whose family was close to Evans.

== Conversion and visions ==
Evans was a Mormon but became disillusioned with Mormonism and was baptized into the Catholic Church in 1935 in Utah. Her husband and daughters did the same soon after.

She later said she received visions of Jesus and the Saints, which she promoted as "The Mystical Humanity of Christ." Her cause of canonization and beatification has been approved by the Holy See, gaining her the title Servant of God, and the cause of canonization and beatification continues to be handled by the Diocese of Monterey in California.

== Veneration ==
In June 2010, the cause of beatification and canonization was officially opened. Twelve years later, in the fall of 2022, the United States Conference of Catholic Bishops voted to advance the cause of canonization and beatification to the diocesan level.
