= Boulder Creek (California) =

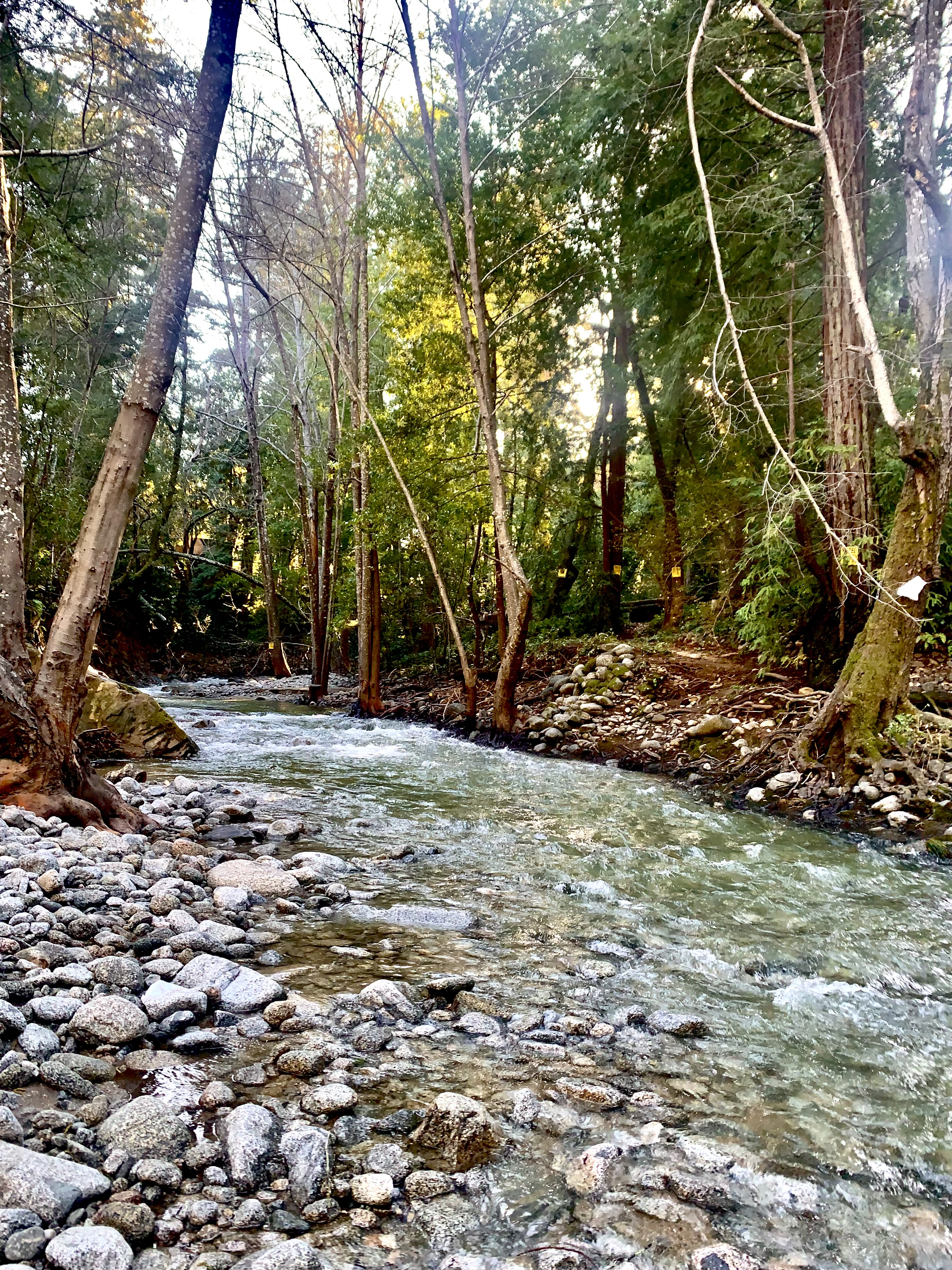
- The mouth of Boulder Creek

- Location of the mouth of Boulder Creek in California

Location
- Country: United States
- State: California
- Counties: Santa Cruz

Physical characteristics
- Source: Santa Cruz Mountains
  - location: Big Basin Redwoods State Park
  - coordinates: 37°12′11.80″N 122°11′57.88″W
  - elevation: 1,932.51 ft (589.03 m)
- Mouth: San Lorenzo River
  - location: Boulder Creek
  - coordinates: 37°7′36.81″N 122°7′15.87″W
  - elevation: 436 ft (133 m)
- Length: 7.9 mi (12.7 km)
- Basin size: 11.3 sq mi (29 km^{2})

Basin features
- Tributaries
  - left: Bracken Brae Creek
  - right: Hare Creek, Jamison Creek, Peavine Creek, Silver Creek, Foreman Creek

Boulder Creek is a 7.9-mile-long (13 km) stream tributary of the San Lorenzo River in the U.S. state of California. Its drainage basin consists of approximately 11.3 square miles (29.3 km^{2}) of Santa Cruz County. Its main stem begins high in the Santa Cruz Mountains in Big Basin Redwoods State Park. It flows generally south, through the Park and unincorporated community of Boulder Creek, before finally emptying into the San Lorenzo River in the community's downtown.

== Course ==
Boulder Creek begins in the Santa Cruz Mountains within Big Basin Redwoods State Park near the Santa Cruz/San Mateo County border, north of California State Route 236. It flows generally southeast over approximately 7.9 miles (12.7 km) to its confluence with the San Lorenzo River. Its headwaters are at 1,932.51 feet (589.03 m) above sea level. Boulder Creek's mouth is at 436 feet (133 m) above sea level.

Boulder Creek's headwaters are just north of SR 236. The Skyline-to-the-Sea Trail passes through this area. It flows south and is crossed by SR 236. The creek runs parallel to China Grade Road from the road's northern terminus to its southern terminus, crossing at the road's approximate halfway point, where it receives an unnamed tributary on the left bank. The creek continues southeast and receives an unnamed tributary on the right bank.

Just after being crossed by Foxglove Lane about 4 miles north of downtown Boulder Creek, the creek receives a second unnamed tributary on the left bank. It then turns sharply southwest at the intersection of SR 236 and Branson Ranch Road, where it receives a second unnamed tributary on the right bank. The creek runs parallel with SR 236 from this convergence until it reaches its confluence with the San Lorenzo River. The creek then turns south, crossing under Melissa Lane. It receives a third unnamed tributary on the left bank before flowing through the Boulder Creek Golf and Country Club and under West Hilton Drive.

Boulder Creek receives Hare Creek, 1.56 miles (2.51 km) in length and at 797 feet (243 m) in elevation, on the right bank within the boundaries of the Country Club. Downstream of the Hare Creek confluence, the creek flows through a heavily shaded canyon with steep, near-vertical walls and a streambed dominated by large granitic cobbles and boulders in turbulent riffles and runs. A few miles southeast, the creek is crossed by SR 236 at Lucille's Court. It next receives Jamison Creek, 2.33 miles (3.75 km) in length and 758 feet (231 m) in elevation, on the right bank near the Jamison Creek Fire Station 23.

At the neighborhood of Bracken Brae, Boulder Creek flows southeast and receives Bracken Brae Creek, 0.5 miles (0.80 km) in length and 643 feet (196 m) in elevation, on the left bank. The creek is crossed by SR 236 for the third time, where it receives Peavine Creek, 640 feet (200 m) in elevation, on the right bank. Peavine Creek is located 1.4 miles from downtown Boulder Creek in the steep terrain of the eastern slope of Ben Lomond Mountain with a 12-foot vertical drop. Water is diverted here into a gravity pipeline (the Peavine Pipeline) and ultimately to the Lyon Surface Water Treatment Plant in Boulder Creek. Further downstream, the creek receives Silver Creek, 0.52 miles (0.84 km) in length and 623 feet (190 m) in elevation, on the right bank. SR 236 crosses the creek at Chipmunk Hollow Road.

From between Boulder Brook Drive and South Redwood Drive, Boulder Creek receives Foreman Creek, 545 feet (166 m) in elevation, and, a little further downstream, a sixth unnamed tributary, both on the right. The creek is crossed by Boulder Creek Bridge in downtown. It then flows into the San Lorenzo River 15 miles (24 km) from its mouth at the Pacific Ocean. Boulder Creek's mouth is in Junction Park within downtown Boulder Creek.
