= KBCZ =

- Boulder Creek, California; United States
- Frequency: 89.3 MHz
- Branding: Boulder Creek Community Radio

History
- First air date: July 2, 2012

Technical information
- Licensing authority: FCC
- Facility ID: 175847
- Class: A
- ERP: 115 watts
- HAAT: −176 meters (−577 ft)
- Transmitter coordinates: 37°07′14.70″N 122°06′13.90″W

Links
- Public license information: Public file; LMS
- Webcast: Listen live
- Website: kbcz.org

KBCZ is a class A radio station broadcasting a community radio format to Boulder Creek, California.

== History ==
KBCZ began broadcasting on July 15, 2016.

== See also ==
- List of community radio stations in the United States
