= Brookdale, California =

Brookdale
- census-designated place
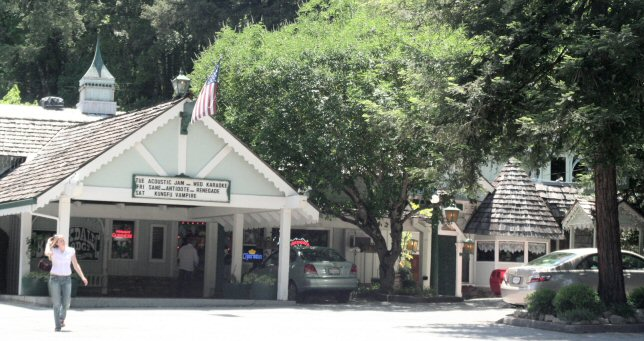
- The Brookdale Lodge in Brookdale, California

- Location of Brookdale in Santa Cruz County, California.

- Location in California
- Coordinates: 37°06′21″N 122°06′38″W
- Country: United States
- State: California
- County: Santa Cruz

Area
  - Total: 3.85 sq mi (9.96 km^{2})
  - Land: 3.85 sq mi (9.96 km^{2})
  - Water: 0 sq mi (0.00 km^{2}) 0%
- Elevation: 405 ft (123 m)

Population (2020)
  - Total: 2,043
  - Density: 531.1/sq mi (205.06/km^{2})
- Time zone: UTC-8 (Pacific (PST))
  - Summer (DST): UTC-7 (PDT)
- ZIP Code: 95007
- Area code: 831
- GNIS feature ID: 2582951

Brookdale is a census-designated place (CDP) in Santa Cruz County, California, United States. Brookdale sits at an elevation of 405 feet (123 m). It is located in the San Lorenzo Valley between Boulder Creek and Ben Lomond on Highway 9. The 2020 United States census reported Brookdale's population as 2,043.

The ZIP Code is 95007 and the community is served by area code 831. There is no mail delivery in Brookdale, though no home is more than 1.5 miles from the post office.

== History ==
The area was previously known as Clear Creek and then Brookville, and was the site of the Grover Lumber Mill by 1870. Logging and lumber was the major industry throughout the Santa Cruz Mountains at the time. James Harvey Logan, a Santa Cruz judge and creator of the loganberry, purchased the mill in 1900, created a creekside resort with cabins and camping, and established the Brookdale post office in 1902.

=== The Brookdale Lodge ===
Brookdale Lodge, a historic resort complex, is the main business in Brookdale. It was famous for decades, known especially for the stream running through its primary restaurant, the Brook Room (closed for renovation as of 2019). It currently has a reputation for being haunted by numerous ghosts. Started by Judge Logan, by 1922 it was owned by Dr. F. K. Camp, a Seventh-day Adventist physician, who envisioned a dining room spanning the creek and hired Horace Cotton of San Francisco to design it.

In its day, the Brookdale Lodge was the second most popular resort in California and hosted the rich and famous ... Hollywood stars, prominent families, foreign diplomats, and even President Herbert Hoover visited the scenic lodge. Famous persons passing through Brookdale Lodge included: Mae West, Marilyn Monroe, Tyrone Power, Joan Crawford, Rita Hayworth, Hedy Lamarr, and President Herbert Hoover. Shirley Temple and Johnny Weissmuller had homes nearby. Herbert Hoover visited often, and enjoyed fishing off the dining room bridge. And during the San Francisco conference establishing the United Nations, world leaders and diplomats came to the lodge to relax. The lodge was also famous for its first rate entertainment, attracting the best big band and swing groups of the era. There are at least three swing era songs written about the Brookdale including, My Brookdale Hideaway, A Place Known as Brookdale, and Beautiful Brookdale Lodge.

The lodge has changed hands many times since, and was condemned after a fire in 2009. Since 2016 it has been owned by Pravin and Naina Patel. The lodge appeared on the paranormal show Ghost Adventures in 2012. The property has once again been sold and is undergoing intensive renovations.

=== Fires ===
There have been three large fires at the Lodge, the last of suspicious origin.

The first occurred on October 24, 1956. In that fire the dining room and an adjoining 12-room house were destroyed. A group of stores adjacent to the dining room were also badly damaged. Damage from the 1956 fire was estimated at $200,000.

The second occurred in 2005 in the same area of the main hotel as the 2009 fire.

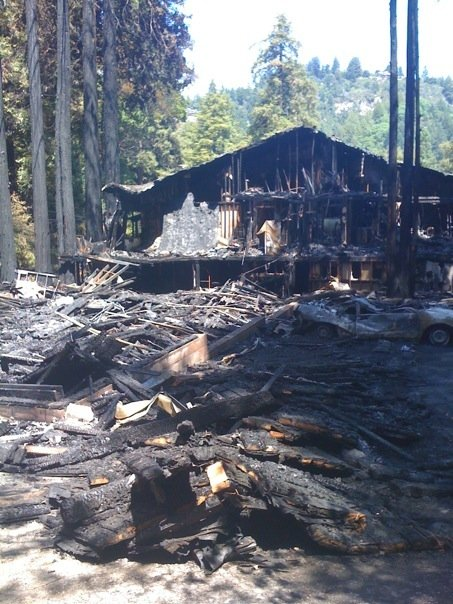
Damaged section of the lodge after the 2009 fire

On August 18, 2009, a fire engulfed a two-story section of the lodge near the rear of the main building that contains apartments mostly occupied by lodge employees. There were no reports of injuries to anybody staying at the inn, though some firefighters suffered minor injuries while fighting the blaze.

The origin of the fire is still under investigation and the U.S. Bureau of Alcohol, Tobacco, Firearms and Explosives is helping to determine the cause of the three-alarm fire. According to the Boulder Creek Fire Chief the fire started under suspicious circumstances.

== Geography ==
According to the United States Census Bureau, the CDP covers an area of 3.8 square miles (10.0 km^{2}), all land.

=== Climate ===
This region experiences warm (but not hot) and dry summers, with no average monthly temperatures above 71.6 °F. According to the Köppen Climate Classification system, Brookdale has a warm-summer Mediterranean climate, abbreviated "Csb" on climate maps.

== Demographics ==
Historical population
Census	Pop.	Note	%±
2010	1,991		—
2020	2,043		2.6%
U.S. Decennial Census; 2010

Brookdale first appeared as a census designated place in the 2010 U.S. census.

=== Racial and ethnic composition ===
Brookdale CDP, California – Racial and ethnic composition Note: the US Census treats Hispanic/Latino as an ethnic category. This table excludes Latinos from the racial categories and assigns them to a separate category. Hispanics/Latinos may be of any race.
Race / Ethnicity (NH = Non-Hispanic)	Pop 2010	Pop 2020	% 2010	% 2020
White alone (NH)	1,680	1,571	84.38%	76.90%
Black or African American alone (NH)	9	18	0.45%	0.88%
Native American or Alaska Native alone (NH)	10	17	0.50%	0.83%
Asian alone (NH)	17	52	0.85%	2.55%
Native Hawaiian or Pacific Islander alone (NH)	8	1	0.40%	0.05%
Other race alone (NH)	4	20	0.20%	0.98%
Mixed race or Multiracial (NH)	61	127	3.06%	6.22%
Hispanic or Latino (any race)	202	237	10.15%	11.60%
Total	1,991	2,043	100.00%	100.00%

=== 2020 census ===
As of the 2020 census, Brookdale had a population of 2,043. The population density was 531.1 inhabitants per square mile (205.1/km^{2}). 91.3% of residents lived in urban areas, while 8.7% lived in rural areas.

The whole population lived in households. There were 810 households, out of which 25.1% included children under the age of 18, 46.9% were married-couple households, 9.5% were cohabiting couple households, 24.3% had a female householder with no spouse or partner present, and 19.3% had a male householder with no spouse or partner present. 25.3% of households were one person, and 11.3% had someone living alone who was 65 years of age or older. The average household size was 2.52. There were 509 families (62.8% of all households).

The age distribution was 16.5% under the age of 18, 7.4% aged 18 to 24, 26.5% aged 25 to 44, 30.1% aged 45 to 64, and 19.4% who were 65 years of age or older. The median age was 44.2 years. For every 100 females, there were 103.9 males, and for every 100 females age 18 and over, there were 102.0 males age 18 and over.

There were 903 housing units at an average density of 234.7 units per square mile (90.6 units/km^{2}), of which 810 (89.7%) were occupied. Of these, 63.7% were owner-occupied, and 36.3% were occupied by renters. 10.3% of housing units were vacant, with a homeowner vacancy rate of 1.9% and a rental vacancy rate of 3.0%.
