= Felton Presbyterian Church (historic building) =

Historic church in California, United States

- U.S. National Register of Historic Places
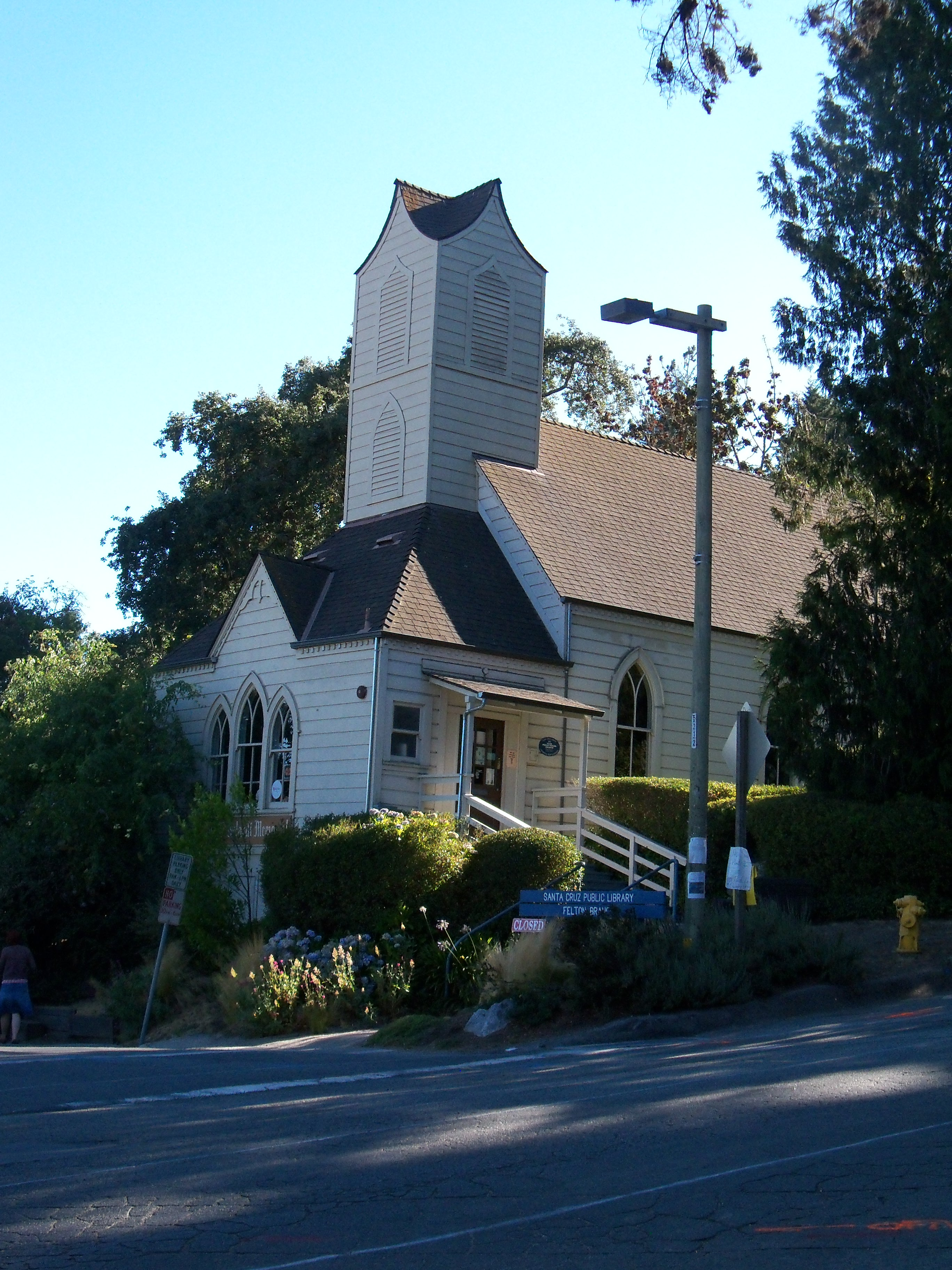

- Location within California Location within the United States
- Location: 6299 Gushee St., Felton, California
- Coordinates: 37°3′10″N 122°4′24″W
- Area: less than one acre
- Built: 1893
- Architectural style: Victorian
- NRHP reference No.: 78000774
- Added to NRHP: April 6, 1978

The Felton Presbyterian Church (Historical Building) is a former public library and church building in Felton, California. It was located in a historic building at 6299 Gushee Street, built in 1893, known formerly as Felton Presbyterian Church. The building is listed on the National Register of Historic Places under its former name.

== History ==
The building was listed on the National Register in 1978.

The building was used as the Felton Public Library from 1956 to 2019. The new Felton Public Library building, next to the Felton post office on Gushee Street, was scheduled to open in February 2020.

== See also ==
- Felton Presbyterian Church, current church, located at 6090 Highway 9, three-tenths of a mile away
