= Samuel H. Rambo =

American businessman and politician

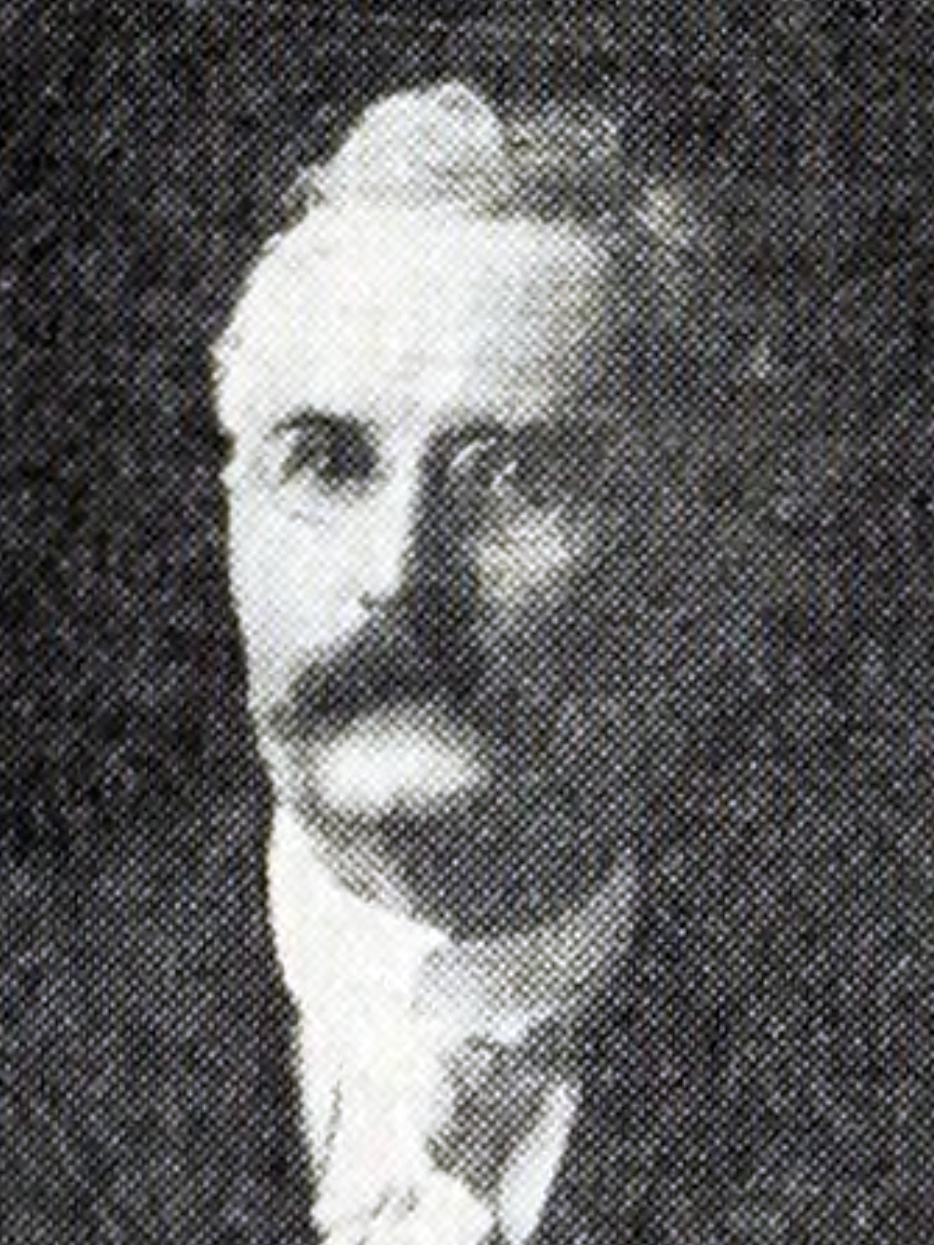

Member of the California Senate from the 29th district
- In office January 2, 1905 – January 4, 1909
- Preceded by: James D. Byrnes
- Succeeded by: James Bernard Holohan

Personal details
- Born: October 12, 1843 Mercer County, Pennsylvania, U.S.
- Died: October 10, 1920 (aged 76) Boulder Creek, California, U.S.
- Party: Republican

Military service
- Branch/service: United States Army
- Battles/wars: American Civil War

Samuel Henry Rambo (October 12, 1843 – October 10, 1920) was an American businessman and Republican politician.

Rambo was born in Pennsylvania, and was brought up there and in Kansas. A logger and merchant, he served in the Eleventh Kansas Infantry during the American Civil War. In 1878 he moved to California, where he lived first in Santa Clara and later in San Jose, finally settling in Boulder Creek. He held numerous official positions, including Santa Cruz County Supervisor, State Senator, and the Head of Big Basin Park (later the first California State Park).
