= Felton Public Library =

Book lending, Santa Cruz County, California

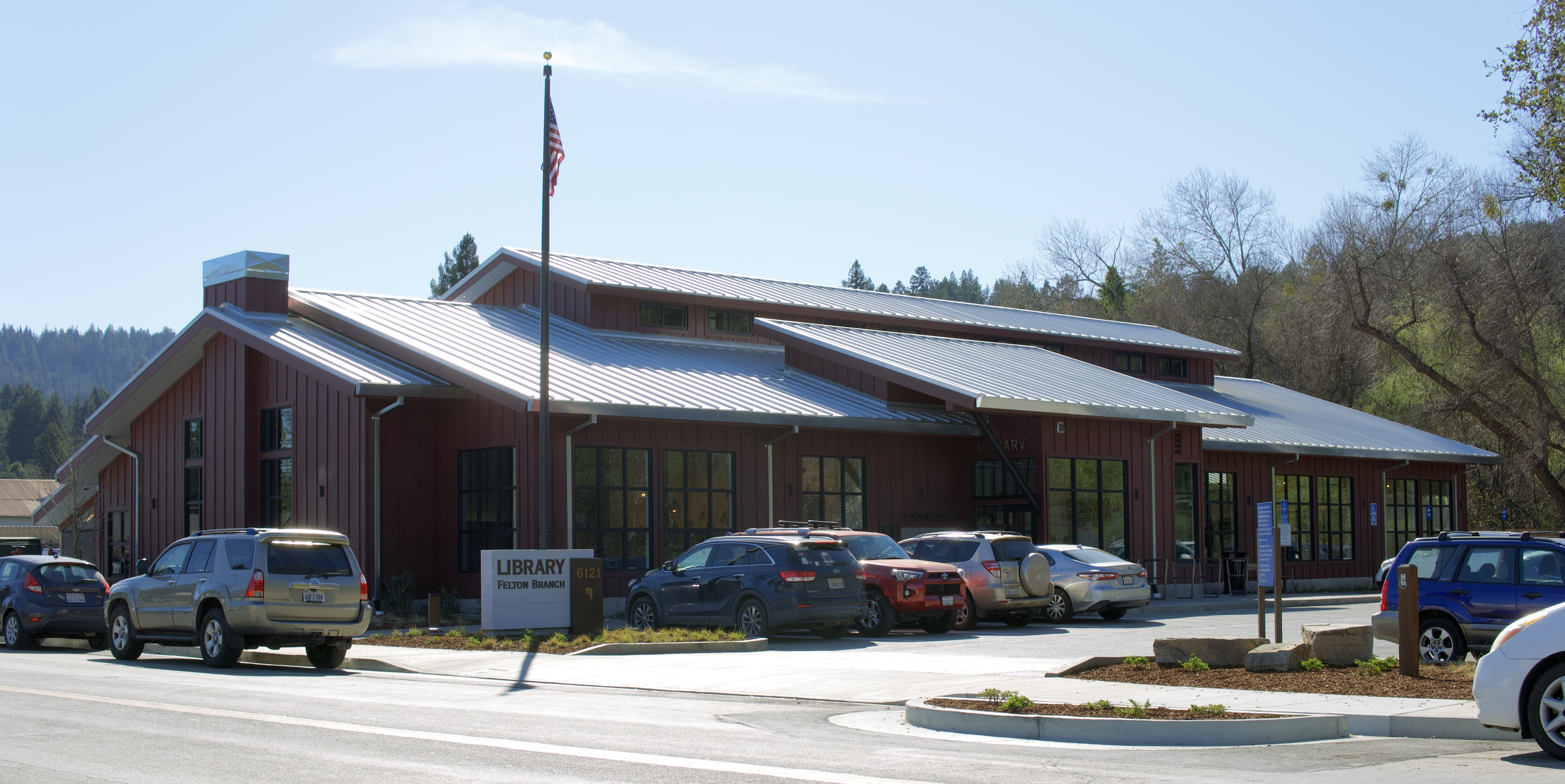
- 37.049981°N 122.074472°W
- Location: 6121 Gushee Street; Felton, California, United States
- Type: Public
- Service area: San Lorenzo Valley
- Branch of: Santa Cruz Public Library

Access and use
- Population served: General

Other information
- Website: www.santacruzpl.org

The Felton Public Library serves the residents of San Lorenzo Valley in Santa Cruz County, California in the United States. Its 8,900-square-foot (830 m^{2}) building is located next to the post office, at 6121 Gushee St. The 2-acre (8,100 m^{2}) Felton Discovery Park extends out from its doors.

== History ==
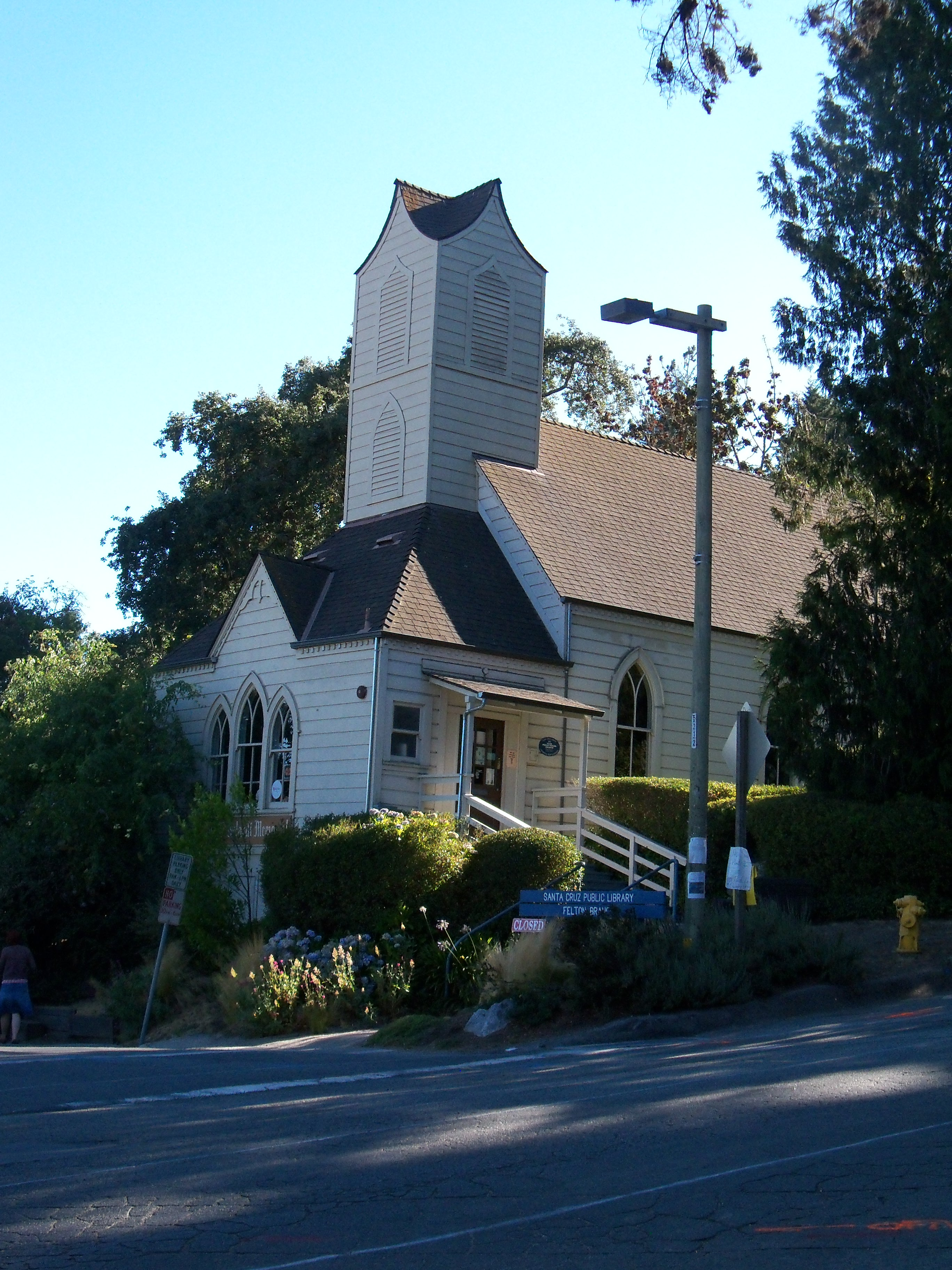
Former location at 6299 Gushee St.

The Felton Public Library was located at 6299 Gushee St., in a 1,250 square feet (116 m^{2}) building that had originally been a church, the Felton Presbyterian Church, from 1956 to 2019. The new Felton Public Library building, next to the Felton post office on Gushee Street, was scheduled to open in February 2020.

In November 2019, library operations at the former building were permanently closed.

The new library building, less than a quarter mile away, opened on February 22, 2020.
