= Ahlgren Vineyard =

Vineyard and winery in California, U.S.

Coordinates: 37.2145°N 122.1440°W

- Location: Boulder Creek, California
- Appellation: Santa Cruz Mountains AVA
- Founded: 1976
- Key people: Dexter & Valerie Ahlgren; owners
- Cases/yr: 2,500
- Varietals: Chardonnay, Semillon, Cabernet Sauvignon, Cabernet Franc, Merlot, Syrah, Pinot noir, Nebbiolo
- Distribution: International
- Tasting: Open to the public
- Website: http://www.ahlgrenvineyard.com/

Ahlgren Vineyard was a vineyard and winery located in the Santa Cruz Mountains AVA, in Boulder Creek, California, United States. Founded in 1976 by Dexter and Valerie Ahlgren, they produced 2,500-3,000 cases a year until their closure in 2016. The winery was located in the cellar of the Ahlgren's home. Ahlgren Vineyard used hands on, traditional methods of winemaking to create wine varietals including Sémillon, Chardonnay, Cabernet Sauvignon, Merlot, Cabernet Franc, Zinfandel, Nebbiolo, Pinot noir, and Syrah. Their grapes came from the Santa Cruz Mountains, Livermoore Valley, and Monterey. In 2000 Dexter Ahlgren suffered from a stroke, and the couples daughter, Beth Ahlgren, took over as winemaker. Dexter recovered enough to allow him to take part in the winemaking process. The winery closed in 2016.
