= Loch Lomond (California) =

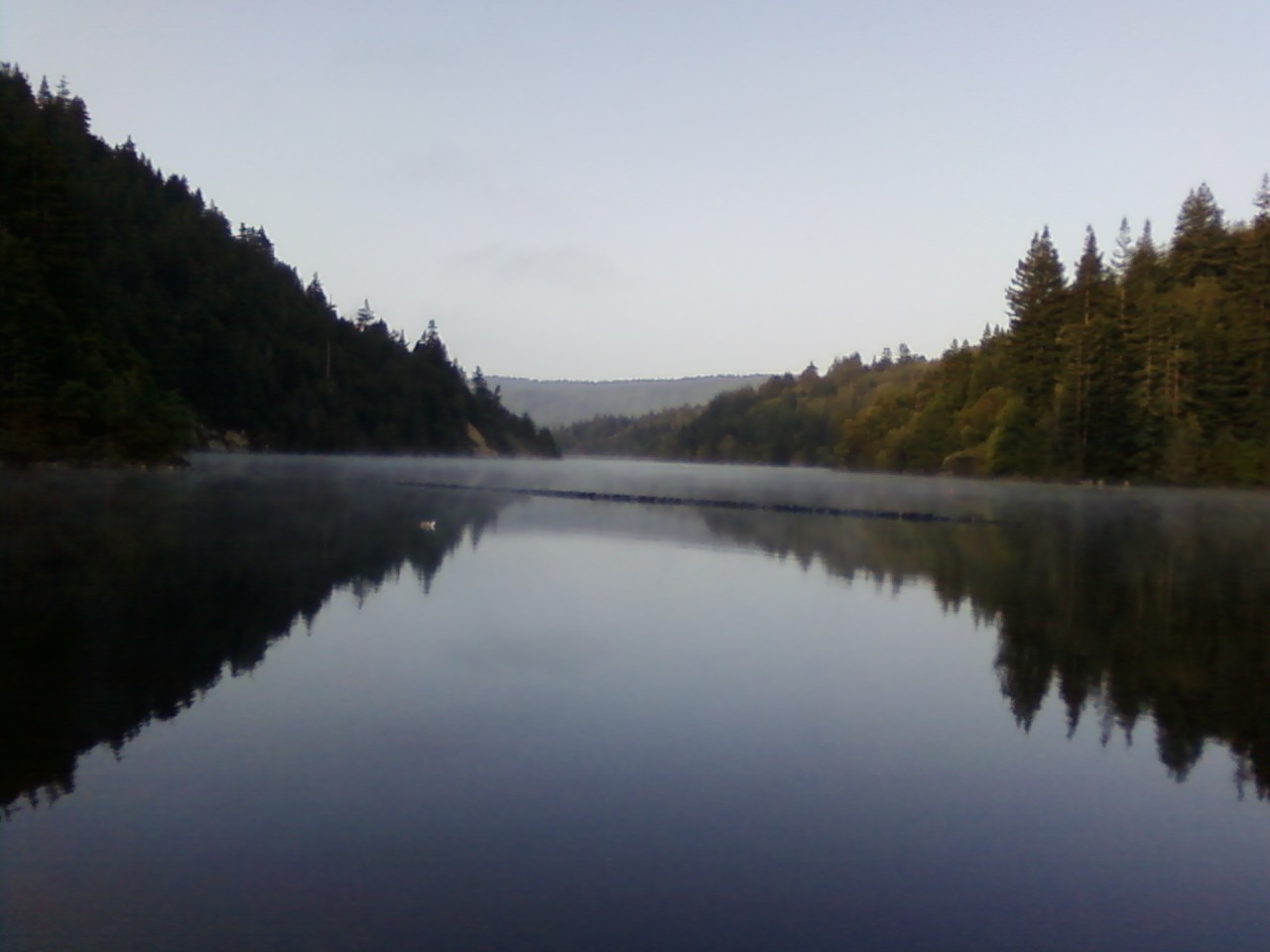

- Location within California Location within the United States
- Location: Santa Cruz Mountains; Santa Cruz County, California
- Coordinates: 37°06′11″N 122°04′24″W
- Type: Reservoir
- Primary inflows: Newell Creek
- Primary outflows: Newell Creek
- Basin countries: United States
- Max. length: 3 mi (4.8 km)
- Max. width: 0.25 mi (0.40 km)
- Surface area: 175 acres (71 ha)
- Max. depth: 150 ft (46 m)
- Water volume: 9,200 acre⋅ft (11,300,000 m^{3})
- Surface elevation: 574 ft (175 m)
- References: U.S. Geological Survey Geographic Names Information System: Loch Lomond

Loch Lomond is a reservoir in the Santa Cruz Mountains near Lompico in Santa Cruz County, California. Part of the Santa Cruz Water Department system, it was created by building the Newell Creek Dam across Newell Creek – a tributary of the San Lorenzo River. The dam is an earth-fill barricade, measuring 190 ft (58 m) by 750 ft (230 m). It was financed by bond issuance, and completed in the Fall of 1960; impounded water first ran over the spillway in March 1963.

The reservoir is 175 acres (71 ha). It is 2.5 mi (4.0 km) long, 0.25 mi (0.40 km) wide, approximately 150 ft (46 m) deep, with a 9,200 acre⋅ft (11,300,000 m^{3}) capacity. It provides a main portion of the drinking water supply for the city of Santa Cruz, California and also supplies other nearby county areas. Boating, fishing, picnicking and hiking take place at the reservoir. No daily private boat launching is permitted. No swimming is allowed. The reservoir has a boat rental and snack shop and is open every day from March 1 to September 15, and weekends only from Labor Day to October 17.

Surrounding the reservoir is the Loch Lomond Recreation Area, which is owned and operated by the City of Santa Cruz Water Department. It has hiking trails, picnic areas, and boating access.

== See also ==
- List of lakes of California
