= Paco Ahlgren =

American novelist

- Born: November 19, 1968 (age 57); El Paso, Texas
- Occupations: Musician; author; journalist
- Writing career
- Notable awards: Next Generation Indie Book Award; INDIEFAB Book of the Year Award, Silver
- Website: pacoahlgren.com

Paco Ahlgren (born Frank Richard Ahlgren, III on November 19, 1968) is an American writer, musician, and financial journalist. His novel, Discipline, was published in July 2007 by Greenleaf Book Group; it went on to receive three awards for commercial fiction.

== Work ==
Ahlgren began his musical career in 1987 as a teenager in Tuscaloosa, Alabama, playing shows with his band The Bentley Tock. The band's first single, She, was the most requested song on WVUA-FM in 1988. In 1989, they played a well-received show at the University of Alabama's Riverside Amphitheater and recorded a 6-song EP, and then a full-length album in 1992 entitled Able.

Ahlgren's novel, Discipline, received a favorable review from Jeffrey Satinover. Discipline also received recommendations from The Midwest Book Review, The Houston Press and the Durango Herald. It was selected as a 2007 Booksense Notable by the American Booksellers Association. In 2009, it was optioned to become a motion picture, by David Permut and Steve Jones.

Ahlgren is a contributing writer to Seeking Alpha.Legal Issues

== Family ==
Ahlgren is the grandson of Frank Ahlgren Sr., editor of Memphis daily newspaper The Commercial Appeal for 32 years, and a University of Tennessee Board of Trustees member for 27 years. Ahlgren Sr. was involved in developing the university's School of Journalism in 1957, and was inducted into the Tennessee Newspaper Hall of Fame in November 2007.
