= San Lorenzo Valley =

Valley in Santa Cruz County, California

Coordinates: 37.0967°N 122.0962°W

The San Lorenzo Valley is in the Santa Cruz Mountains in Santa Cruz County, California and was once a logging industry center of California especially during the rebuilding of San Francisco after the 1906 earthquake. Now it is home to over 35,000 people. Home to millions of Sequoia sempervirens, or redwood trees, the valley includes the census designated places of Ben Lomond, Felton, Brookdale and Boulder Creek, which lie along the winding, two-lane and outer areas of the valley and Highway 9.

The San Lorenzo River starts at its headwaters above Boulder Creek, it runs through the valley on its way to the city of Santa Cruz, where it then flows into the Monterey Bay and the Pacific Ocean and also supplies the city of Santa Cruz with its drinking water. Much of the river valley is rural and wooded and other areas have neighborhoods and schools, and shopping areas. At its northern end, it abuts Big Basin Redwoods State Park and Castle Rock State Park; toward the southern end is Henry Cowell Redwoods State Park.
