= Ben Lomond, California =

Census-designated place in Santa Cruz County, California, United States

Ben Lomond
- census-designated place
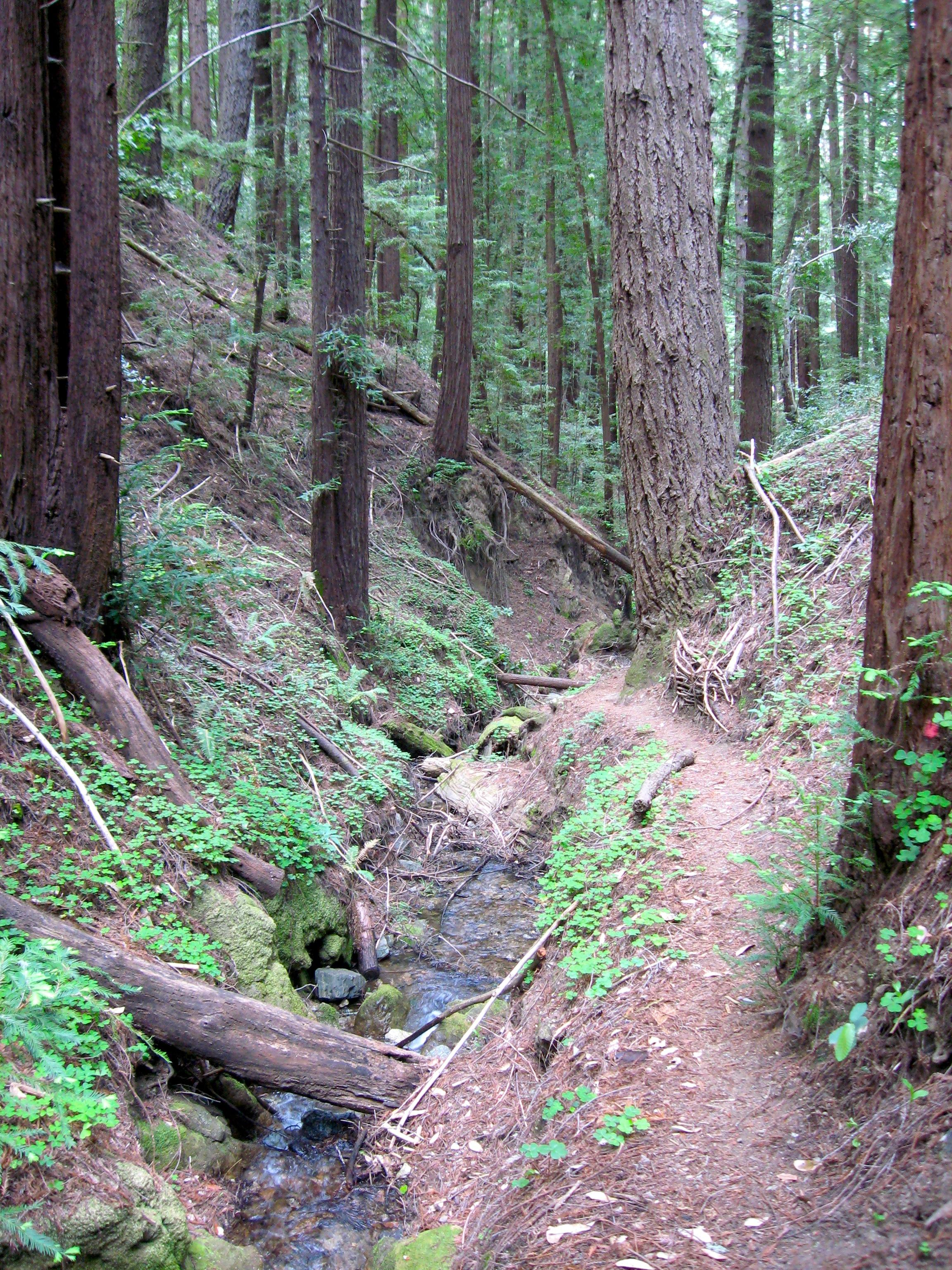
- Marshall Creek, at The Quaker Center in Ben Lomond

- Location in Santa Cruz County and the state of California

- Location in the United States
- Coordinates: 37°4′58″N 122°5′1″W
- Country: United States
- State: California
- County: Santa Cruz

Area
  - Total: 8.37 sq mi (21.67 km^{2})
  - Land: 8.37 sq mi (21.67 km^{2})
  - Water: 0 sq mi (0.00 km^{2}) 0%
- Elevation: 331 ft (101 m)

Population (2020)
  - Total: 6,337
  - Density: 757.2/sq mi (292.37/km^{2})
- Time zone: UTC−8 (PST)
  - Summer (DST): UTC−7 (PDT)
- ZIP Code: 95005
- Area code: 831
- FIPS code: 06-05332
- GNIS feature ID: 1655826

Ben Lomond is a census-designated place (CDP) in Santa Cruz County, California, United States, and also the name of the mountain to the west. The CDP includes the communities of Glen Arbor and Brackney. The population was 6,337 at the 2020 census.

== History ==
The nearby Ben Lomond Mountain was named after the mountain in Scotland by a Scottish immigrant. John Burns settled on the west side of the ridge in 1851. Burns became one of the first vintners in the Santa Cruz Mountains, and is usually also credited with naming the community of Bonny Doon. The San Lorenzo River watershed contains extensive forests of Coast redwood, and was an early center of the logging/lumber industry in Santa Cruz County. The community was originally known as Pacific Mills, after a sawmill operation located there. When, in 1887, the community applied for a U.S. Post Office, residents voted to adopt the name of the mountain.

Alba School, a one-room schoolhouse, was constructed in 1895 and was in use until 1940; it later served as a library and a community center. It was destroyed in the CZU Lightning Complex fires in August 2020.

== Geography ==
Ben Lomond is located on State Highway 9, about 12 miles (19 km) from Santa Cruz and 34 miles (55 km) from San Jose (the nearest major city) at 37°5′24″N 122°5′24″W (37.09, -122.09). According to the United States Census Bureau, the CDP has a total area of 8.4 square miles (22 km^{2}), all land. The San Lorenzo River runs through the CDP, in what is known locally as the San Lorenzo Valley, which runs southeast to northwest to the east of Ben Lomond Mountain (in actuality a long ridge whose highest point has an elevation of 2,660 feet [810 m]).

Northeast of Ben Lomond is Loch Lomond, a reservoir built on Newell Creek and named after the original Loch Lomond in Scotland.

== Climate ==
The National Weather Service has kept weather records for Ben Lomond since 1937. The Western Climate Center reports that Ben Lomond has an average annual rainfall of 49.63 inches (1,261 mm) and an average annual snowfall of 0.1 inches (0.25 cm)

The surrounding mountains and hills trapping heat allow for the summers to become considerably warmer than the surrounding locations despite the area being near the bay and ocean. As a result, summer highs have averages near 90 °F (32 °C) and can even reach more than 100 °F (38 °C). In addition, frost in winter nights are more common than the surrounding areas as the higher elevation and lack of a maritime effect allow for cooler overnight temperatures to occur.

The record high temperature was 121 °F (49 °C) on September 6, 2020, and the record low temperature was 15 °F (−9 °C) on December 22, 1990. There are an average of 53.6 days annually with highs of 90 °F (32 °C) or higher and 36.6 days with lows of 32 °F (0 °C) or lower.

The wettest year was 1983, with 100.37 inches (2,549 mm) of precipitation and the driest year was 2013, with 7.71 inches (196 mm). The most precipitation in one month was 35.77 inches (909 mm) in December 1955. The most precipitation in 24 hours was 11.47 inches (291 mm) on January 4, 1982. There are an average of 76 days with measurable precipitation. The heaviest 24-hour snowfall was 2.0 inches (5.1 cm) on January 21, 1962.

Climate data for Ben Lomond, California, 1991–2020 normals, extremes 1937–present
| Month | Jan | Feb | Mar | Apr | May | Jun | Jul | Aug | Sep | Oct | Nov | Dec | Year |
|---|---|---|---|---|---|---|---|---|---|---|---|---|---|
| Record high °F (°C) | 87 (31) | 91 (33) | 94 (34) | 100 (38) | 106 (41) | 113 (45) | 113 (45) | 113 (45) | 121 (49) | 112 (44) | 96 (36) | 85 (29) | 121 (49) |
| Mean maximum °F (°C) | 75.6 (24.2) | 79.2 (26.2) | 84.2 (29.0) | 91.3 (32.9) | 94.3 (34.6) | 100.1 (37.8) | 101.9 (38.8) | 102.7 (39.3) | 103.8 (39.9) | 97.9 (36.6) | 86.1 (30.1) | 74.1 (23.4) | 107.5 (41.9) |
| Mean daily maximum °F (°C) | 64.6 (18.1) | 66.9 (19.4) | 70.6 (21.4) | 75.0 (23.9) | 79.6 (26.4) | 85.5 (29.7) | 87.9 (31.1) | 89.5 (31.9) | 88.6 (31.4) | 83.0 (28.3) | 71.3 (21.8) | 63.7 (17.6) | 77.2 (25.1) |
| Daily mean °F (°C) | 51.0 (10.6) | 52.9 (11.6) | 55.6 (13.1) | 58.5 (14.7) | 62.6 (17.0) | 67.1 (19.5) | 69.6 (20.9) | 70.2 (21.2) | 68.7 (20.4) | 63.6 (17.6) | 55.4 (13.0) | 50.2 (10.1) | 60.4 (15.8) |
| Mean daily minimum °F (°C) | 37.4 (3.0) | 38.9 (3.8) | 40.5 (4.7) | 41.9 (5.5) | 45.7 (7.6) | 48.6 (9.2) | 51.2 (10.7) | 51.0 (10.6) | 48.9 (9.4) | 44.2 (6.8) | 39.6 (4.2) | 36.8 (2.7) | 43.7 (6.5) |
| Mean minimum °F (°C) | 26.6 (−3.0) | 28.3 (−2.1) | 30.2 (−1.0) | 32.5 (0.3) | 36.8 (2.7) | 39.9 (4.4) | 43.8 (6.6) | 42.9 (6.1) | 39.5 (4.2) | 34.0 (1.1) | 29.1 (−1.6) | 25.9 (−3.4) | 24.3 (−4.3) |
| Record low °F (°C) | 18 (−8) | 20 (−7) | 25 (−4) | 25 (−4) | 29 (−2) | 31 (−1) | 39 (4) | 31 (−1) | 28 (−2) | 26 (−3) | 25 (−4) | 15 (−9) | 15 (−9) |
| Average precipitation inches (mm) | 10.42 (265) | 9.68 (246) | 7.00 (178) | 3.28 (83) | 1.24 (31) | 0.24 (6.1) | 0.01 (0.25) | 0.04 (1.0) | 0.12 (3.0) | 2.17 (55) | 5.00 (127) | 10.43 (265) | 49.63 (1,261) |
| Average snowfall inches (cm) | 0.0 (0.0) | 0.1 (0.25) | 0.0 (0.0) | 0.0 (0.0) | 0.0 (0.0) | 0.0 (0.0) | 0.0 (0.0) | 0.0 (0.0) | 0.0 (0.0) | 0.0 (0.0) | 0.0 (0.0) | 0.0 (0.0) | 0.1 (0.25) |
| Average precipitation days (≥ 0.01 in) | 12.2 | 12.1 | 10.0 | 6.8 | 4.1 | 1.5 | 0.3 | 0.6 | 1.1 | 3.6 | 7.6 | 12.3 | 72.2 |
| Average snowy days (≥ 0.1 in) | 0.0 | 0.1 | 0.0 | 0.0 | 0.0 | 0.0 | 0.0 | 0.0 | 0.0 | 0.0 | 0.0 | 0.0 | 0.1 |
Source 1: NOAA
Source 2: National Weather Service

== Demographics ==
Historical population
| Census | Pop. | Note | %± |
|---|---|---|---|
| 1970 | 2,793 | | — |
| 1980 | 7,238 | | 159.1% |
| 1990 | 7,884 | | 8.9% |
| 2000 | 2,364 | | −70.0% |
| 2010 | 6,234 | | 163.7% |
| 2020 | 6,337 | | 1.7% |
U.S. Decennial Census; 1860–1870 1880-1890; 1900 1910 1920; 1930 1940 1950; 1960 1970 1980; 1990 2000 2010; 2020

Ben Lomond first appeared as an unincorporated community in the 1970 U.S. census; and as a census-designated place in the 1980 United States census.

=== Racial and ethnic composition ===
Ben Lomond Valley CDP, California – Racial and ethnic composition Note: the US Census treats Hispanic/Latino as an ethnic category. This table excludes Latinos from the racial categories and assigns them to a separate category. Hispanics/Latinos may be of any race.
| Race / Ethnicity (NH = Non-Hispanic) | Pop 2000 | Pop 2010 | Pop 2020 | % 2000 | % 2010 | % 2020 |
|---|---|---|---|---|---|---|
| White alone (NH) | 2,072 | 5,374 | 5,087 | 87.65% | 86.20% | 80.27% |
| Black or African American alone (NH) | 3 | 30 | 29 | 0.13% | 0.48% | 0.46% |
| Native American or Alaska Native alone (NH) | 12 | 35 | 33 | 0.51% | 0.56% | 0.52% |
| Asian alone (NH) | 37 | 68 | 86 | 1.57% | 1.09% | 1.36% |
| Native Hawaiian or Pacific Islander alone (NH) | 3 | 11 | 4 | 0.13% | 0.18% | 0.06% |
| Other race alone (NH) | 15 | 17 | 51 | 0.63% | 0.27% | 0.80% |
| Mixed race or Multiracial (NH) | 70 | 184 | 373 | 2.96% | 2.95% | 5.89% |
| Hispanic or Latino (any race) | 152 | 515 | 674 | 6.43% | 8.26% | 10.64% |
| Total | 2,364 | 6,234 | 6,337 | 100.00% | 100.00% | 100.00% |

=== 2020 census ===
As of the 2020 census, Ben Lomond had a population of 6,337. The population density was 757.2 inhabitants per square mile (292.4/km^{2}). The median age was 45.8 years. For every 100 females, there were 99.3 males, and for every 100 females age 18 and over, there were 97.3 males age 18 and over.

The age distribution was 18.1% under the age of 18, 6.4% aged 18 to 24, 24.2% aged 25 to 44, 30.9% aged 45 to 64, and 20.4% who were 65 years of age or older.

The census reported that 99.0% of the population lived in households, 1.0% lived in non-institutionalized group quarters, and no one was institutionalized. 86.7% of residents lived in urban areas, while 13.3% lived in rural areas.

There were 2,492 households, out of which 27.1% included children under the age of 18. Of all households, 53.0% were married-couple households, 7.9% were cohabiting couple households, 20.9% had a female householder with no partner present, and 18.1% had a male householder with no partner present. 22.5% of households were one person, and 9.5% were one person aged 65 or older. The average household size was 2.52. There were 1,669 families (67.0% of all households).

There were 2,620 housing units at an average density of 313.1 units per square mile (120.9 units/km^{2}). Of these units, 95.1% were occupied and 4.9% were vacant; the homeowner vacancy rate was 0.7% and the rental vacancy rate was 2.9%. Of occupied units, 74.7% were owner-occupied and 25.3% were occupied by renters.

=== 2023 estimates ===
In 2023, the US Census Bureau estimated that 13.4% of the population were foreign-born. Of all people aged 5 or older, 80.5% spoke only English at home, 3.5% spoke Spanish, 14.0% spoke other Indo-European languages, 1.1% spoke Asian or Pacific Islander languages, and 1.0% spoke other languages. Of those aged 25 or older, 97.2% were high school graduates and 46.2% had a bachelor's degree.

The median household income was $120,977, and the per capita income was $62,910. About 0.0% of families and 4.2% of the population were below the poverty line.

== Business ==
Love Creek is on the east side of the business district of Ben Lomond, along Highway 9.

== Government ==
In the California State Legislature, Ben Lomond is in the 17th senatorial district, represented by Democrat John Laird, and in the 28th Assembly district, represented by Democrat Gail Pellerin.

In the United States House of Representatives, Ben Lomond is in California's 19th congressional district, represented by Democrat Jimmy Panetta.

== Transportation ==
Santa Cruz Metro Transit Bus Route 35 and 35E goes through Ben Lomond.

== Notable people ==
- Guillermo Wagner Granizo (1923–1995) ceramic tile muralist, lived in Ben Lomond from the 1970s until 1980.
- Jim Jeffries (1875–1953), boxer, trained in the 1940s at the now defunct Wagon Wheel Bar and Restaurant.
