= Tender (rail) =

Steam locomotive fuel and water tank container

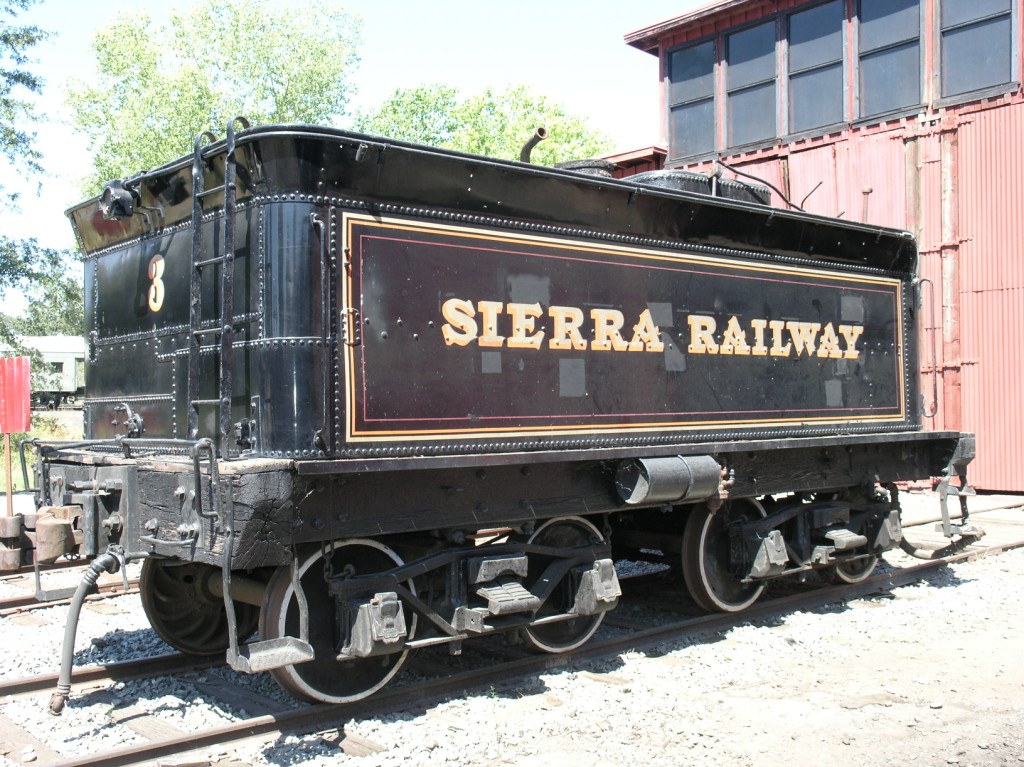
Sierra Railway No. 3 tender

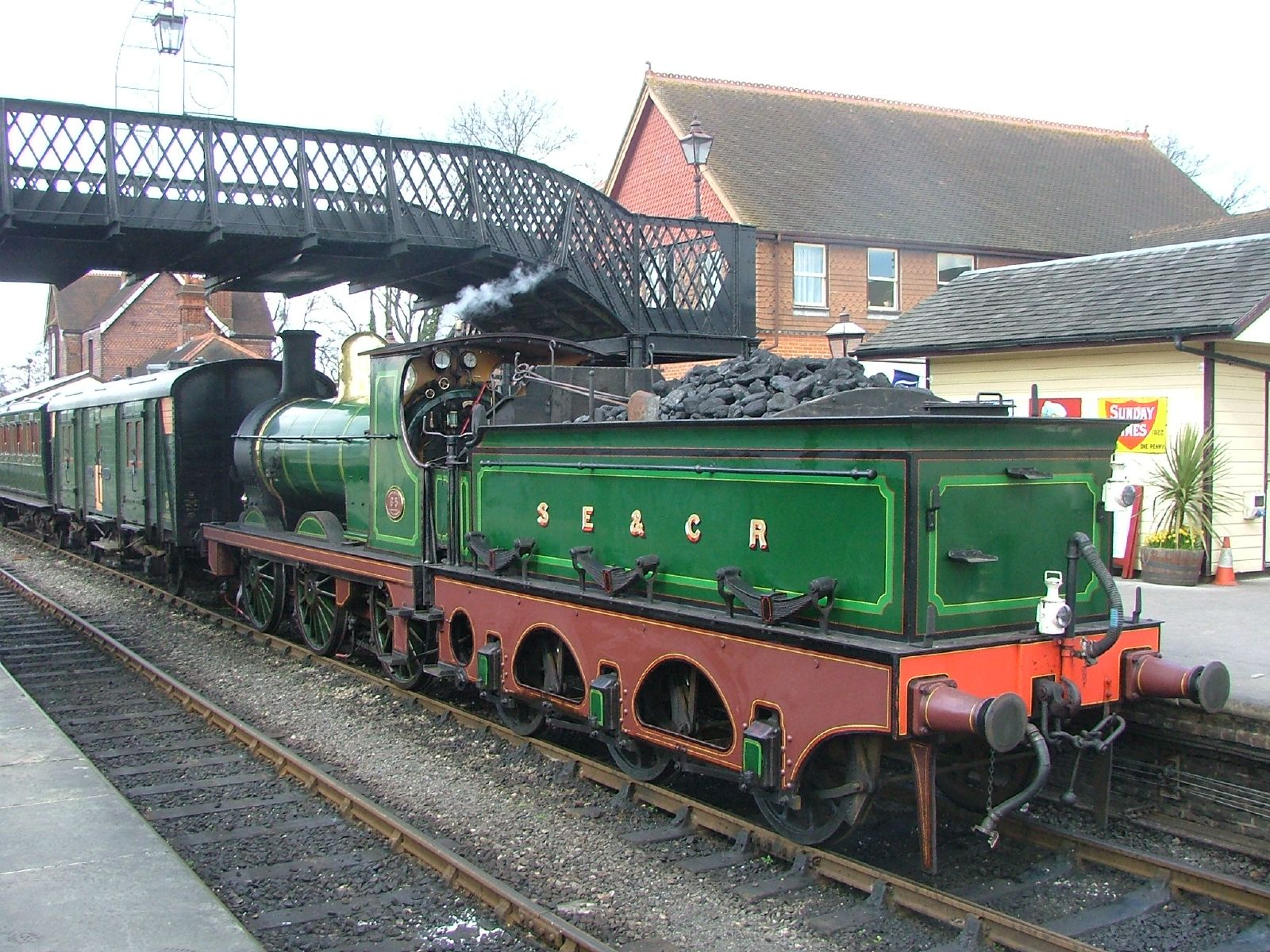
A British SE&CR O1 class runs tender-first at the Bluebell Railway

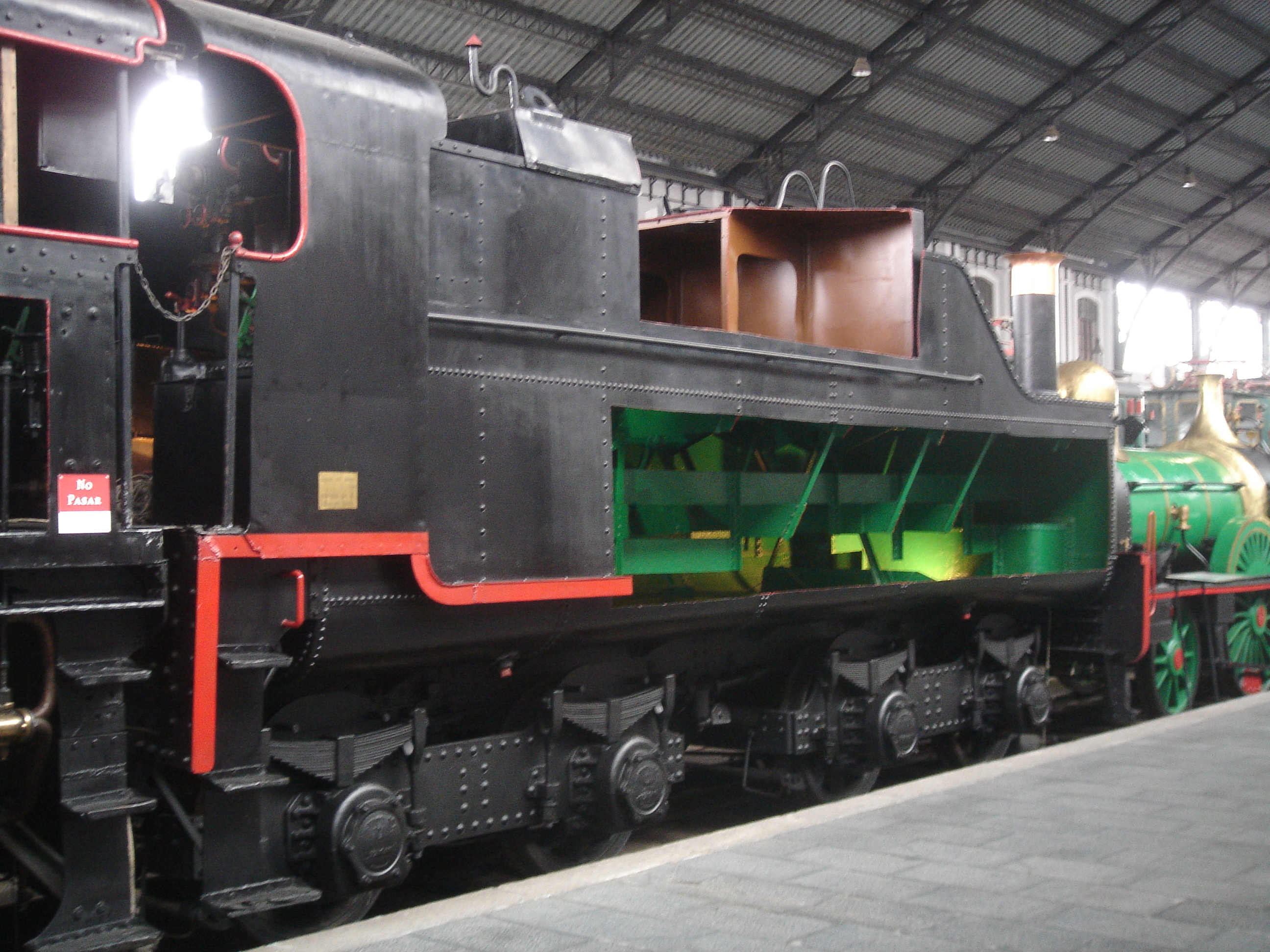
Cutaway cross section showing a Spanish tender designed for fuel oil. Green areas hold water and brown areas hold fuel oil. There is a special arrangement to prevent sloshing around during the movement of the train.

A tender is a special rail vehicle hauled by a steam locomotive containing its fuel (wood, coal, oil or torrefied biomass) and water. Steam locomotives consume large quantities of water compared to the quantity of fuel, so their tenders are necessary to keep them running over long distances. A locomotive that pulls a tender is called either a tender locomotive or a tender engine. Locomotives that do not have tenders and carry all their fuel and water on board are called tank locomotives.

A corridor tender is a locomotive tender with a passageway to one side, allowing crew changes on the fly.

A brake tender is a tender that is heavy and used (primarily) to provide greater braking efficiency.

== General functions ==
The largest steam locomotives are semi-permanently coupled by a drawbar to a tender that carries the water and fuel. The fuel source used depends on what is economically available locally. In the UK and parts of Europe, a plentiful supply of coal made this the obvious choice from the earliest days of the steam engine. Until around 1850 in the United States, the vast majority of locomotives burned wood until most of the eastern forests were cleared. Subsequently, coal burning became more widespread, and wood burners were restricted to rural and logging districts.

=== Water supply ===
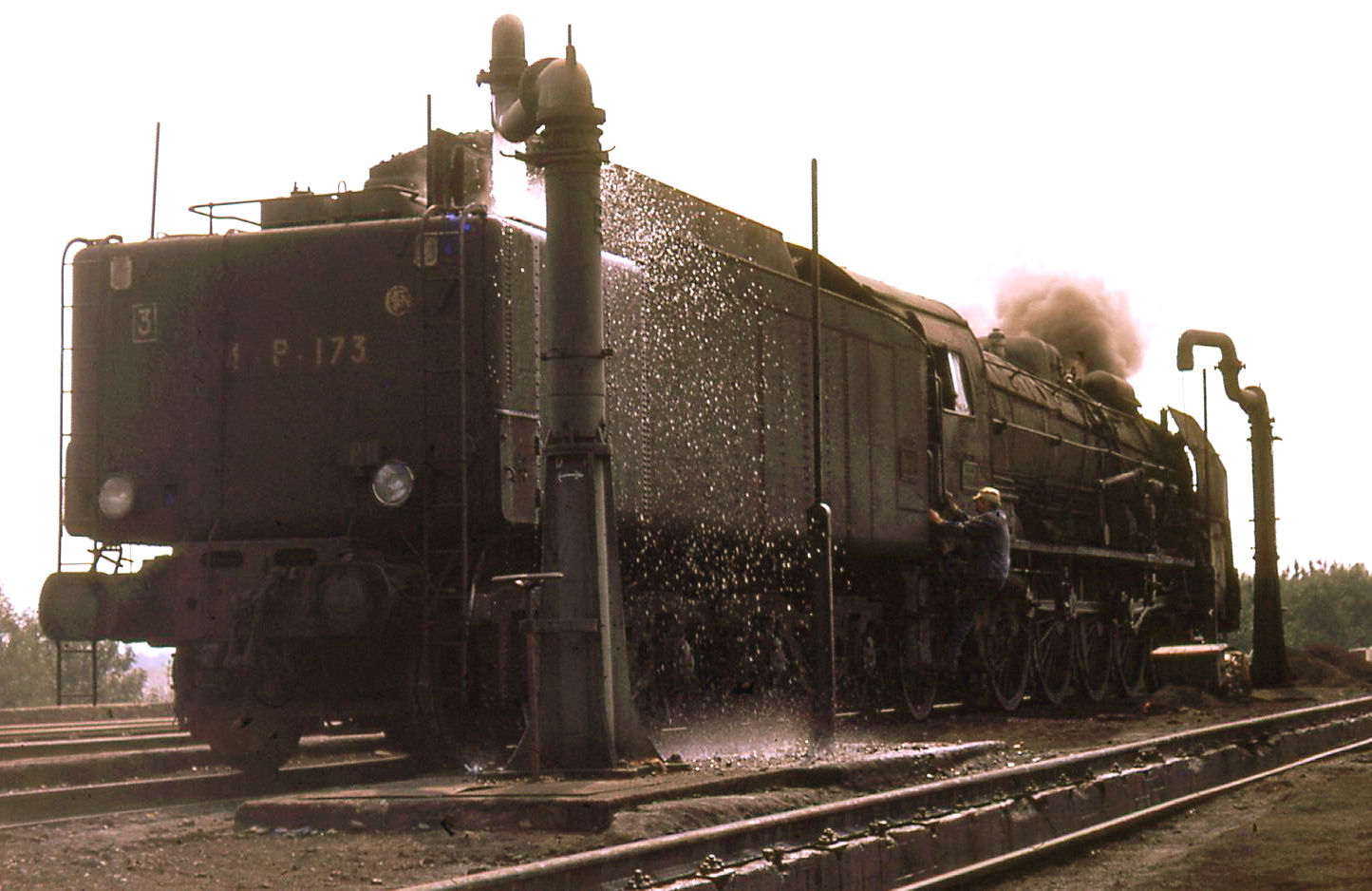
SNCF 241P Class with 34P bogie tender, being filled from a water crane (Nantes Blotterau, France, August 1969)

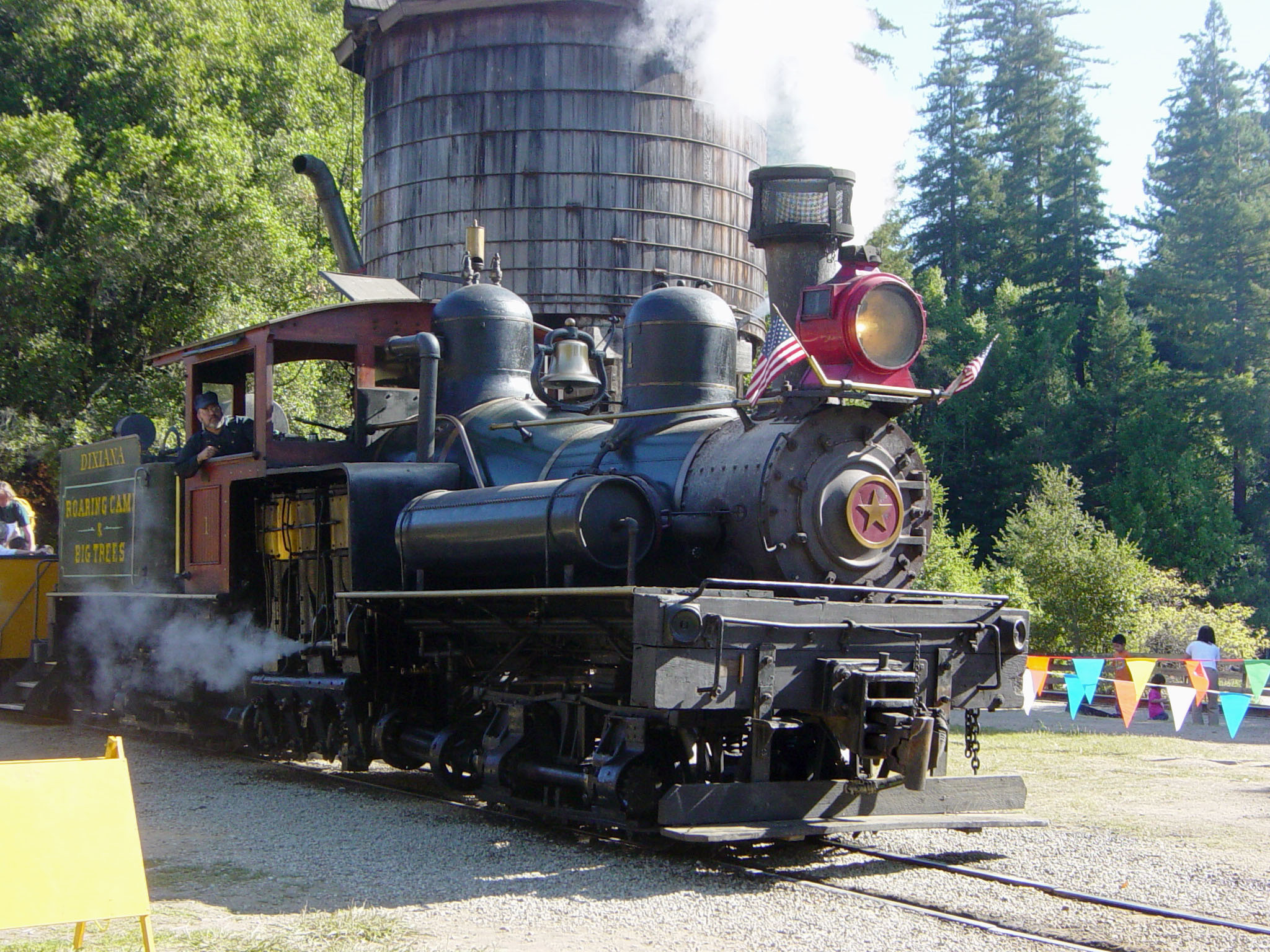
Shay locomotive Dixiana at the Roaring Camp and Big Trees Narrow Gauge Railroad, Felton, California, with wooden water tower and extendable spigot visible in the background

By the mid-1800s, most steam locomotive tenders consisted of a fuel bunker (that held coal or wood) surrounded by a U-shaped (when viewed from the top) water jacket. The overall shape of the tender was usually rectangular. The bunker which held the coal was sloped downwards toward the locomotive providing easier access to the coal. The ratio of water to fuel capacities of tenders was normally based on two water-stops to each fuel stop because water was more readily available than fuel. One pound [0.45 kg] of coal could turn six pounds of water (0.7 gallons) [2.7 kg] to steam. Therefore, tender capacity ratios were normally close to 7 tons (14,000 lb) [6,400 kg] of coal per 10,000 gallons [38,000 L] of water.

The water supply in a tender was replenished at water stops and locomotive depots from a dedicated water tower connected to water cranes or gantries. Refilling the tender is the job of the fireman, who is responsible for maintaining the locomotive's fire, steam pressure, and supply of fuel and water.

Water carried in the tender must be forced into the boiler, to replace that which is consumed during operation. Early engines used pumps driven by the motion of the pistons. Later, steam injectors replaced the pump while some engines used turbopumps.

==== With track pans or water troughs ====
In the UK, the USA and France, water troughs (in the USA, track pans) were provided on some main lines to allow locomotives to replenish their water supply while moving. A "water scoop" was fitted under the tender or the rear water tank in the case of a large tank engine; The fireman remotely lowered the scoop into the trough, the speed of the engine forced the water up into the tank, and the scoop was raised once it was full.

The fuel and water capacities of a tender are usually proportional to the rate at which they are consumed, although there were exceptions. The Pennsylvania Railroad and the New York Central Railroad used track pans on many of their routes, allowing locomotives to pick up water at speed. The result was that the water tanks on these tenders were proportionally much smaller.

In the UK water troughs were used by three of the Big Four railways. The exception was the Southern Railway – mainly because the majority of the Southern's operations were based around short-distance commuter, suburban and rural services with frequent station stops where water could be taken on from water columns. The Southern's decision to electrify its routes into London with a third rail system also made the installation of water troughs impractical. Only on the former London and South Western Railway routes west of Salisbury, where long-distance express trains operated, was the lack of troughs a problem. Rather than install troughs the L&SWR (and the Southern Railway) equipped its express locomotives with special high-capacity tenders with a water capacity of 4,000 gallons (18,200 L) running on a pair of twin-axle bogies. These were known to railwaymen as "water cart" tenders.

=== Condensing tenders ===
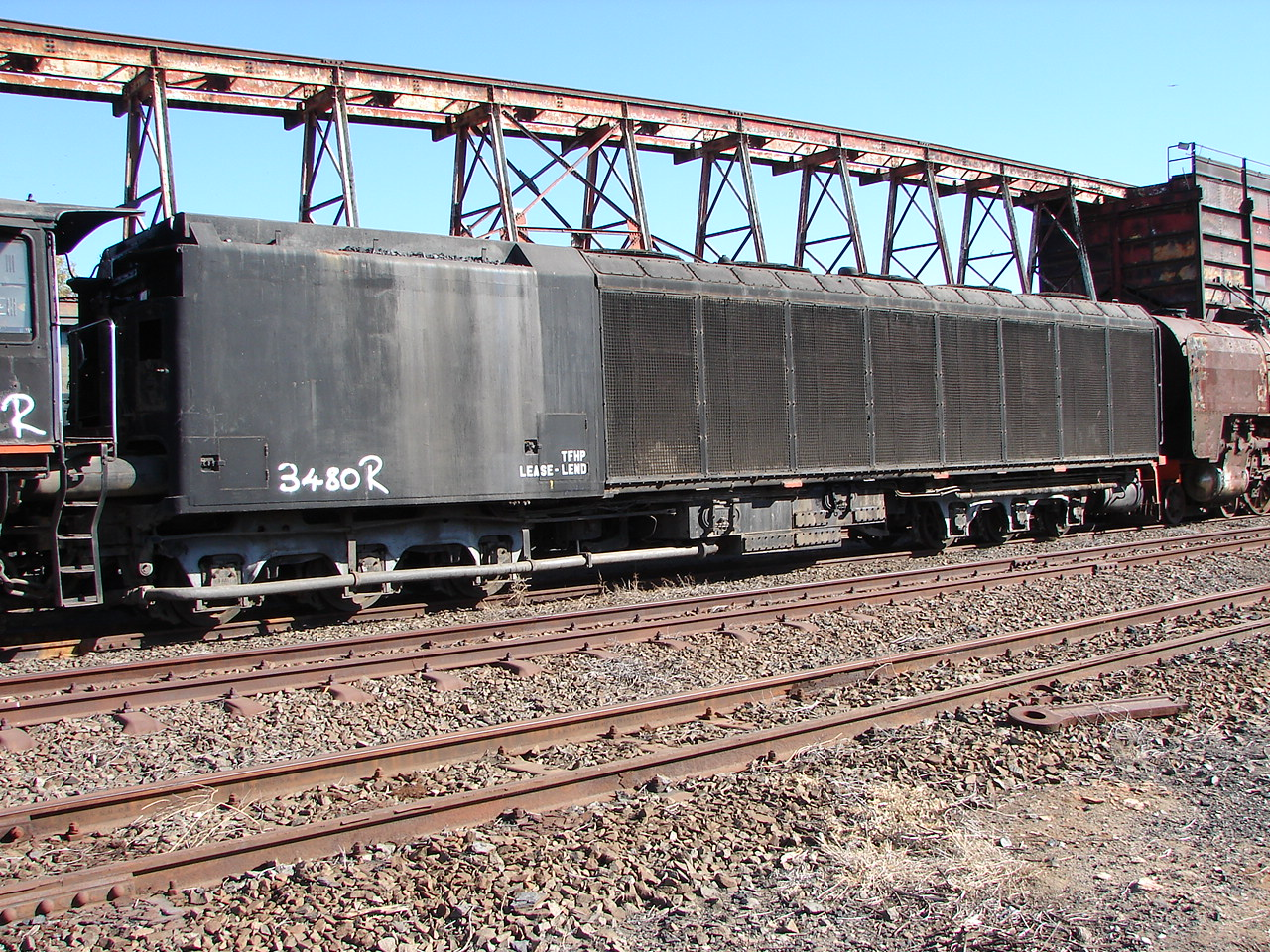
Type CZ condensing tender from South African Railways Class 25 condensing steam locomotive no. 3480, with its large radiator section predominating

Condensing steam locomotives were designed to recycle exhaust steam by condensing it into feed water. The principal benefit is conservation of water, but the thermal efficiency of the engine is also increased, since much of the heat otherwise lost in the exhaust is used to preheat water injected into the boiler. In some cases condensing was employed simply to improve visibility by eliminating clouds of exhaust.

A primitive approach to condensation simply injected the spent steam into the tender tank, relying on the mass of water for cooling. More sophisticated tenders, such as those used in the South African Railways Class 25 locomotives designed for service in the Karoo, replaced most of the water tank with a huge radiator, in which the steam was cooled and condensed. Exhaust steam, after passing through an oil-water separator, was conveyed to the tender, where it powered a low-pressure turbine used to drive the radiator fans. The steam then passed into the radiator. The condensate was injected into the boiler with another turbine-driven pump. This was quite complex machinery, also requiring another turbine in the smokebox to provide the exhaust draft normally obtained by blowing the exhaust steam up the stack. Eventually the SAR examples were converted to conventional locomotives by replacing the radiator with a long water tank.

=== Fuel supply ===
A factor that limits locomotive performance is the rate at which fuel is fed into the fire. Much of the fireman's time is spent throwing wood or shoveling coal into the firebox of the locomotive to maintain constant steam pressure. In the early 20th century some locomotives became so large that the fireman could not shovel coal fast enough. Consequently, in the United States, various steam-powered mechanical stokers (typically using an auger feed between the fuel bunker and the firebox) became standard equipment and were adopted elsewhere, including Australia and South Africa.

== Tender design variants ==
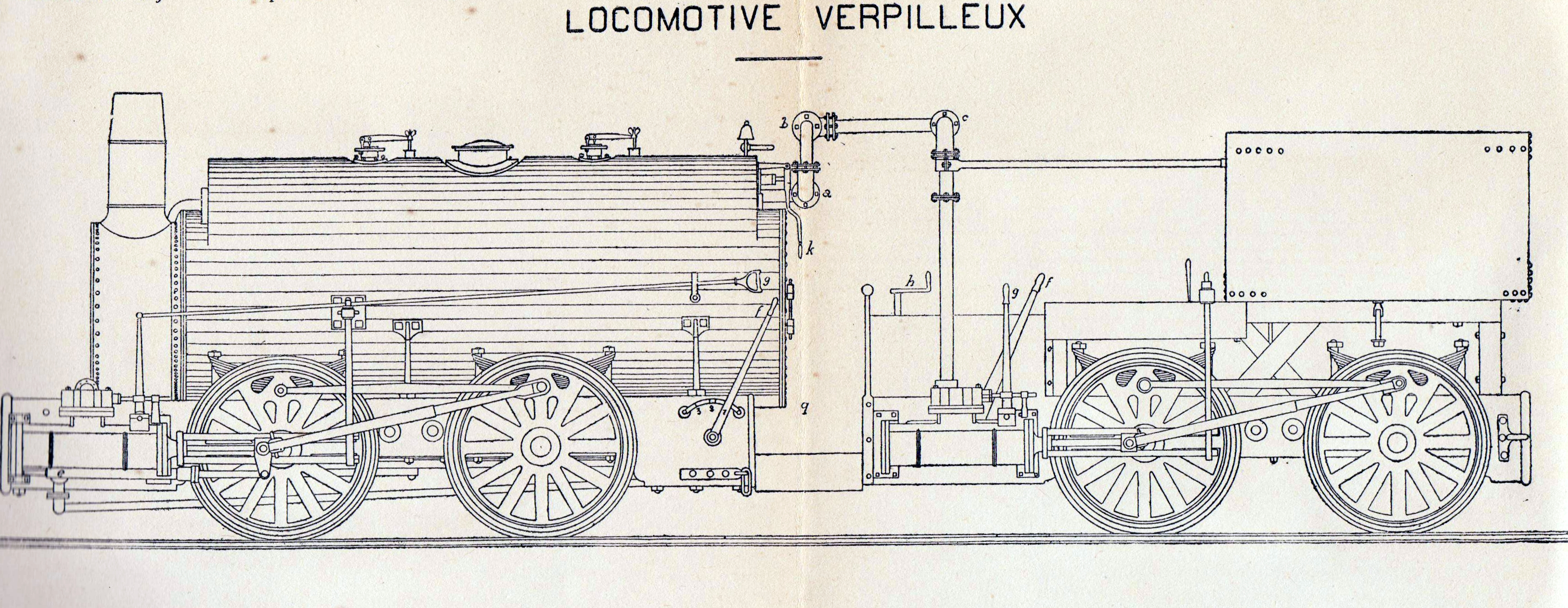
A locomotive and tender designed by Claude Verpilleux around 1842 for the Saint-Étienne to Lyon railway in France

In the early days of railroading, tenders were rectangular boxes, with a bunker for coal or wood surrounded by a U-shaped water jacket. This form was retained up to the end of steam on many coal-burning engines. Oil-burning engines substituted a fuel tank for the bunker. Variations on this plan were made for operational reasons, in attempts to economize on structure.

=== Vanderbilt ===
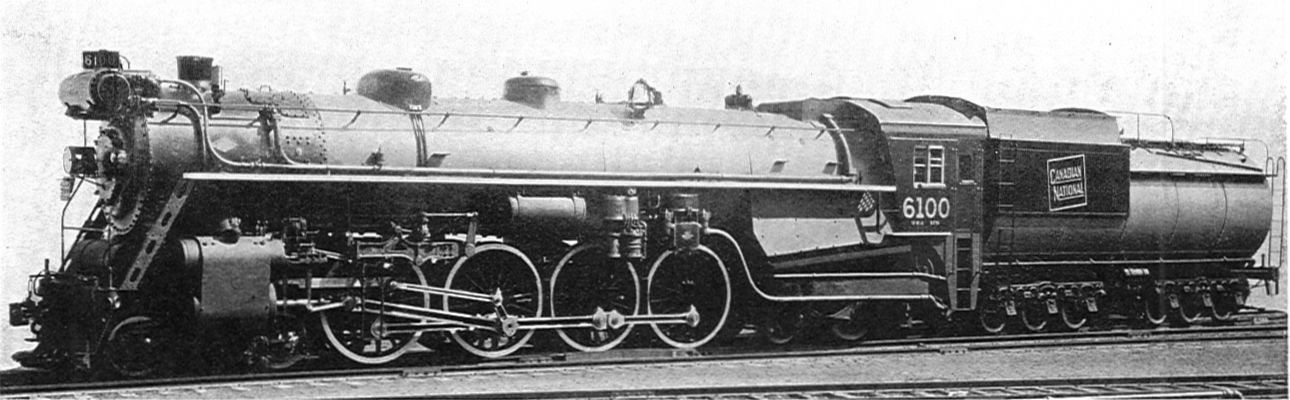
Cylindrical Vanderbilt tender, of the Canadian National

In early 1901, Cornelius Vanderbilt III filed a patent application covering a new type of tender. Vanderbilt was the great-grandson of the founder of the New York Central Railroad; his tender featured a cylindrical body like a tank car with a fuel bunker set into the front end. This design was soon adopted by a number of American railroads with oil-burning and coal-burning locomotives.

Compared to rectangular tenders, cylindrical Vanderbilt tenders were stronger, lighter, and held more fuel in relation to surface area. Railroads who were noted for using Vanderbilt tenders include:

- Baltimore & Ohio
- Canadian National
- Grand Trunk Western
- Great Northern Railway
- Southern Pacific
- Union Pacific
- Hungarian State Railways (MÁV Class 203)
- New Zealand Railways Department (NZR AB class, NZR J class, NZR G class (1928)).
- Nashville, Chattanooga and St. Louis Railway
- Seaboard Air Line Railroad
- South African Railways

=== Whaleback ===
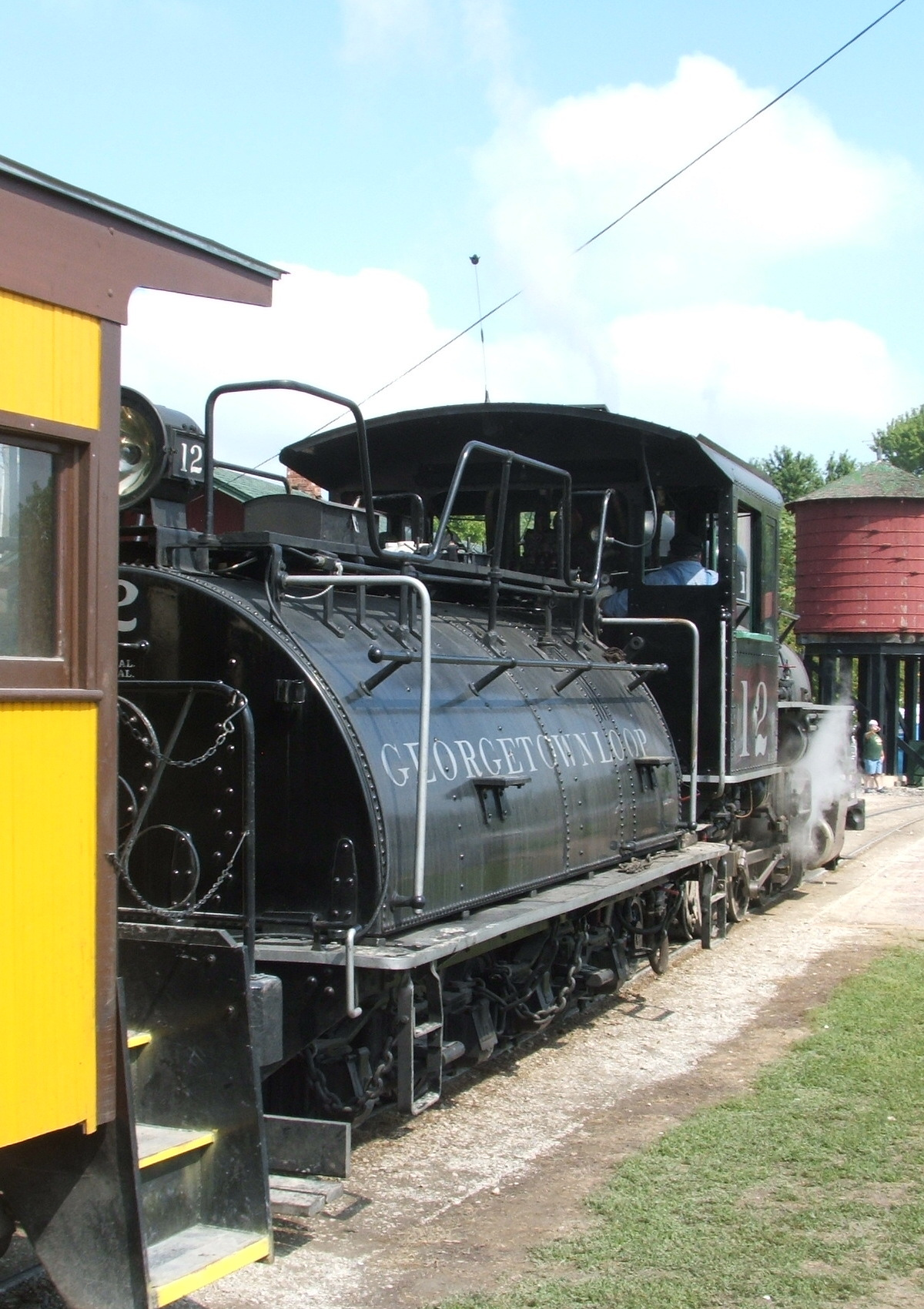
Whaleback tender built for the Kahului Railroad in 1928

A form peculiar to oil-burning engines was the "whaleback" tender (also sometimes called a "turtle-back" or "loaf" tender). This was a roughly half-cylindrical form with the rounded side up; the forward portion of the tank held the oil, while the remainder held the water. This form was particularly associated with the Southern Pacific.

=== Slopeback ===
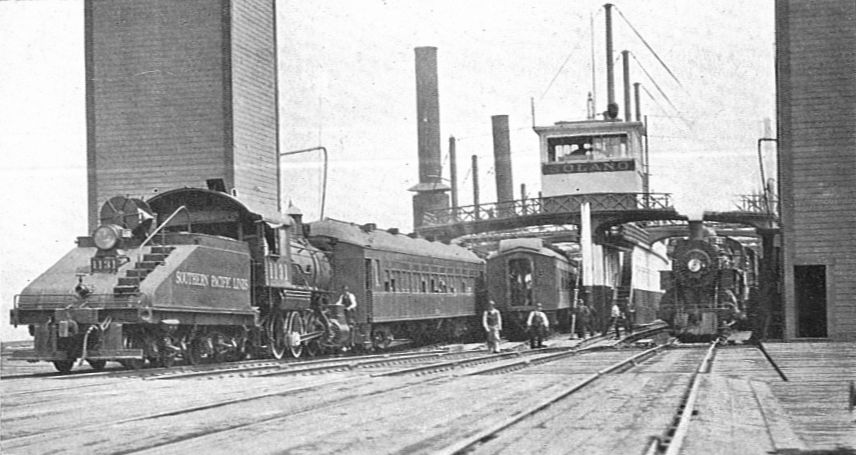
Locomotive with slopeback tender, loading the Sunset Limited onto the train-ferry Solano at Port Costa, San Francisco, Southern Pacific R.R.

In the United States, tenders with sloped backs were often used for locomotives in yard switching service, because they greatly improved the engineer's ability to see behind the locomotive when switching cars. The reduced water capacity was not a problem, as the tender's water tank could be frequently refilled in the rail yard. In the 1880s, numerous locomotive manufacturers were offering tenders with this design on small switcher locomotives.

=== Corridor ===
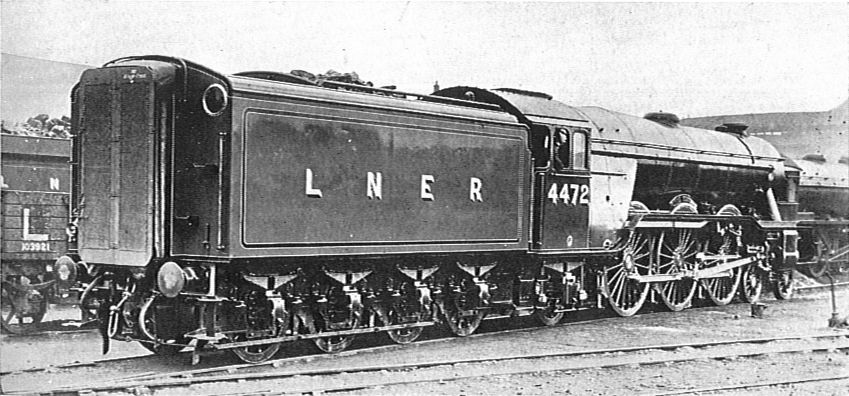
LNER Class A1 No. 4472 Flying Scotsman with corridor tender

For the introduction of the London and North Eastern Railway's non-stop Flying Scotsman service on 1 May 1928, ten special tenders were built with means to reach the locomotive from the train through a narrow passageway inside the tender tank plus a flexible bellows connection linking it with the leading coach. The passageway, which ran along the right-hand side of the tender, was 5 feet (1.52 m) high and 18 inches (0.46 m) wide. Further corridor tenders were built at intervals until 1938, and eventually there were 22; at various times, they were coupled to engines of classes A1, A3, A4 and W1, but by the end of 1948, all were running with class A4 locomotives. Use of the corridor tender for changing crews on the move in an A4 loco is shown in the 1953 British Transport film Elizabethan Express, the name of another London-Edinburgh non-stop train. The London Midland and Scottish Railway also possessed a solitary corridor tender from the late 1940s onwards, built purely for purposes of mobile locomotive testing using a dynamometer car etc. rather than to give any operating advantage in revenue earning service.

=== Water cart ===
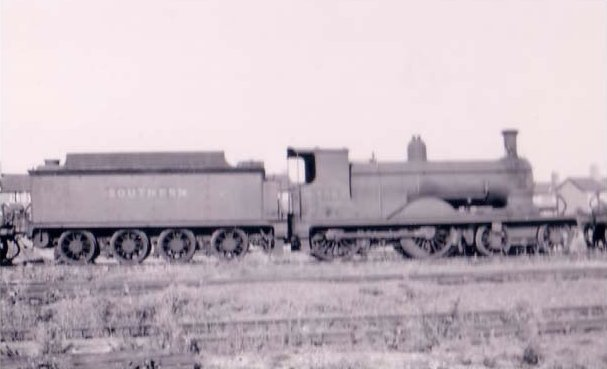
A Southern Railway (Great Britain) locomotive with a "water cart" tender

The water cart was a type of high-capacity tender used by the London and South Western Railway in England. Unlike the usual British six-wheel tender, it was a double-bogie design with inside bearings. This gave it a distinctive appearance because the wheels were very obvious.

=== Canteen ===
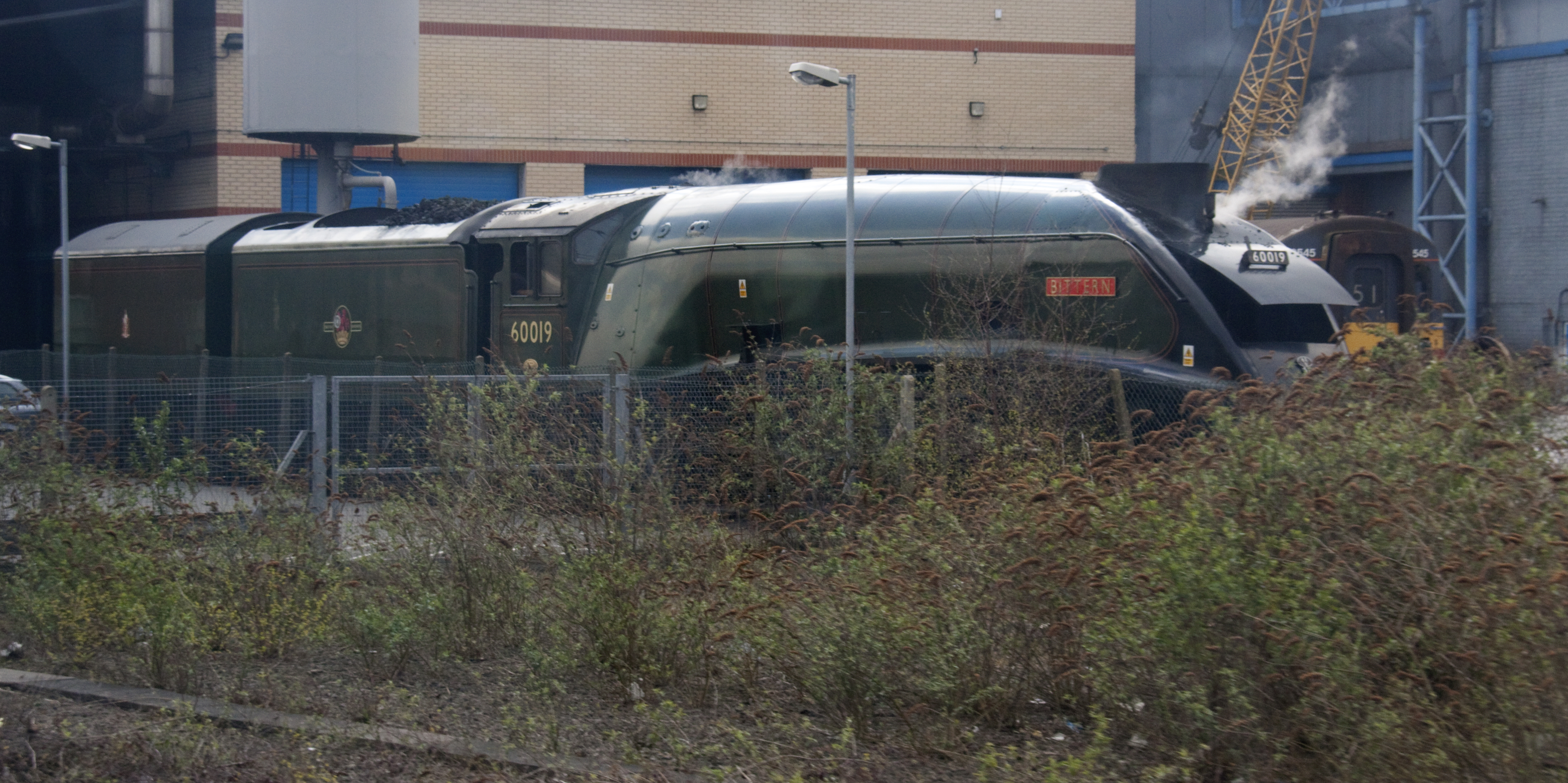
"Bittern" with second tender at York

An additional tender which holds only water is called a "canteen" or "auxiliary tender". During the steam era, these were not frequently used. Water tanks were placed at regular intervals along the track, making a canteen unnecessary in most cases. However, there were times that canteens proved economical. The Norfolk and Western Railway used canteens with its giant 2-8-8-2 Y Class and 2-6-6-4 A Class locomotives on coal trains, timed freights, fast freights, and merchandise freights. Use of the canteen allowed one of the water stops to be skipped, allowing the train to avoid climbing a hill from a dead stop. Currently, the Union Pacific Railroad uses two canteens with its steam locomotives 844 and 4014 on excursion trains. Virtually all the trackside tanks were removed when steam locomotives were retired. Nowadays, fire hydrant hookups are used, which fills the tanks much more slowly. The canteens allow for greater range between stops.

Canteens were also used on the Trans-Australian Railway which crosses the waterless Nullarbor Plain. In New South Wales these vehicles were called "gins", and were used in the predominantly dry western region and on some branch lines. Now prominently use on heritage excursions due to the lack of places with accessible water points. During the catastrophic 2019-2020 bushfire season, as fires devastated towns near the Rail Transport Museum at Thirlmere, south of Sydney, a diesel locomotive from the museum hauled two gins to help replenish firefighting tanker trucks.

In the United Kingdom, a canteen was used on the preserved Flying Scotsman during enthusiast excursions in the late 1960s and early 1970s. The water troughs that had previously supplied long-distance expresses had been removed during dieselisation of the railway network. On 25 July 2009, Bittern made a 188-mile run from King's Cross to York non-stop using a second tender. As railways in Britain tend to be much shorter than those in the US, the canteen was not an economical proposition.

=== Fuel tender ===
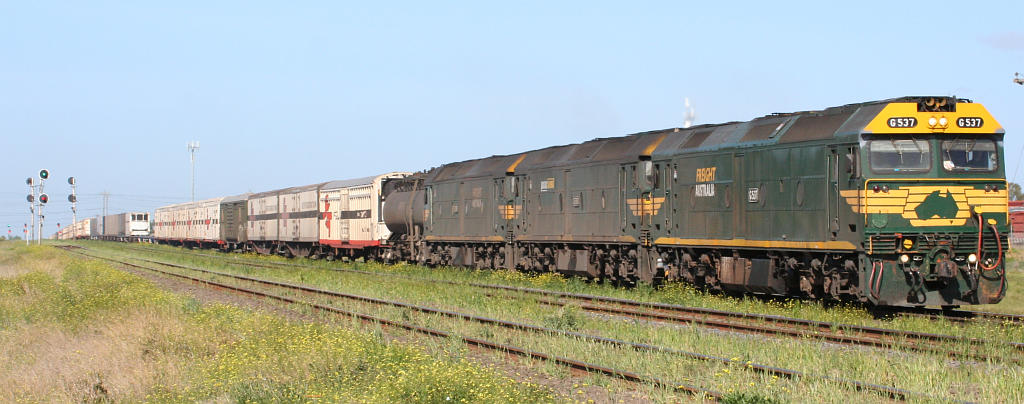
SCT Logistics train with tank car supplying fuel to the locomotives, reducing the number of fuel stops required on the transcontinental journey across Australia

Sometimes a tender will be used for a diesel locomotive. This is typically a tank car with a fuel line that connects to the locomotive and MU connections to allow locomotives behind the tender to be controlled remotely. The Burlington Northern Railroad used fuel tenders in remote territory where fuel was expensive. Diesel fuel could be bought cheaply and loaded into the tender. A common consist was two EMD SD40-2s with a tender between them. Some of the tenders survived the Burlington Northern Santa Fe merger but retain the black and green BN colors. The Southern Pacific Railroad also briefly experimented with fuel tenders for diesels. Some slugs have fuel tanks and serve as fuel tenders for the attached locomotives, especially those that are converted from locomotives that are retired due to worn-out diesels.

The Union Pacific Railroad used fuel tenders on its turbines. These tenders were originally used with steam locomotives, then reworked to hold heavy "Bunker C" fuel oil. Fuel capacity was about 23,000 U.S. gallons (87,000 liters). When the turbines were retired, some of the tenders were reworked to hold water, and employed as canteens for steam locomotives.

Fuel tenders have also been the cause of controversy for railroads, in particular the Soo Line. In the late 1970s, the management of the railroad discovered that it was cheaper for them to fill their fuel tenders at Chicago, and then transport the fuel to Shoreham Wisconsin. Doing this avoided the railroad needing to pay extra taxes on the fuel, and the system was continued until the mid-1980s. When the states of Illinois and Wisconsin caught onto the railroad's actions, legislation was passed which charged the same over the road tax on the fuel movement over rail which was charged for truck drivers. Doing this completely negated the benefit of moving the fuel by way of the tenders, and Soo quietly withdrew the practice.

Tenders have also been developed to carry liquefied natural gas for diesel locomotives converted to run on that fuel.

=== Brake tender ===
On British railways, brake tenders were low, heavy wagons used with early main line diesel locomotives. One or two were coupled in front or behind the locomotive to provide extra braking power when hauling unfitted or partially fitted freight trains (trains formed from wagons not fitted with automatic brakes). They were required as the lighter weight of the new diesel locomotives, compared to steam, meant that they had comparable tractive effort (and thus train hauling capacity) but less braking ability. Originally intended to be used in North East England, where they were usually propelled (pushed) by the locomotive, and later used in other regions. On the Southern Region they were normally hauled behind the locomotive.

The tender took the form of a hollow box, low enough to avoid obscuring the driver's view when pushed. The body was carried on a pair of former carriage bogies, which provided the automatic brakes. The body was filled with scrap steel to raise the weight of the vehicle to 35 1/2–37 1/2 tons; consequently increasing the available brake force. Four lamp brackets were provided at each end to display locomotive headcode discs describing the class of train – when propelled, the tender obscured the front of the locomotive, and hence the headcode.

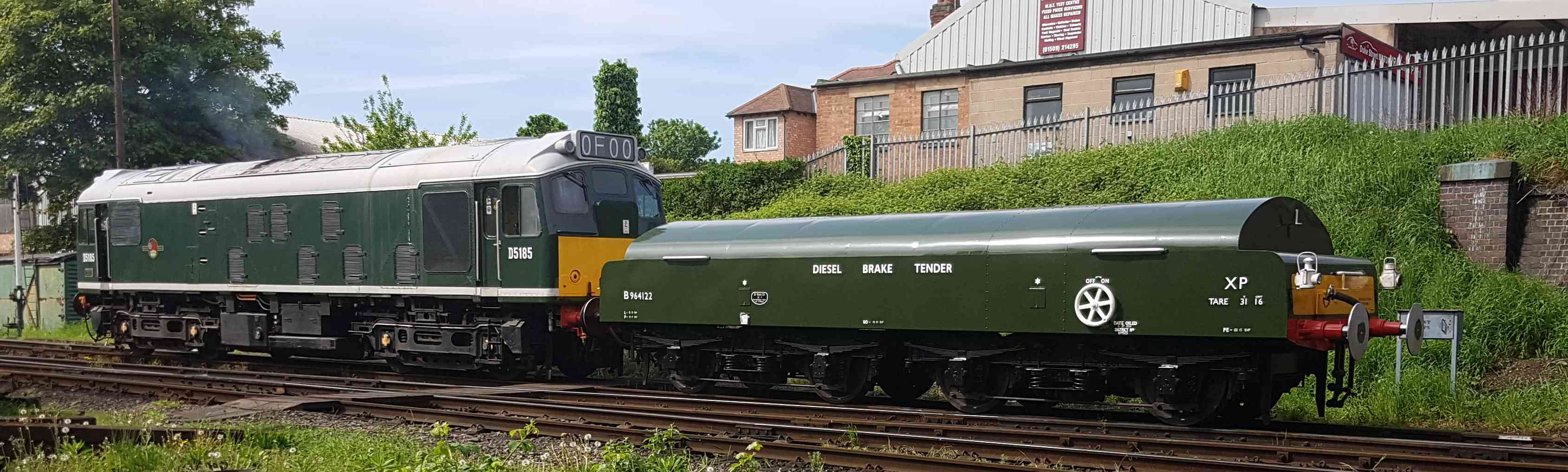
Newly built replica Brake Tender is coupled to ex-BR Class 25 diesel-electric locomotive at the Great Central Railway, Loughborough, photographed in 2018

Introduced around 1964–65, they were taken out of use in the 1980s when the practice of using unfitted trains was discontinued. None survived in preservation but an operational replica has been constructed on the Great Central Railway from the remnants of a Mk1 corridor coach and has been given the next number in the brake tender sequence; B964122.

In North America, brake tenders were often referred to as brake sleds, and were conversely primarily used around railroad yards or larger, rail-served industries. Several railroads used brake sleds in and around hump yards, including the Southern Pacific Railroad and St. Louis–San Francisco Railway. Many of these were converted from redundant steam locomotive tenders, and some from redundant locomotives - however, unlike slugs, these did not retain traction motors.

=== Powered tender ===
Certain early British steam locomotives were fitted with powered tenders. As well as holding coal and water, these had wheels powered from the locomotive to provide greater tractive effort. These were abandoned for economic reasons; railwaymen working on locomotives so equipped demanded extra pay as they were effectively running two locomotives. However, the concept was tried again on the Ravenglass and Eskdale Railway's River Mite, and the Garratt locomotive may be seen as an extension of this principle. Powered tenders were also seen on the triplex locomotives in the United States, but these experiments were not considered successful due to the varying mass of the tender. Powered tenders were used extensively on geared logging steam locomotives like the Shay, Climax, and Heisler types where the steep grades and heavy trains necessitated the extra tractive effort.

Nowadays, slugs are used with diesel-electric locomotives. The slug has traction motors that draw electricity from the locomotive's prime mover to provide extra traction.

=== German practice ===
In Germany, attention was given to ensuring that tender locomotives were capable of moderately high speeds in reverse, pushing their tenders. The numerous DRB Class 50 (2-10-0) locomotives, for example, were capable of 80 kilometres per hour (50 mph) in either direction, and were commonly used on branch lines without turning facilities.

A source of possible confusion with regards to German locomotives is that in German, Tenderlokomotive means a tank locomotive. A locomotive with a separate, hauled tender is a Schlepptenderlokomotive.

== Tender-first operations ==
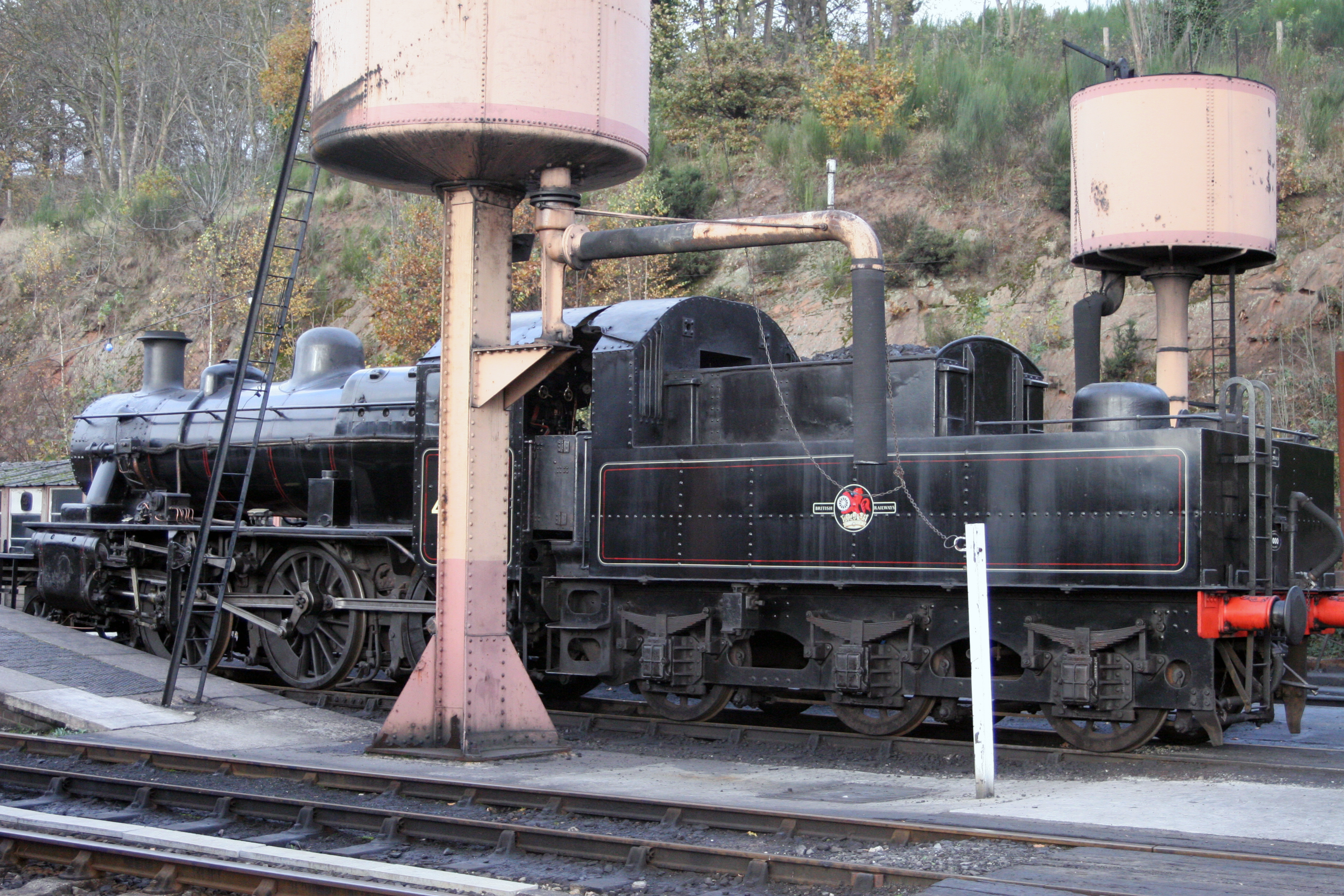
Preserved LMS Ivatt Class 2 2-6-0 no. 46443 at Bewdley on the Severn Valley Railway. The front of the tender has a half-cab for tender-first running.

In some instances, particularly on branch lines having no turnaround such as a turntable or wye at the terminus point, locomotives ran in reverse with the tender leading the train. In such instances, a headlamp (US) or headcode lamps/discs were placed on the leading end of the tender. Locomotive crews often rigged a tarpaulin (or the locomotive's storm sheet, if available) from the rear of the cab roof to the front of the tender to provide protection from the wind and to prevent coal dust being blown into the cab. Tenders designed for more frequent tender-first workings were often fitted with a fixed cab panel and windows, providing an almost fully enclosed cab.

== See also ==
- Coal bunker
