= Dixiana =

Dixiana may refer to:

- Dixiana (band), an American country music band, or their self-titled debut album
- Dixiana (film), a 1930 American film
- Dixiana, Alabama, an unincorporated community in Jefferson County, Alabama, United States
- Dixiana, South Carolina, a small rural community located southwest of Columbia, South Carolina, in Lexington County
- Dixiana Farm, historic horse breeding farm, Lexington, Kentucky.
- Dixiana (steam locomotive), a steam locomotive operated by Roaring Camp & Big Trees Narrow Gauge Railroad
