= Santa Cruz Railroad =

Former railroad in California

Overview
- Headquarters: Santa Cruz, California
- Locale: Santa Cruz County, California
- Dates of operation: 1874–1881
- Successor: Southern Pacific

Technical
- Track gauge: 3 ft (914 mm)
- Length: 21 mi (34 km)

The Santa Cruz Railroad was a narrow gauge railroad that ran 21 miles (34 kilometers) from Santa Cruz to Pajaro, California. It started operation in 1874, running from the east bank of the San Lorenzo River to Soquel, California. With completion of a bridge over the San Lorenzo, it began operation over its full length in 1876 and was sold in foreclosure in 1881.

== History ==
After Southern Pacific completed a railroad to Monterey in November 1871, with a stop at Pajaro near Watsonville, Santa Cruz County voted to subsidize construction of a railroad from Watsonville to Santa Cruz. When Southern Pacific seemed uninterested in building a standard-gauge railway, the narrow gauge Santa Cruz Railroad was built with local financing, led by Frederick A. Hihn and Claus Spreckels. The Carter Brothers firm provided engineering and contracting services, and also built a number of cars for the line. Construction began at Santa Cruz in 1873. Trestling was more extensive than had been predicted; a Howe truss bridge was built to cross Soquel Creek, and the San Lorenzo River was spanned with a truss-bridge kit manufactured by the Pacific Bridge Company. The first train from Watsonville reached Santa Cruz on May 7, 1876. Operational income was insufficient to cover unexpected expenses from a right-of-way disagreement near Watsonville and repair of storm damage in the winter of 1877–78. The Santa Cruz Railroad was unable to pay bond interest after completion of the South Pacific Coast Railroad in 1880 gave residents of Santa Cruz a shorter route to San Francisco. Operations ceased in February 1881. Through a subsidiary Pacific Improvement Company, Southern Pacific purchased the railroad in foreclosure for less than the construction cost, and converted it to standard gauge in 1883. Southern Pacific formed the subsidiary Pajaro and Santa Cruz Railroad on April 11, 1884 to operate the line until actual merger into Southern Pacific on May 14, 1888. The 3.7-mile (6.0 km) Aptos branch from Aptos to Loma Prieta was built as the Loma Prieta Railroad in 1883 and abandoned in 1928.

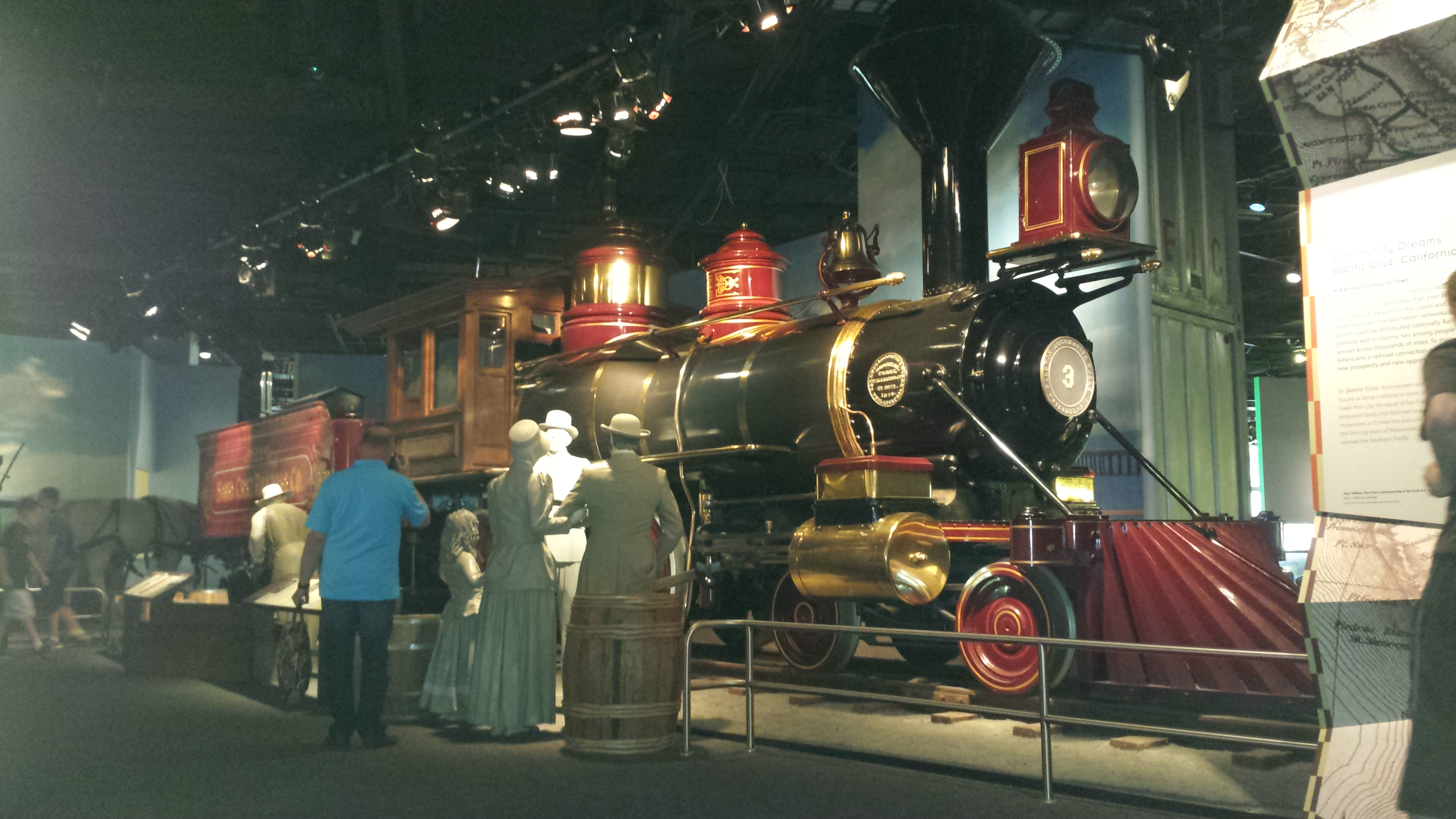
Santa Cruz Railroad #3, "Jupiter," at the National Museum of American History, Smithsonian Institution.

Santa Cruz RR engine #3, the "Jupiter," (built in about 1876) still exists. It changed hands and was heavily modified over its long service life, which extended to 1960. Various parts wore out and were replaced, such as the boiler, cab, stack, headlight and other items. O. Roy Chalk donated the engine to the Smithsonian Institution, which restored it to its original configuration.

== Locomotives ==
Number	Builder	Type	Name	Works number	Notes
#1		0-4-0	Betsey Jane		sold to a lumber company in the Santa Cruz Mountains
#3	Baldwin Locomotive Works	4-4-0	Jupiter	3972	sold to Guatemala in 1885; preserved at National Museum of American History
#4	Baldwin Locomotive Works	4-4-0	Pacific aka Neptune	3774	

== See also ==
- Roaring Camp & Big Trees Narrow Gauge Railroad
- Santa Cruz, Big Trees and Pacific Railway
