= Lompico, California =

Lompico
- census-designated place
- Position in California.
- Coordinates: 37°06′53″N 122°03′10″W
- Country: United States
- State: California
- County: Santa Cruz

Area
  - Total: 3.378 sq mi (8.750 km^{2})
  - Land: 3.378 sq mi (8.750 km^{2})
  - Water: 0 sq mi (0 km^{2}) 0%
- Elevation: 968 ft (295 m)

Population (2020)
  - Total: 1,154
  - Density: 341.6/sq mi (131.9/km^{2})
- Time zone: UTC-8 (Pacific (PST))
  - Summer (DST): UTC-7 (PDT)
- ZIP Code: 95018
- Area code: 831
- GNIS feature ID: 2583060

Lompico (from Loma and Pico, Spanish for "Hill" and "Peak") is a census-designated place (CDP) in Santa Cruz County, California, United States. Lompico sits at an elevation of 968 feet (295 m). Lompico shares the 95018 ZIP code with Felton. Lompico was founded in 1927. It is in area code 831. The 2020 United States census reported Lompico's population was 1,154.

== Geography ==
Lompico is proximate to Scotts Valley, Ben Lomond and Felton at latitude 37.106 and longitude -122.053.

According to the United States Census Bureau, the CDP covers an area of 3.4 square miles (8.7 km^{2}), all land.

=== Climate ===
This region experiences warm (but not hot) and dry summers, with no average monthly temperatures above 71.6 °F. According to the Köppen Climate Classification system, Lompico has a warm-summer Mediterranean climate, abbreviated "Csb" on climate maps.

== Demographics ==
Historical population
Census	Pop.	Note	%±
2010	1,137		—
2020	1,154		1.5%
U.S. Decennial Census; 1860–1870 1880-1890; 1900 1910 1920; 1930 1940 1950; 1960 1970 1980; 1990 2000 2010; 2020

Lompico first appeared as a census-designated place in the 2010 United States census.

=== Racial and ethnic composition ===
Live Oak CDP, California – Racial and ethnic composition Note: the US Census treats Hispanic/Latino as an ethnic category. This table excludes Latinos from the racial categories and assigns them to a separate category. Hispanics/Latinos may be of any race.
Race / Ethnicity (NH = Non-Hispanic)	Pop 2010	Pop 2020	% 2010	% 2020
White alone (NH)	942	919	82.85%	79.64%
Black or African American alone (NH)	6	5	0.53%	0.43%
Native American or Alaska Native alone (NH)	9	3	0.79%	0.26%
Asian alone (NH)	20	17	1.76%	1.47%
Native Hawaiian or Pacific Islander alone (NH)	4	3	0.35%	0.26%
Other race alone (NH)	2	13	0.18%	1.13%
Mixed race or Multiracial (NH)	39	66	3.43%	5.72%
Hispanic or Latino (any race)	115	128	10.11%	11.09%
Total	1,137	1,154	100.00%	100.00%

=== 2020 census ===
As of the 2020 census, Lompico had a population of 1,154. The population density was 341.6 inhabitants per square mile (131.9/km^{2}). 54.8% of residents lived in urban areas, while 45.2% lived in rural areas.

The whole population lived in households. There were 496 households, out of which 90 (18.1%) had children under the age of 18 living in them, 225 (45.4%) were married-couple households, 42 (8.5%) were cohabiting couple households, 74 (14.9%) had a female householder with no partner present, and 155 (31.3%) had a male householder with no partner present. 158 households (31.9%) were one person, and 74 (14.9%) were one person aged 65 or older. The average household size was 2.33. There were 271 families (54.6% of all households).

The age distribution was 163 people (14.1%) under the age of 18, 86 people (7.5%) aged 18 to 24, 329 people (28.5%) aged 25 to 44, 366 people (31.7%) aged 45 to 64, and 210 people (18.2%) who were 65 years of age or older. The median age was 44.9 years. For every 100 females, there were 96.9 males, and for every 100 females age 18 and over, there were 95.8 males.

There were 537 housing units at an average density of 159.0 units per square mile (61.4 units/km^{2}), of which 496 (92.4%) were occupied. Of these, 385 (77.6%) were owner-occupied, and 111 (22.4%) were occupied by renters. The vacancy rate was 7.6%; the homeowner vacancy rate was 1.3%; and the rental vacancy rate was 2.6%.

== Notable residents ==
- Jerry Garcia's family had a country house in Lompico, which he visited while he was young. He lost his middle finger due to a wood-chopping accident there.
- Janis Joplin often jammed with her band "Big Brother and the Holding Company" in Lompico.
