= Dixiana (steam locomotive) =

Preserved steam locomotive

Roaring Camp & Big Trees Narrow Gauge Railroad #1 (Dixiana)
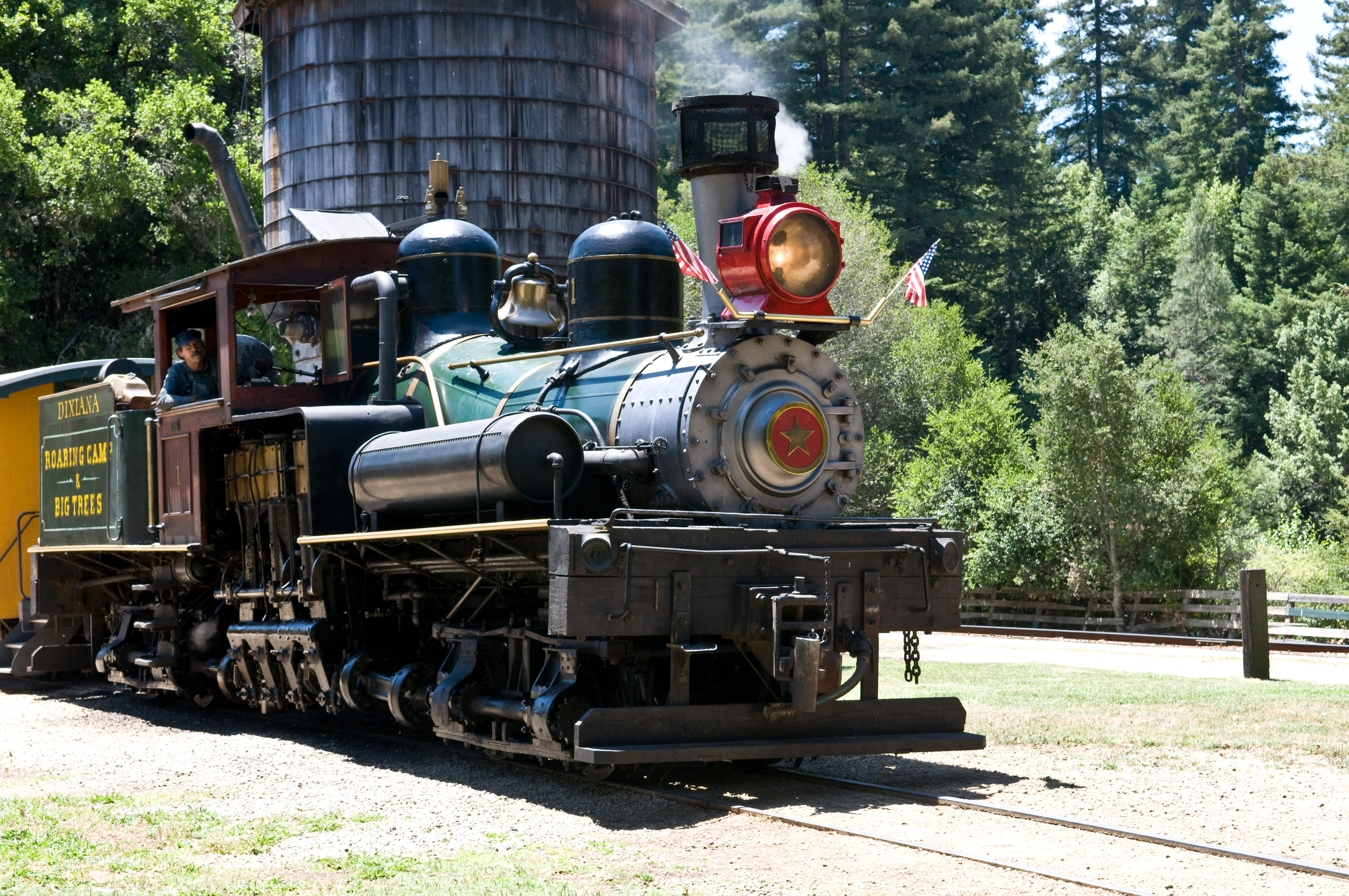
- RC&BTNGRR #1 in Felton, California, in 2008
Type and origin
- Power type: Steam
- Builder: Lima Locomotive Works
- Serial number: 2593
- Build date: October 12, 1912
Specifications
- Configuration
  - Whyte: 2-truck Shay
  - AAR: B-B
- Gauge: 4 ft 8 1/2 in (1,435 mm) as built, 3 ft (914 mm)
- Trucks: Two
- Wheel diameter: 29 in (0.737 m)
- Total weight: 42 tons
- Fuel type: New: Coal; Now: Oil
- Water cap.: 1560 gal
- Cylinders: Three, outside, vertical
- Valve gear: Stephenson
- Valve type: Side valve
- Loco brake: Steam
- Train brakes: Steam
- Couplers: Knuckle
Performance figures
- Tractive effort: 17,330 lbf (77.09 kN)
Career
- Operators: Alaculsy Lumber Company (1912–1917); Tennga Lumber Company (1917–1919); Southern Iron & Equipment Company (March 1919–August 1919); W.M. Ritter Lumber Company (August 1919–1938); Coal Processing Corporation (1938–1958); Roaring Camp & Big Trees Narrow Gauge Railroad (1958–present)
- Numbers: ALCO 3; TLCO 3; SI&E 1466; W.MRLCO 3; CPC 3; CPC 2593; RCBG 1
- Retired: 1950s
- Restored: April 6, 1963
- Current owner: Roaring Camp & Big Trees Narrow Gauge Railroad
- Disposition: Operational

Roaring Camp & Big Trees Narrow Gauge Railroad No.1, also known as "Dixiana", is a Class B Shay steam locomotive built in 1912 by the Lima Locomotive Works of Lima, Ohio. It was built for the W.M Ritter Lumber Company. The locomotive was retired in the mid-1950s and was purchased by F. Norman Clark for use on his Roaring Camp & Big Trees Narrow Gauge Railroad, where it still operates.

== History ==
=== Industrial service ===
Dixiana was built on October 12, 1912, at the Lima Locomotive Works of Lima, Ohio for the Alaculsy Lumber Company of Conasauga, Tennessee; it was their second locomotive to carry number 3. It hauled lumber trains in the mountains of Southeastern Tennessee and Northern Georgia. In 1917, No. 3 was transferred to the Tennga Lumber Company, the successor to Alaculsy, retaining its number. In March 1919, it was sold to the Southern Iron & Equipment Company, and became their No. 1466. It hauled metal at their Atlanta, Georgia plant. In August of that year, it was sold to the W. M. Ritter Lumber Company in Proctor, North Carolina, and converted to from standard gauge to 3 ft (914 mm) gauge. It returned to its previous number, becoming their second No. 3. The locomotive later moved to W.M. Ritter's McClure, Virginia operation. In 1938, the locomotive was sold to Coal Processing Corporation and carried both the No. 3 and later No. 2593 in Dixiana, Virginia.

By the mid-1950s, the locomotive was retired from service and left in Dixiana.

=== Roaring Camp Railroad ===
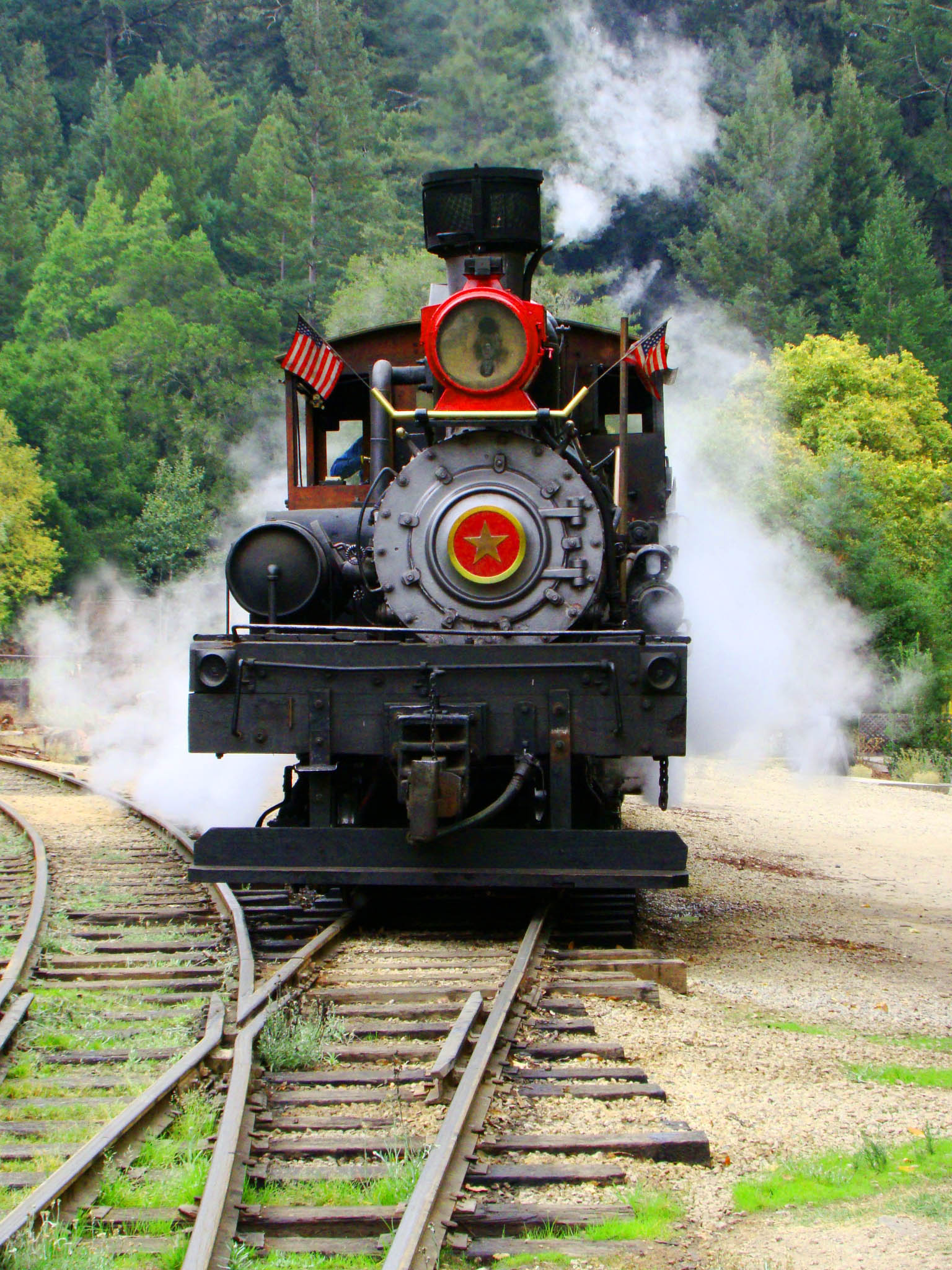
Dixiana at Sawmill Siding collecting its cars in 2008

F. Norman Clark purchased Dixiana in 1958 for the Roaring Camp & Big Trees Narrow Gauge Railroad which he was setting up in Felton, California. In 1962, with help from the Southern Railway, the locomotive was shipped to New Orleans, where the SP took over and shipped it on to Los Angeles on the Sunset Limited Route. From there it was taken to Watsonville Junction and transferred over the Santa Cruz Branch to Felton. It arrived on October 12, 1962, fifty years to the day after it was built.

Dixiana was restored to operation and converted to burn bunker oil instead of coal to prevent trackside fires. It was named "Dixiana" after its last industrial home. A new H. Belfield & Co. 3-chime whistle was installed during the restoration.

The restoration was completed on April 6, 1963, when Dixiana pulled its first passenger train at Roaring Camp.

Dixiana lacked a builder's plate until a replica was fitted in 2020.

== See also ==
- Southern Pacific Transportation Company
- Santa Cruz, Big Trees and Pacific Railway
