= Santa Cruz Railroad 3 =

Preserved narrow gauge American 4-4-0 locomotive

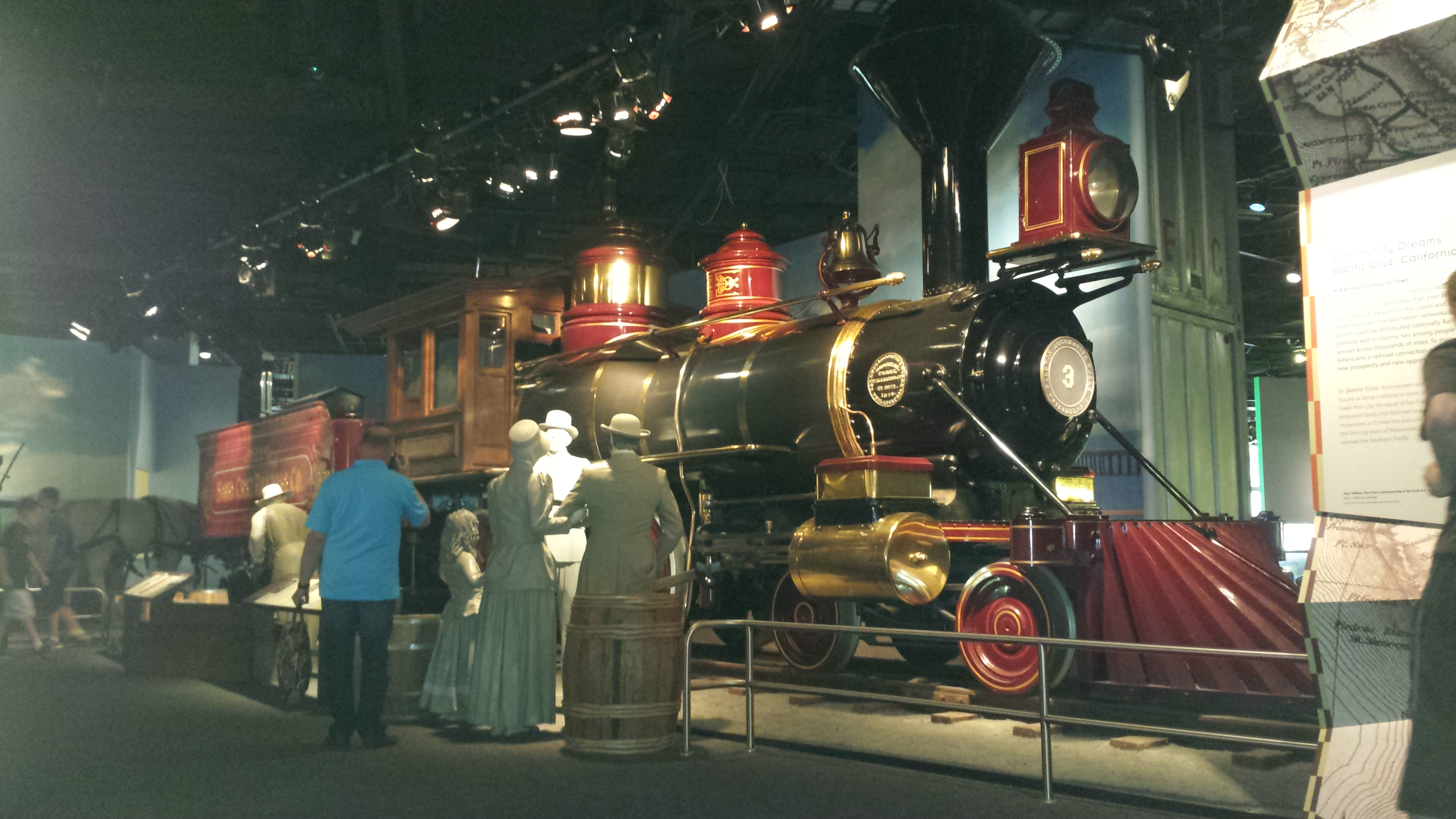
- The Jupiter on display in the National Museum of American History.
Type and origin
- Power type: Steam
- Builder: Baldwin Locomotive Works
- Serial number: 3972
- Model: 8/18 C
- Build date: 1875
Specifications
- Configuration
  - Whyte: 4-4-0
  - UIC: 2′B n
- Gauge: 3 ft (914 mm)
- Driver dia.: 42 in (1,067 mm)
- Loco weight: 22 short tons (20.0 t)
- Fuel type: Oil
- Boiler pressure: 140 psi (0.97 MPa)
- Cylinders: Two, outside
- Cylinder size: 12 in × 16 in (300 mm × 410 mm)
Performance figures
- Tractive effort: 5,595 lbf (24.89 kN)
Career
- Operators: Santa Cruz Railroad, Guatemala Central Railway, Guatemala Railway, International Railways of Central America
- Numbers: SCR 3 GRwy 61; IRCA 84
- Official name: Jupiter
- Retired: 1883 (1st retirement); 1960 (2nd retirement)
- Restored: 1904 (1st restoration); 1976 (cosmetically)
- Current owner: Smithsonian Institution
- Disposition: On static display

The Santa Cruz Railroad 3 is a 4-4-0 "Eight-Wheeler" narrow gauge type steam locomotive in Washington D.C. It is one of three preserved Baldwin Class 8/18 C 4-4-0 locomotives in the United States, the other two being the North Pacific Coast Railroad No. 12, the "Sonoma" displayed at the California State Railroad Museum, and the Eureka and Palisade Railroad No. 4, "Eureka" which is privately owned, the latter of which being the only operable example. It was common practice for American railroads of the 19th century to name their engines after Jupiter, "King of Gods", and other mythological figures to attract attention, thus the engine should not be confused with the engine of Golden Spike fame.

== History ==
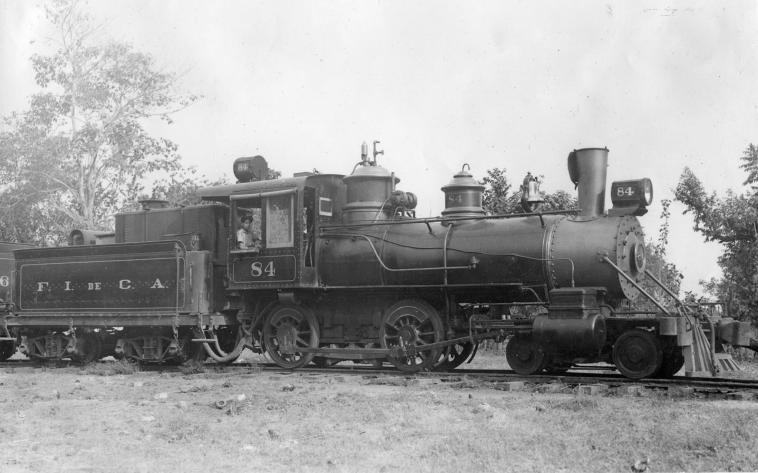
Santa Cruz Railroad No. 3, "Jupiter," when it was in service in Guatemala, near the end of its service life, in the 20th century. By this time, it received a straight stack, electric headlight, a steel cab, and had been converted to burn oil.

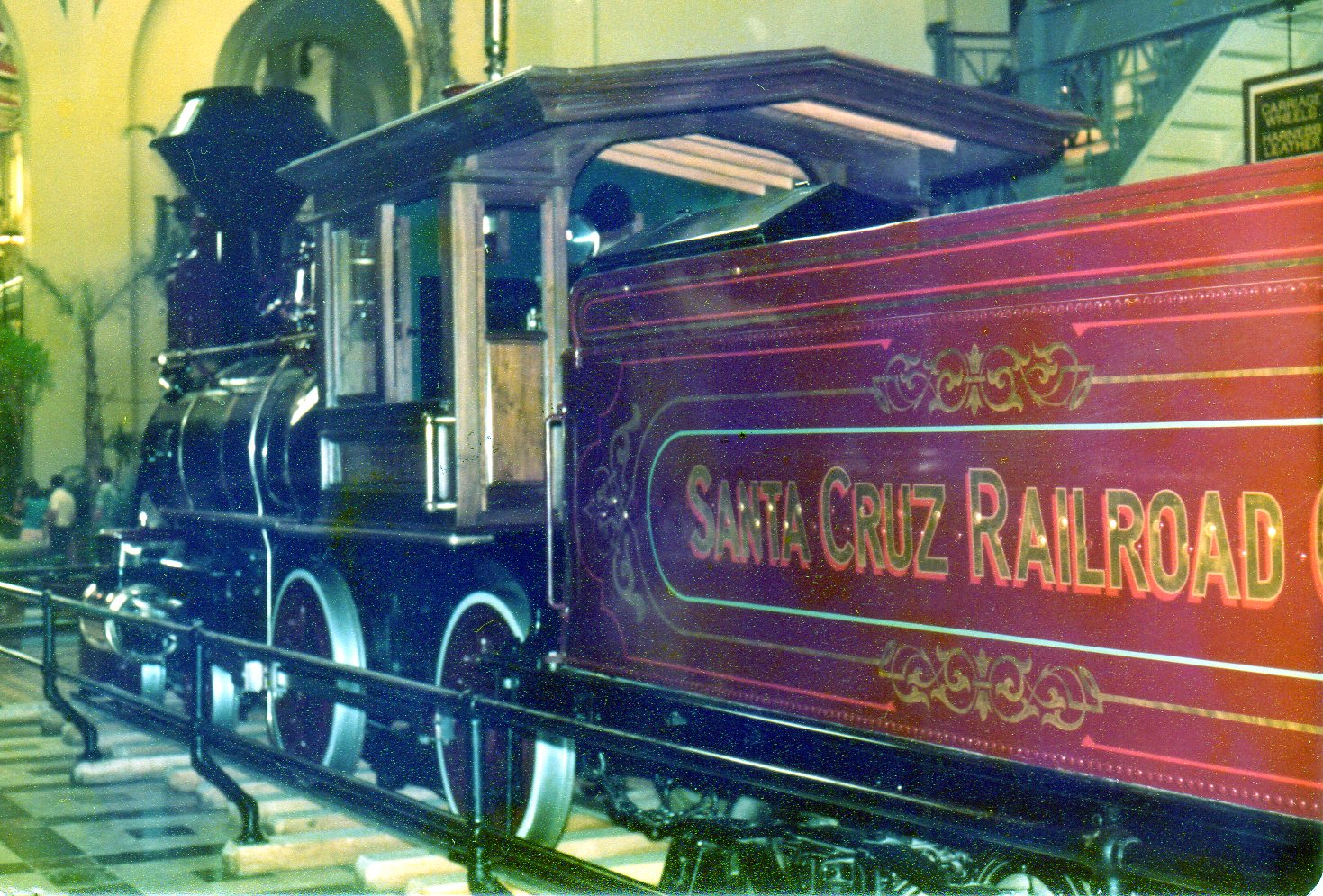
The restored engine, inside the Smithsonian's Arts and Industries Building, where it had been on display from 1976 until 1999.

The locomotive was built in 1876 for the Santa Cruz Railroad, which was built to transport passengers and goods from the town of Santa Cruz, California, to connect with the Southern Pacific Railroad in Watsonville. The engine served on this railroad until 1883, when the railroad was bought by the Southern Pacific and converted to Standard gauge. As converting the engines to the wider gauge would be costly and uneconomical, the railroad elected to sell off the inherited engines and use its own Standard gauge engines instead. As such, the Jupiter was sold to the Guatemala Central Railway, who dropped the engine's name but retained its number. In 1904, the Jersey City, New Jersey–based United Fruit Company consolidated the Guatemala Central, the Guatemala Northern, Guatemala Western, and Ocos Railways into the Guatemala Railway, who renumbered the engine as no. 61. In 1912, the Guatemala Railway and the Salvador Central Railway were consolidated into the International Railways of Central America. The engine was renumbered 84 by the IRCA in 1928, and continued to transport fruit as well a small number of passengers along one of the railroad's branchlines in the northwestern part of the country until 1960.

In the 1960s, United Fruit was purchased by New York entrepreneur and DC Transit operator O. Roy Chalk. For reasons unknown, Chalk selected the former Jupiter locomotive for display as part of a children's park he was developing in Washington D.C., and the engine was shipped to that city to be displayed. In D.C., the engine drew the attention of Smithsonian Institution curator John H. White, Jr., who had taken particular notice of the engine's year built. White convinced Chalk to donate the engine to the Smithsonian as part of their upcoming Bicentennial Exhibition of 1976. The engine was cosmetically restored to its as-delivered appearance, and placed on display in the Smithsonian's Arts and Industries Building in 1976 for the exhibit, which was a recreation of the displays of the Centennial Exposition of 1876. The engine was displayed in this building until 1999, when it was relocated to the Smithsonian's National Museum of American History on the opposite side of the National Mall, initially placed beside Southern Railway engine 1401. The engine was relocated again in 2004 (though it remained within the museum building) when the exhibits were reconfigured into the America on the Move exhibition, which features the engine displayed as part of a diorama recreating its arrival in Santa Cruz in 1876.
