= Santa Cruz, Big Trees and Pacific Railway =

Railroad

- Santa Cruz, Big Trees and Pacific Railway #2600
- Locale: Santa Cruz County, California, USA

Commercial operations
- Built by: Santa Cruz and Felton Railroad
- Original gauge: 3 ft (914 mm) converted to 4 ft 8 1/2 in (1,435 mm)

Preserved operations
- Reporting mark: SCBG
- Preserved gauge: 4 ft 8 1/2 in (1,435 mm)

Commercial history
- Closed: 1981

Preservation history
- 1985: Started
- Headquarters: Felton

Website
- roaringcamp.com/beachtrain.html

The Santa Cruz, Big Trees and Pacific Railway (reporting mark SCBG) is operated as a seasonal tourist attraction in Northern California, also referred to as the "Beach Train". Its partner line, the Roaring Camp & Big Trees Narrow Gauge Railroad, is a heritage railroad.

The Beach Train uses diesel locomotives to haul vintage passenger cars over an 8-mile (13-kilometer) route between Felton, California, and Santa Cruz, California. The SCBT&P is one of very few railroads in North America with extensive street running rails, with trackage in Santa Cruz.

== History ==
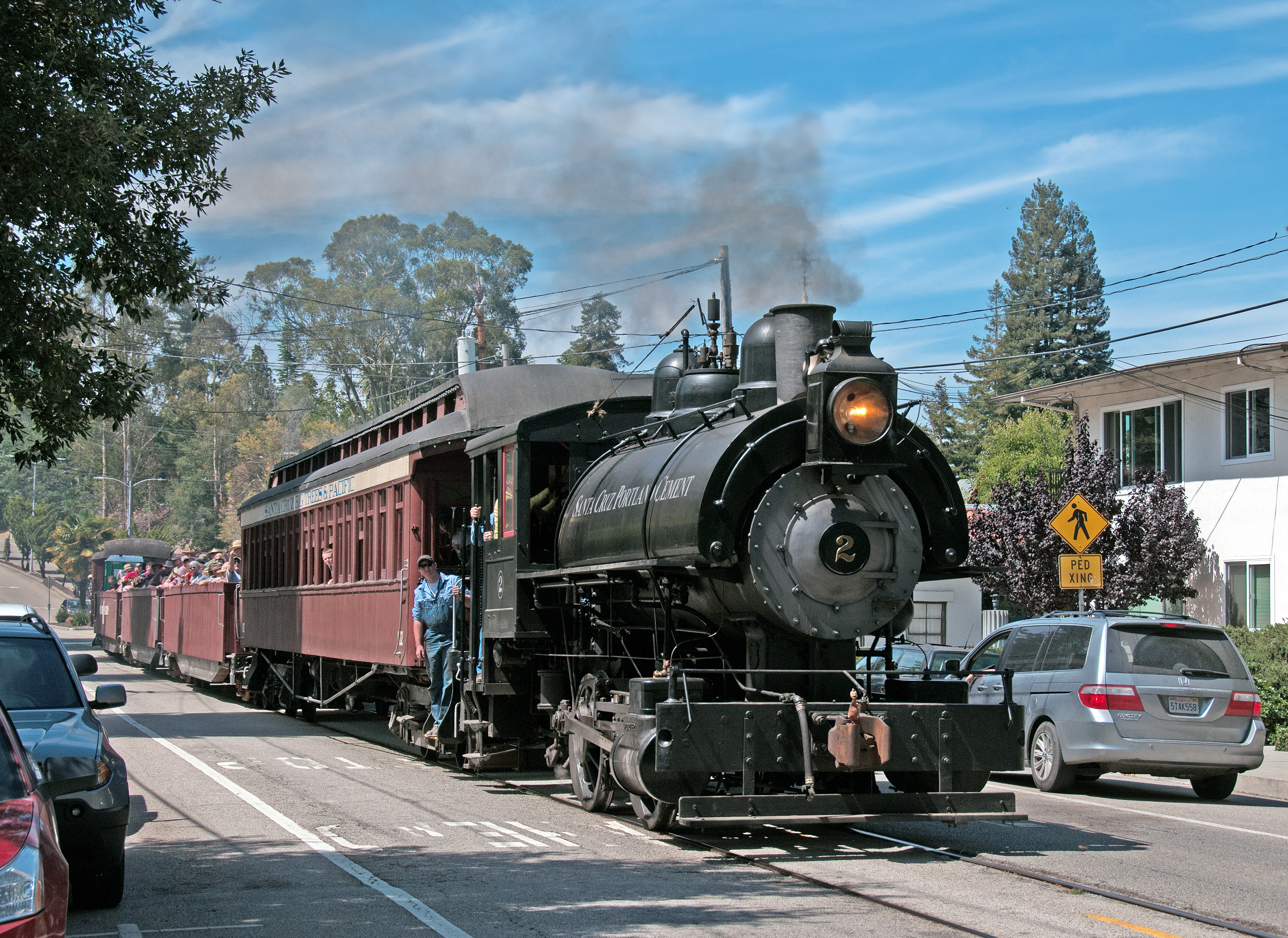
Santa Cruz Portland Cement 0-4-0 #2 steam engine (no longer used by 2022) rolling into Santa Cruz, California, on former SP trackage on Chestnut Street

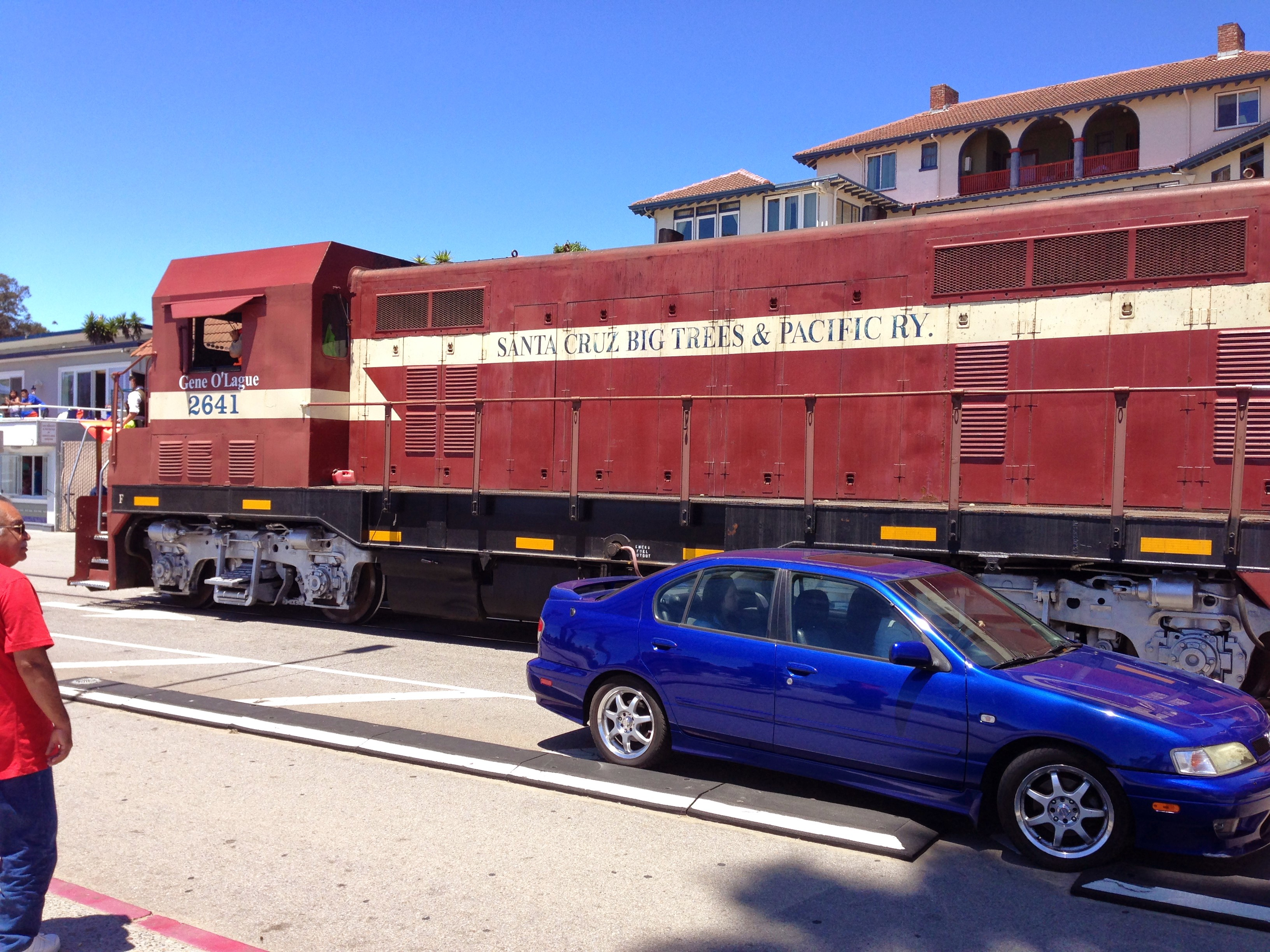
Side view of CF7 2641

The railway began life as the 3 ft (914 mm) narrow gauge Santa Cruz & Felton Railroad, built between its namesake cities of Santa Cruz and Felton in 1875 to send logs and lumber down from the Santa Cruz Mountains to mills and wharves on Monterey Bay. In 1880, the South Pacific Coast Railroad narrow gauge network completed its line from Alameda to Los Gatos, then over the mountains to Felton, absorbing the Santa Cruz & Felton to complete the line to Santa Cruz.

In 1887, the Southern Pacific purchased the South Pacific Coast and converted it to standard gauge over the course of more than a decade. Washouts closed the majority of the line in 1940, and the Santa Cruz-Olympia section remained in operation to serve the timber and sand industries. In 1981, further washouts brought closure of the line from Eblis to Olympia, until the line was purchased by Norman Clark, operator of the narrow gauge Roaring Camp & Big Trees Narrow Gauge Railroad and adjacent 1880s-themed park in Felton. Local legend has it that the name "Roaring Camp" is historical too, coming from the moniker that Mexican authorities gave to what was then, in the 1840s, the wild settlement of Zayante, founded by mountain man Isaac Graham. The first train from Felton to Rincon ran in 1985 (the year after Clark's death from pneumonia that he acquired in his work to reopen this line) and the entire line to Santa Cruz was once again reopened to traffic some time later. Clark's daughter Melani Jolley-Clark manages the company now.

Trains originate at the Roaring Camp depot in Felton, but the original Southern Pacific Coast depot at New Felton (built in 1880) still stands and serves as administrative offices for the company. The freight shed, constructed from boards salvaged from the Boulder Creek to Felton log flume, is still used by the SCBT&P as a workshop. The original Santa Cruz & Felton never crossed the San Lorenzo River and continued through the middle of the town of Felton.

In August 1990 the railroad re-started limited freight service, moving lumber from Santa Cruz to Felton about twice a month. On April 30, 2021, the railroad took over freight operations on a short section of the Santa Cruz Branch from Watsonville to Pajaro. The railroad uses a pair of CF7s acquired in June 2018 to connect customers in Watsonville to the main rail line at Pajaro.

In January 2022, the railroad was threatened with adverse abandonment following a closed-door meeting of the Santa Cruz County Regional Transportation Commission, alleged to be part of a larger effort to replace the Santa Cruz Branch with a rail trail by two local special interest groups known as Trail Now and Santa Cruz Greenway. During the June primary of the 2022 California elections, a ballot measure, Measure D, was put on the ballot to authorize the railbanking of the Santa Cruz Branch for an "interim trail"; it failed after an overwhelming "no" vote.

== Locomotives ==
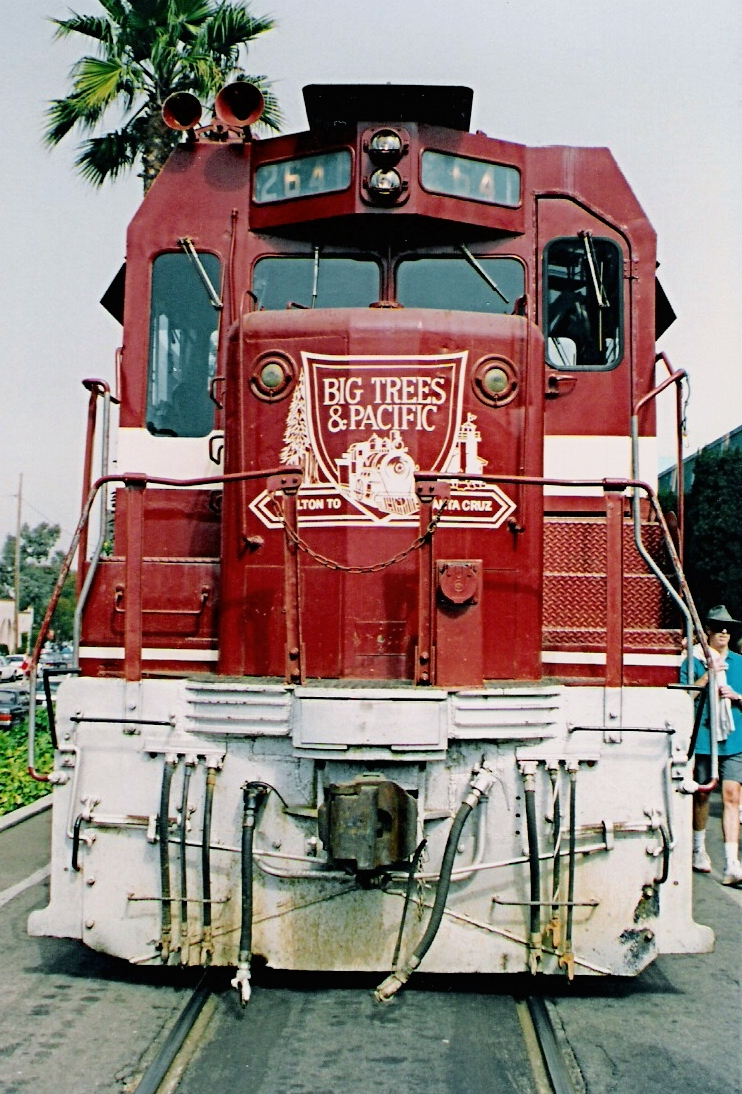
Locomotive 2641 stops at the Santa Cruz Beach Boardwalk in the summer of 1993.

The SCBT&P utilizes two former Atchison, Topeka and Santa Fe CF7 locomotives as its current motive power. These former EMD F7 units were rebuilt by the Santa Fe at their Cleburne, Texas shops to their current, more practical arrangement following the end of passenger service. Both still carry their original ATSF road numbers, #2600 and #2641. In 2013, Locomotive 2641 was named in tribute to Gene O'Lague, a longtime Southern Pacific engineer who was one of the original employees of Roaring Camp. A third locomotive, a Whitcomb 45-ton diesel switcher numbered 20, was retired in 1996 and stored; as of August 2022, the locomotive is being restored to operation for work train service. Santa Cruz Portland Cement #2, an 0-4-0ST steam locomotive built by H.K. Porter in 1906, has visited the railroad in the past.

In July 2018, two additional CF7 locomotives (#2467 and #2524) were acquired from the Texas Rock Crusher Railroad.

== See also ==
- List of heritage railroads in the United States
- Roaring Camp and Big Trees Narrow-Gauge Railroad
- Santa Cruz Railroad
- Ocean Shore Railroad
