= Roaring Camp & Big Trees Narrow Gauge Railroad =

Tourist railroad in California

Coordinates: 37.0407°N 122.0624°W

Roaring Camp Railroads

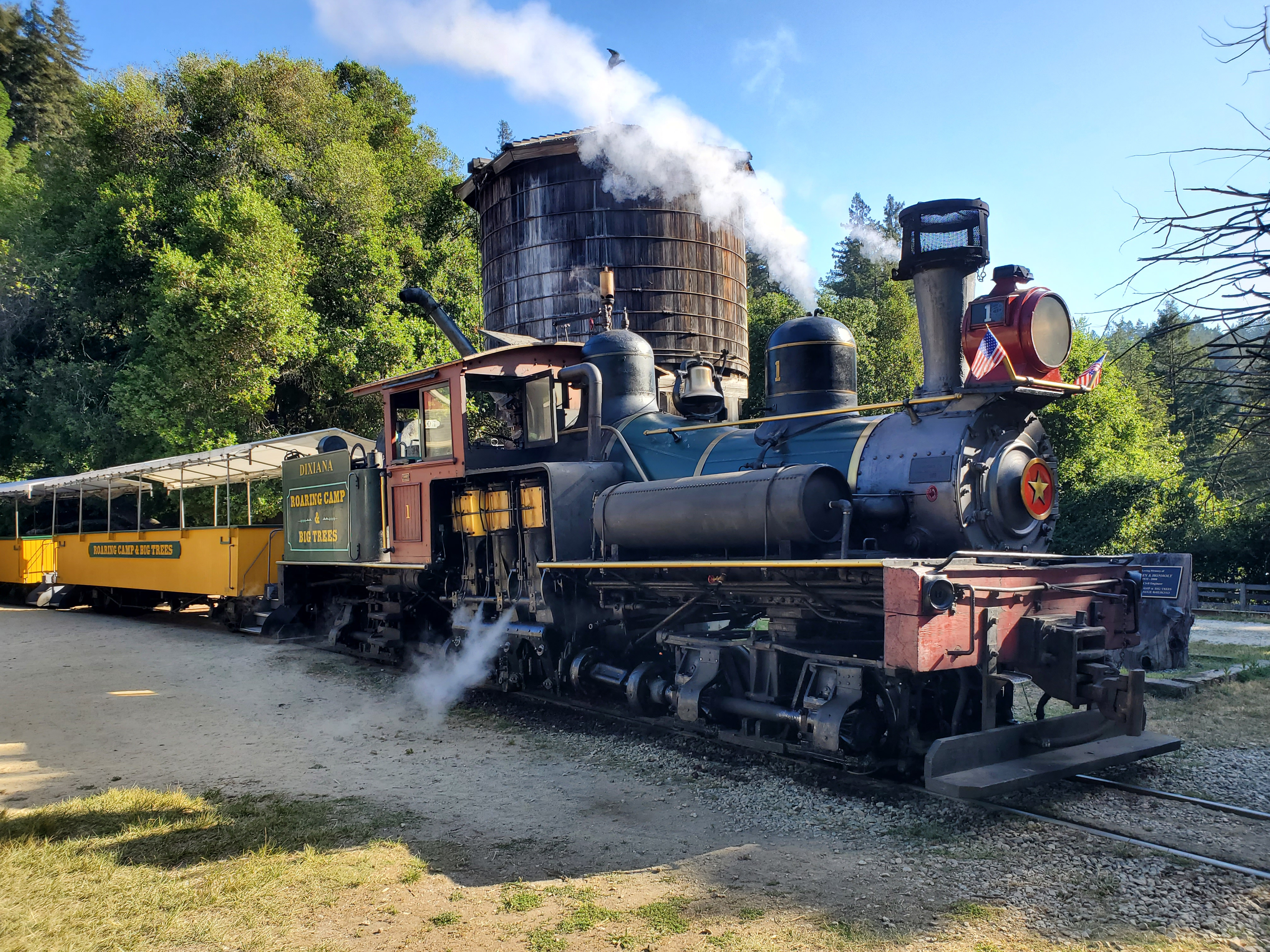
- The Dixiana at Roaring Camp in 2023

Overview
- Headquarters: Felton, California
- Reporting mark: RCBT
- Locale: Santa Cruz County, California, US
- Dates of operation: 1963–present

Technical
- Track gauge: 3 ft (914 mm)

The Roaring Camp & Big Trees Narrow Gauge Railroad is a 3 ft (914 mm) narrow-gauge tourist railroad in Santa Cruz County, California that starts from the Roaring Camp depot in Felton and runs up steep grades through redwood forests to the top of nearby Bear Mountain, a distance of 3.25 miles (5.23 kilometers).

The railroad runs most trains using steam locomotives, several dating from the 1890s. They are some of the oldest narrow-gauge steam locomotives still providing regular passenger service in the United States. (Knott's Berry Farm operates two narrow-gauge engines built in 1881, and the Cumbres & Toltec Scenic Railroad runs one built in 1883.)

The American Society of Mechanical Engineers designated three of the railroad's locomotives as Historic Mechanical Engineering Landmark #134 in 1988.

== History ==
The Big Trees Ranch was bought in 1867 by San Francisco businessman Joseph Warren Welch to preserve the giant redwood trees from logging. It was the first property in the state acquired specifically for that purpose. In 1930, the Welch family sold part of the property to Santa Cruz County, which eventually became part of Henry Cowell Redwoods State Park.

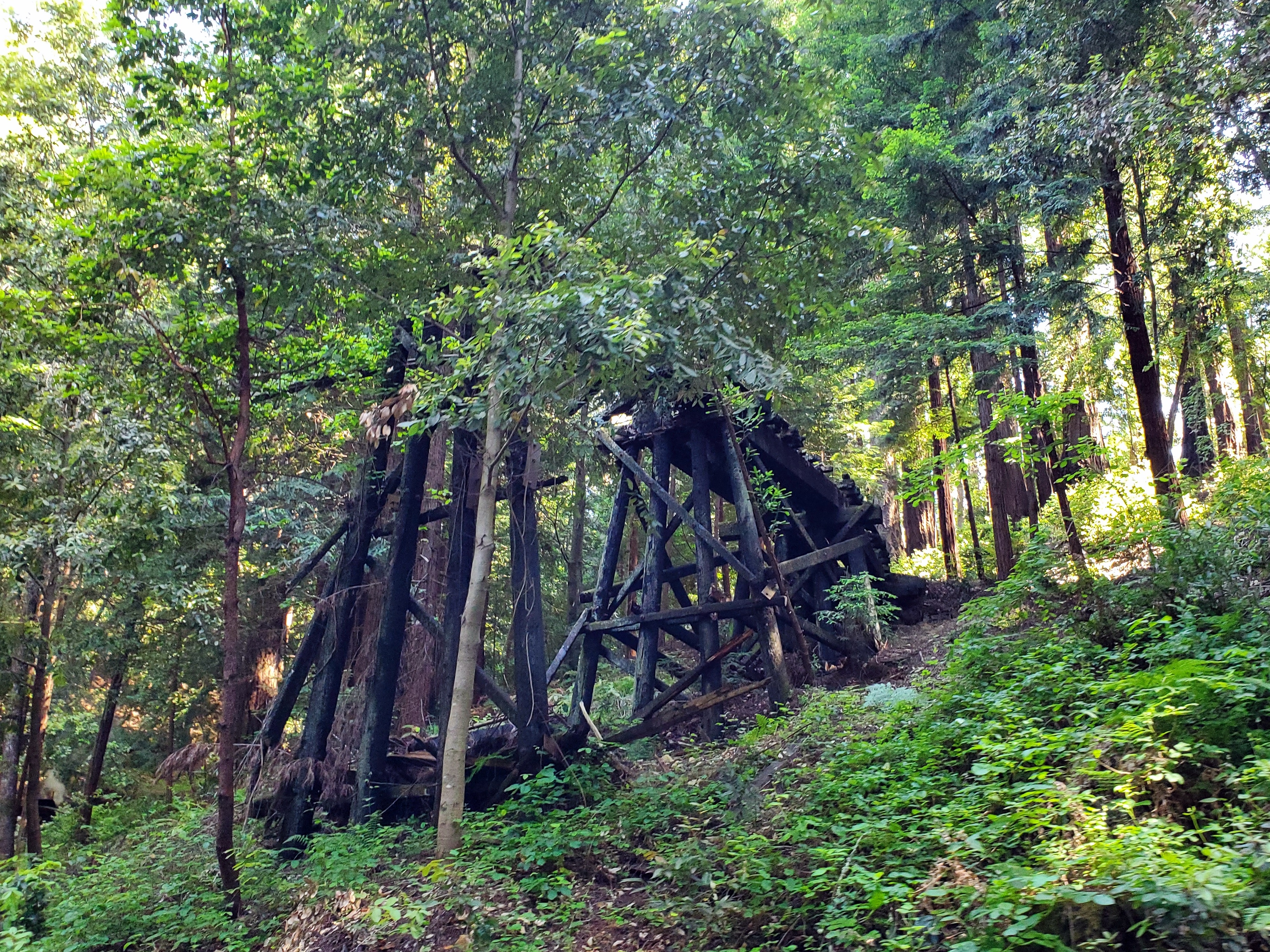
The fire-damaged trestle seen in 2023

Roaring Camp Railroads operations began in 1963 under the guidance of F. Norman Clark (1935–1985), who was the founder and owner. His purpose was to keep a family tradition of constructing railroads and to "bring the romance and color of steam railroading back to America". In 1958, Clark found the engine Dixiana abandoned near a coal mine in the Appalachian Mountains; he described it as looking like a " rusty pile of junk". Dixiana was reconditioned and began service in 1963 on rails that had been shipped around Cape Horn in 1881. The railway route was laid out so that as few trees as possible would have to be cut on the 170 acres (69 ha) Clark acquired with a 99-year lease of the larger Big Trees Ranch.

Originally, two large trestles formed a "corkscrew" loop at Spring Canyon, but these were destroyed by a 1976 fire (alleged to have been arson), the smoke from which could be seen from San Francisco. Within six months, a switchback was constructed to bypass the severed loop and the line was returned to service. The switchback has an estimated 10.5% grade. The length of the tail tracks in the switchback restricts the trains that may be operated to six cars or fewer; longer trains require a diesel switcher to run at the rear and bring the excess cars up and down the switchback separately.

Clark's wife, Georgiana, Vice President of Operations assumed the ownership and management responsibilities following his death on December 2, 1985. In 2003, the first "Day Out with Thomas" special event was held. The event was the single largest in the 40-year history of Roaring Camp, with an estimated 25,000 participants over a three-day period. On December 28, 2015, a train collided with a stop block on part of the switchback, injuring six people. The cause was a combination of driver error and a mechanical issue with the locomotive's throttle valve.

== Locomotives ==
The railroad owns several locomotives in various states of repair. Regular service is typically handled by the railroad's two Shay locomotives, with occasional appearances by the Heisler. 0-4-2ST "Kahuku," the oldest locomotive on the roster, is used in shuttle service on special occasions, as it is not capable of hauling trains up the mountain due to its small size.

Number	Name	Image	Builder	Type	Works number	Built	Acquired	Notes
#1	Dixiana		Lima Locomotive Works	Class B 42-2 Shay	#2593	1912	October 1962	Ex-Coal Processing Corp. #3 at Dixiana, Virginia. Operable and in regular service.
#2	Tuolumne		Heisler Locomotive Works	2-truck Heisler	#1041	1899	1963	ex-West Side Lumber Company #3. Operable Restored 2001 and 2010.
#3	Kahuku		Baldwin Locomotive Works	0-4-2ST	#10756	1890	1966	ex-Kahuku Plantation #1 "Keana." Operable, and used on special occasions.
#4	Waipahu		Baldwin Locomotive Works	0-6-2ST	15321	1897	1977	Sold to Western Village theme park, Nikkō, Japan, in 1988. Ex-Oahu Sugar #1.
#5	Bloomsburg		Climax Locomotive Works	Class B Climax	#1692	1928	1975	Ex-Elk River Coal & Lumber Company #3. Acquired from Carroll Park & Western Railroad, Bloomsburg, Pennsylvania. Inoperable, rebuild planned as funds & shop space allow. As of 2017, the locomotive's engine set can turn over on steam.
#6	Daisy		Lima Locomotive Works	Class B 32-2 Shay	#2519	1912	1988	ex-W.M. Ritter Lumber Company #7. Last operated and retired at Daisy, Kentucky. Inoperable.
#7	Sonora		Lima Locomotive Works	Class C 60-3 Shay	#2465	1911	1986	ex-West Side Lumber Company #7 Undergoing testing as of November 2026. Restored 2007–2009 and 2018-present.
#14	Rosa		Lima Locomotive Works	Class C 60-3 Shay	#2835	1916	2026	ex-West Side Lumber Company and Georgetown Loop #14. Previously displayed at the Colorado Railroad Museum. Inoperable, planned use at Roaring Camp TBD.
#40			Plymouth Locomotive Works	14-ton Diesel (model DDT)				ex-Kaiser Steel, Fontana, California Operable
#50			Davenport Locomotive Works	Diesel	#			ex-D&RGW #50 Operable sold, now at Colorado Railroad Museum, Golden, Colorado
#50 (2nd)			General Electric	25-ton Diesel Electric	#15816			ex-Bethlehem Steel #14, Los Angeles, California Operable, sold to Kauai Plantation Railway, Kauai, Hawaii (2010)
#60			General Electric	56-ton Diesel Electric	#33250			ex-Bethlehem Steel #12, Los Angeles, California Inoperable sold to Georgetown Loop Railroad, Georgetown, Colorado (2010)
#?? (30?)			Whitcomb Locomotive Works					ex-Kauai Plantation Railway #10, Kauai, HI Obtained 2010, sold March 2013 to Redwood Gulch Shortline
#10			Milwaukee Locomotive Manufacturing Company	Motorcar (formerly "Critter")				ex-West Side Lumber Company. Operable

=== Historic mechanical engineering landmark ===
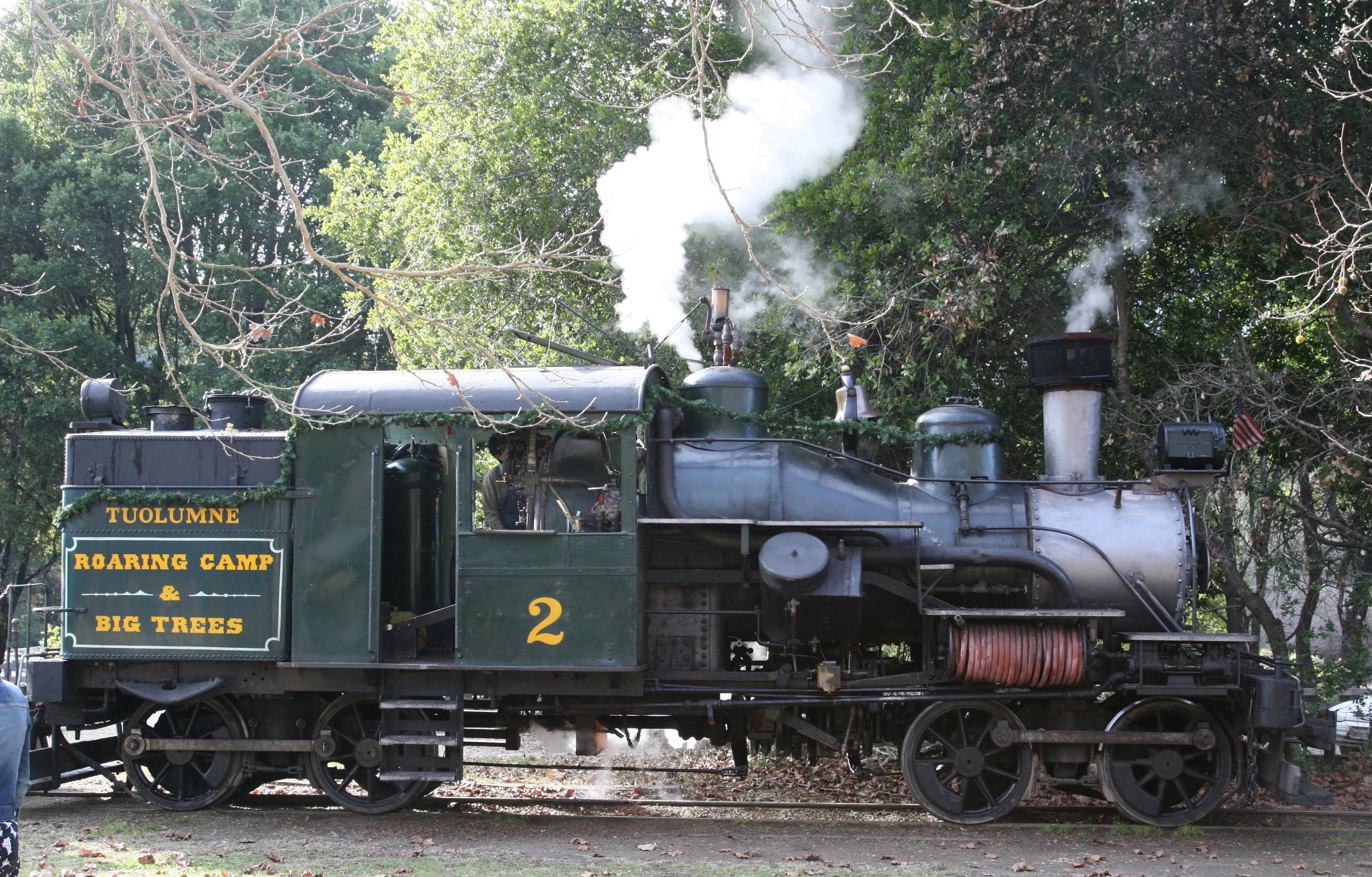
Locomotive #2 in 2008

The American Society of Mechanical Engineers collectively designated Roaring Camp's Shay, Climax and Heisler engines National Mechanical Engineering Historical Landmark (#134) in August 1988, as examples of small, slow-speed 19th century geared locomotives.

- Locomotive #1: Built in 1912, it was originally owned by the Alaculsy Lumber Company, and was used on the Smokey Mountain Railroad in Tennessee. The Dixiana is named for a small narrow-gauge mining railroad, now abandoned, out of Dixiana, Virginia. Notable characteristics include the boiler, which was set left of centerline to compensate for the weight and position of the engine – giving it a lopsided appearance – and the engine design of a three-cylinder exhaust system.
- Locomotive #2: Built in 1899 for the Hetch Hetchy Valley and Yosemite Railroad for use at the sawmill of West Side Flume and Lumber Company near Tuolumne City. First named Thomas S. Bullock after the first general manager of the West Side Flume and Lumber Company, the locomotive was purchased for Roaring Camp in 1962 for $7,000. It is the last steam engine used in the commercial lumber business in Tuolumne, California, and the oldest Heisler still in operation.
- Locomotive #5: The Bloomsburg was built in 1928 for the Elk River Coal and Lumber Company in Swandale, West Virginia. Previous owners include W.M. Ritter Lumber Company, Georgia Pacific Railroad, and the Carroll Park and Western Railroad in Bloomsburg, Pennsylvania until bought for Roaring Camp in 1975. It is thought to be the last locomotive of its type manufactured by Climax that operated for logging in the west.

Other notes

- Locomotive #7 was out-shopped on the same day as another Shay locomotive which operated in the Santa Cruz Mountains, the Class B SN-2461. It was acquired by the Santa Cruz Lumber Company in 1930 and hauled lumber along the Pescadero Creek until 1950. The Shay would be stored until it was scrapped in 1954. Her sister would arrive at the Santa Cruz Mountains some 30 years later.

== See also ==
- List of heritage railroads in the United States
- Logging railroad
- Santa Cruz, Big Trees and Pacific Railway
- Santa Cruz Railroad
- U.S. common-carrier narrow gauges in the twentieth century
