= Felton, California =

Felton
- census-designated place
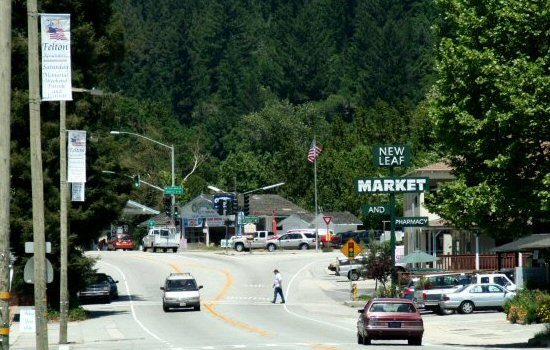
- Downtown Felton

- Location in Santa Cruz County and the state of California

- Location in the United States
- Coordinates: 37°3′5″N 122°3′21″W
- Country: United States
- State: California
- County: Santa Cruz

Area
  - Total: 4.640 sq mi (12.017 km^{2})
  - Land: 4.640 sq mi (12.017 km^{2})
  - Water: 0 sq mi (0 km^{2}) 0%
- Elevation: 285 ft (87 m)

Population (2020)
  - Total: 4,489
  - Density: 967.5/sq mi (373.6/km^{2})
- Time zone: UTC-8 (PST)
  - Summer (DST): UTC-7 (PDT)
- ZIP code: 95018
- Area code: 831
- FIPS code: 06-23826
- GNIS feature ID: 0277512

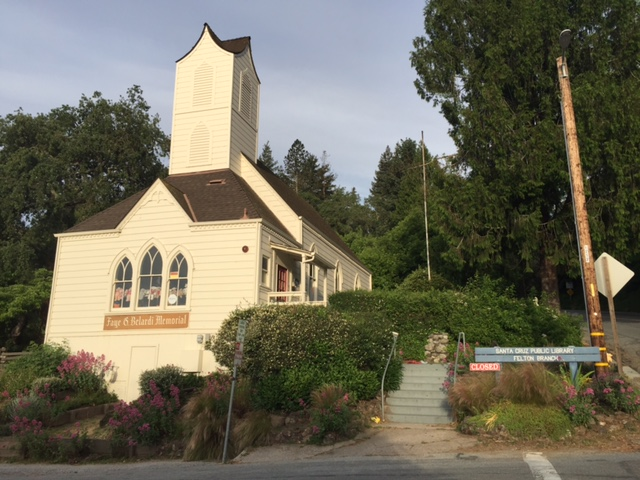
Felton Museum on Gushee Street

Felton is a census-designated place (CDP) in Santa Cruz County, California, United States. The population was 4,489 as of 2020 census and according to the United States Census Bureau, the CDP has a total area of 4.6 square miles (12 km^{2}), all of it land.

== History ==
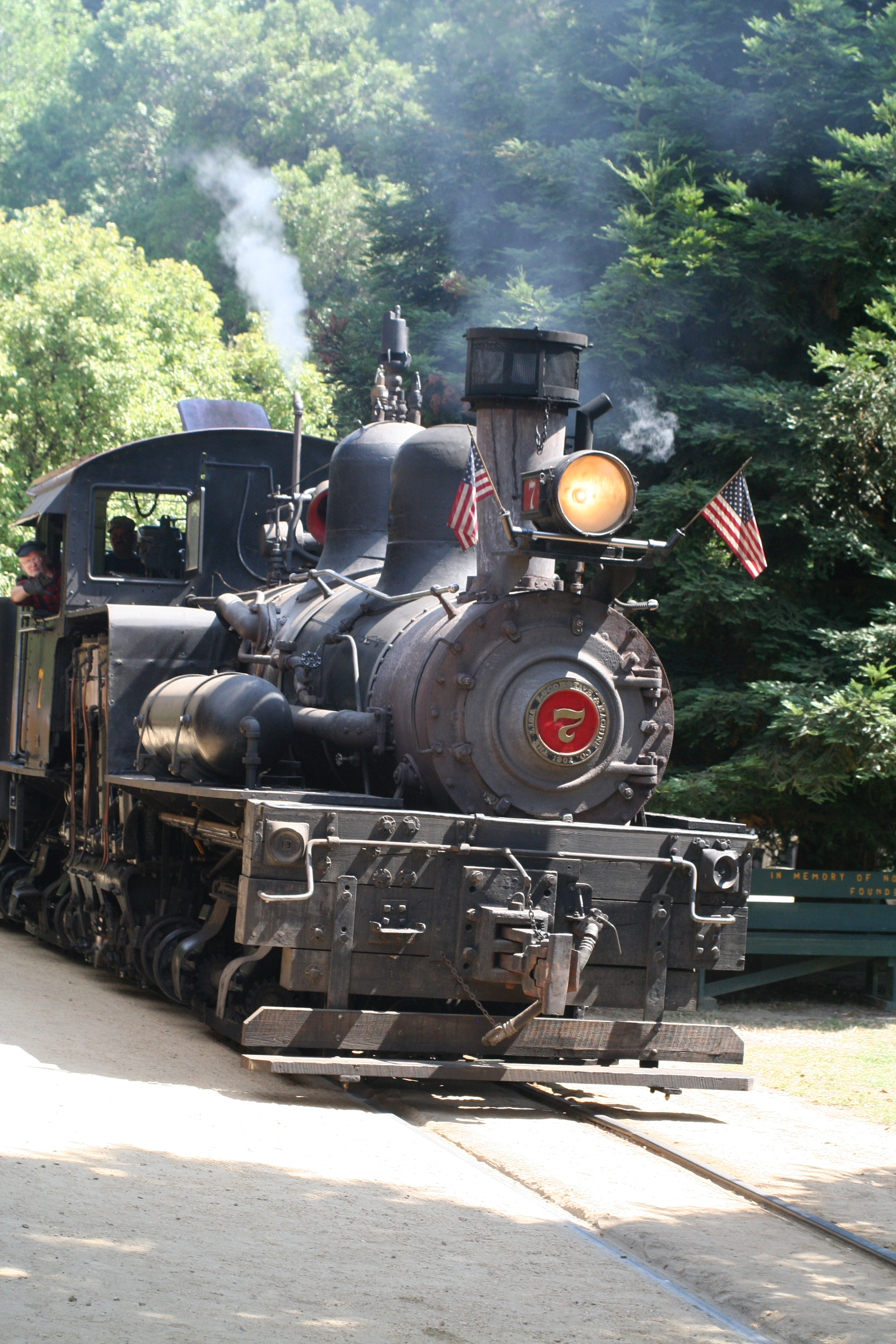
Big Trees Narrow Gauge Railroad

Felton is part of the traditional territory of the Sayant, an Awaswas-speaking group considered part of the Ohlone people. Most of the Sayant were sent to Mission Santa Cruz and the area of the San Lorenzo Valley remained unpopulated except for occasional travelers. In 1833, Rancho Zayante was established at the confluence of the San Lorenzo River and Zayante Creek and granted to Joaquín Buelna. The rancho subsequently passed to Francisco Moss in 1839, then Joseph L. Majors on April 22, 1841. Majors acquired it on behalf of Isaac Graham, who operated a lumber mill on the property.

In the aftermath of California statehood in 1850, the California Gold Rush expanded outward, eventually reaching the San Lorenzo Valley. Gold was struck along western tributaries of the San Lorenzo River such as Gold Gulch. These miners, combined with lumbermen and their families, began a community known in early days as "San Lorenzo." After Graham died in 1863, his lawyer Edward Stanly oversaw the subdivision of his estate. In 1868, he hired Horace Gushee to subdivide the property and Frederick A. Hihn to promote it. Gushee was a director of the failed San Lorenzo Railroad scheme and planned to make the community into the terminus for the railroad. In 1868, he or Stanly named the town Felton, probably after former Oakland mayor John B. Felton, who may have been an investor.

Although the railroad was never built, Felton continued to grow as a town focused on the lumber, lime, and mining industries. In 1875, it became the southern terminus of the San Lorenzo Valley Logging Flume from Boulder Creek, and the northern terminus of the Santa Cruz and Felton Railroad to Santa Cruz. and when formally opened in October 1875 was augmented by a new rail line to transport logs to the wharf in Santa Cruz. To enable it to negotiate on better terms with the South Pacific Coast Railroad, Felton was incorporated as a town by the Legislature on March 8, 1878. This gamble did not pay off and the new railroad established a depot across the San Lorenzo River at a site nicknamed "New Felton" by locals. In 1917, Felton was disincorporated by an act of the Legislature, relinquishing corporate responsibilities to the county of Santa Cruz.

In 1927, the Felton community of Lompico, California, was established.

In 1963, the steam-powered Roaring Camp Railroad began tourist operations on the Big Trees Ranch out of the Old Felton Depot. The company later constructed a replica logging camp and another depot farther down the property, and in 1985, took over operations on the old SPC/Southern Pacific standard gauge line to Santa Cruz. Roaring Camp is a re-creation of an 1880s logging camp and home to the original South Pacific Coast (later Southern Pacific) Felton depot and freight shed, as well as two unique railroads — the Roaring Camp and Big Trees Narrow Gauge Railroad, a steam-powered line up Bear Mountain, and the Santa Cruz, Big Trees and Pacific Railway.

Felton is home to the Felton Covered Bridge, an 80-foot-long covered bridge over the San Lorenzo River built in 1892 and placed on the National Register of Historic Places in 1973.

Scenes from the 1975 Disney movie "Escape to Witch Mountain" were filmed in Felton.

The Trout Farm Inn was located in Felton. It burned down on June 5, 2016. It reopened in 2022.

The local high school is San Lorenzo Valley High School. The 2007 boys basketball team won the only Boys Basketball SCCAL Championship in school history.

On August 20, 2020, at 8:00 AM Pacific Time, due to the CZU Lightning Incident fires of 2020, Felton was ordered to evacuate by the California Department of Forestry and Fire Protection.

== Demographics ==
Historical population
Census	Pop.	Note	%±
1880	271		—
1890	259		−4.4%
1960	1,380		—
1970	2,062		49.4%
1980	4,564		121.3%
1990	5,350		17.2%
2000	1,051		−80.4%
2010	4,057		286.0%
2020	4,489		10.6%
U.S. Decennial Census; 1860–1870 1880-1890; 1900 1910 1920; 1930 1940 1950; 1960 1970 1980; 1990 2000 2010; 2020

Felton first appeared as an unincorporated community in the 1960 U.S. census; and as a census-designated place in the 1980 United States census.

=== Racial and ethnic composition ===
Felton CDP, California – Racial and ethnic composition Note: the US Census treats Hispanic/Latino as an ethnic category. This table excludes Latinos from the racial categories and assigns them to a separate category. Hispanics/Latinos may be of any race.
Race / Ethnicity (NH = Non-Hispanic)	Pop 2000	Pop 2010	Pop 2020	% 2000	% 2010	% 2020
White alone (NH)	915	3,513	3,422	87.06%	86.59%	76.23%
Black or African American alone (NH)	7	25	31	0.67%	0.62%	0.69%
Native American or Alaska Native alone (NH)	5	23	16	0.48%	0.57%	0.36%
Asian alone (NH)	15	65	74	1.43%	1.60%	1.65%
Native Hawaiian or Pacific Islander alone (NH)	1	8	3	0.10%	0.20%	0.07%
Other race alone (NH)	3	10	47	0.29%	0.25%	1.05%
Mixed race or Multiracial (NH)	30	130	299	2.85%	3.20%	6.66%
Hispanic or Latino (any race)	75	283	597	7.14%	6.98%	13.30%
Total	1,051	4,057	4,489	100.00%	100.00%	100.00%

=== 2020 census ===
As of the 2020 census, Felton had a population of 4,489 and a population density of 967.5 inhabitants per square mile (373.6/km^{2}).

The age distribution was 17.0% under the age of 18, 6.9% aged 18 to 24, 25.8% aged 25 to 44, 30.6% aged 45 to 64, and 19.7% who were 65 years of age or older. The median age was 45.3 years. For every 100 females, there were 99.2 males, and for every 100 females age 18 and over there were 100.4 males.

The census reported that 95.6% of the population lived in households, 4.4% lived in non-institutionalized group quarters, and no one was institutionalized. It also reported that 94.9% of residents lived in urban areas, while 5.1% lived in rural areas.

There were 1,749 households, out of which 26.0% included children under the age of 18, 48.3% were married-couple households, 8.6% were cohabiting couple households, 24.4% had a female householder with no partner present, and 18.8% had a male householder with no partner present. 26.9% of households were one person, and 11.1% were one person aged 65 or older. The average household size was 2.45. There were 1,110 families (63.5% of all households).

There were 1,885 housing units at an average density of 406.2 units per square mile (156.8 units/km^{2}), of which 1,749 (92.8%) were occupied. Of occupied units, 70.8% were owner-occupied and 29.2% were occupied by renters. The homeowner vacancy rate was 0.6%, and the rental vacancy rate was 1.0%.

=== Income and poverty ===
In 2023, the US Census Bureau estimated that the median household income was $117,375, and the per capita income was $67,505. About 1.4% of families and 3.9% of the population were below the poverty line.

=== 2010 census ===
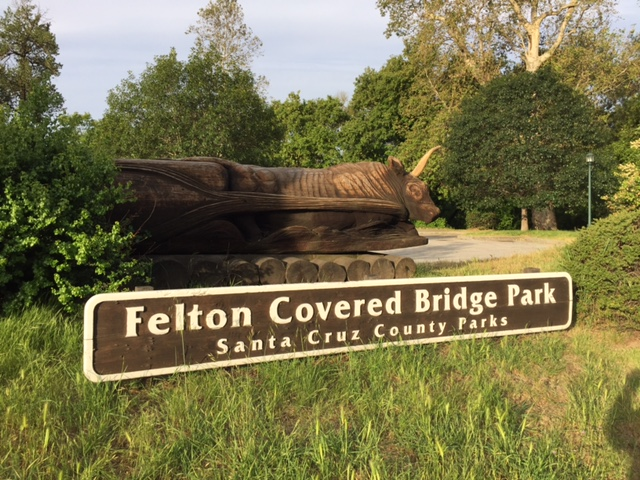
Felton Covered Bridge Park

The 2010 United States census reported that Felton had a population of 4,057. The population density was 891.2 inhabitants per square mile (344.1/km^{2}). The racial makeup of Felton was 3,691 (91.0%) White, 25 (0.6%) African American, 29 (0.7%) Native American, 69 (1.7%) Asian, 11 (0.3%) Pacific Islander, 60 (1.5%) from other races, and 172 (4.2%) from two or more races. Hispanic or Latino of any race were 283 persons (7.0%).

The Census reported that 99.4% of the population lived in households and 0.6% lived in non-institutionalized group quarters.

There were 1,700 households, out of which 450 (26.5%) had children under the age of 18 living in them, 795 (46.8%) were opposite-sex married couples living together, 124 (7.3%) had a female householder with no husband present, 69 (4.1%) had a male householder with no wife present. There were 154 (9.1%) unmarried opposite-sex partnerships, and 27 (1.6%) same-sex married couples or partnerships. 474 households (27.9%) were made up of individuals, and 130 (7.6%) had someone living alone who was 65 years of age or older. The average household size was 2.37. There were 988 families (58.1% of all households); the average family size was 2.89.

The population was spread out, with 738 people (18.2%) under the age of 18, 300 people (7.4%) aged 18 to 24, 1,048 people (25.8%) aged 25 to 44, 1,560 people (38.5%) aged 45 to 64, and 411 people (10.1%) who were 65 years of age or older. The median age was 44.0 years. For every 100 females, there were 101.1 males. For every 100 females age 18 and over, there were 99.5 males.

There were 1,895 housing units at an average density of 416.3 per square mile (160.7/km^{2}), of which 69.5% were owner-occupied and 30.5% were occupied by renters. The homeowner vacancy rate was 2.1%; the rental vacancy rate was 3.0%. 72.8% of the population lived in owner-occupied housing units and 26.6% lived in rental housing units.

=== 2000 census ===
As of the 2000 census, there were 1051 people and 517 households in the CDP. The population density was 1,133.0 people per square mile (436.3/km^{2}). There were 173 housing units at an average density of 189.3 per square mile (214.6/km^{2}). The racial makeup of the CDP was 90.58% White, 0.67% African American, 0.57% Native American, 1.43% Asian, 0.10% Pacific Islander, 3.33% from other races, and 3.33% from two or more races. Hispanic or Latino of any race were 7.14% of the population.

There were 393 households out of which 29.3% had children under the age of 18 living with them, 53.2% were married couples living together, 8.7% had a female householder with no husband present, and 34.9% were non-families. 25.4% of all households were made up of individuals and 4.6% had someone living alone who was 65 years of age or older. The average household size was 2.57 and the average family size was 3.06.

In the CDP, the population was spread out with 26.5% under the age of 18, 10.8% from 18 to 24, 29.7% from 25 to 44, 23.3% from 45 to 64, and 9.6% who were 65 years of age or older. The median age was 34 years. For every 100 females, there were 104.1 males. For every 100 females age 18 and over, there were 97.4 males.

The median income for a household in the CDP was $48,102, and the median income for a family was $55,625. Males had a median income of $35,833 versus $26,346 for females. The per capita income for the CDP was $21,488. About 8.3% of families and 15.8% of the population were below the poverty line, including 20.0% of those under age 18 and none of those age 65 or over.

== Government ==
In the California State Legislature, Felton is in the 17th senatorial district, represented by Democrat John Laird, and in the 28th Assembly district, represented by Democrat Gail Pellerin.

In the United States House of Representatives, Felton is in California's 19th congressional district, represented by Democrat Jimmy Panetta.

== Economy ==
A Graniterock quarry is located in Felton, southwest of downtown.
