= California landslides =

Landslides in California occur mainly due to intense rainfall but occasionally are triggered by earthquakes. Landslides are common in Southern California, the San Francisco Bay Area and other parts of Northern California, and the Sierra Nevada. Although they most often are reported when they impact residential developments, landslides also damage roads, railroads, pipelines, electrical lines, and other infrastructure throughout the state, and occur in unoccupied parts of the state.

== California Geological Survey ==
CGS is California's primary source of geologic and seismologic products and services for decision making by California's government agencies, its businesses and the public. Since the 1960s, when it was known as the California Division of Mines and Geology, CGS has produced many maps that depict landslide features and potential slope-failure areas. CGS products have included geologic maps and reports for land-use planning, landslide hazard identification maps, watershed maps, and earthquake-triggered landslide-zone maps. Many of these maps were advisory in nature: cities and counties could choose to use or ignore them. However, watershed maps are routinely used in the review of timber harvest plans outside federally owned lands. CGS has a legislatively mandated Seismic Hazards Zonation Program that produces regulatory maps areas where the probability of liquefaction and earthquake-triggered landslides are significant enough to require site evaluation prior to most developments.

== Landslide maps in California and laws and regulations ==
The State of California Department of Conservation produces regulatory maps showing locations where the hazard from earthquake-triggered landslides must be evaluated prior to specific types of land-use development in accordance with provisions of Public Resources Code, Section 2690 et seq. (Seismic Hazards Mapping Act). These maps and related products incorporate evaluations of probabilistic ground shaking and existing geologic conditions. Recently released landslide inventory and related hazard zone maps are available free from the CGS website. Watershed maps, used in the review of timber harvest plans (regulated by the California Department of Forestry) are available for downloading in PDF and GIS data formats.

From 1983 through 1994, CGS was directed to produce Landslide Hezard Identification Maps under the State's Landslide Hazard Identification Act. Though of high quality and designed for land-use planning purposes, the Act did not require local governments to use the maps. The Act was repealed January 1, 1995 per a sunset provision in the Act. Those maps, and many older non-regulatory landslide-related products are available for purchase from CGS offices and/or available for download from the CGS website.

== List of historic California landslides ==
- The 1906 San Francisco earthquake reportedly triggered numerous landslides, including one at Devil's Slide, where the Ocean Shore Railroad had parked more than $1 million in construction equipment. All of that equipment was lost because of landslide movement.
- Devil's Slide, an ongoing landslide in San Mateo County
- Ferguson landslide
- Point Fermin area of San Pedro, California
- Palos Verdes Peninsula Landslides, including Portuguese Bend
- Truttman Sink
- Verdugo Hills Cemetery landslide, 1978
- January 3–5, 1982 landslides in San Francisco Bay Area. Landslides killed 25 people and caused at least $66 million in damage. Ten people were killed at Love Creek, near Ben Lomond.
- 1996 Yosemite Valley landslide
- La Conchita landslides in La Conchita, on January 10, 2005, killed 10 people and destroyed 18 homes.
- Camarillo Springs, Ventura County, December 2014
- 2018 Southern California mudflows
- State Route 1 – Landslides

== See also ==
- Deformation monitoring
