= List of California floods =

History of floods in California

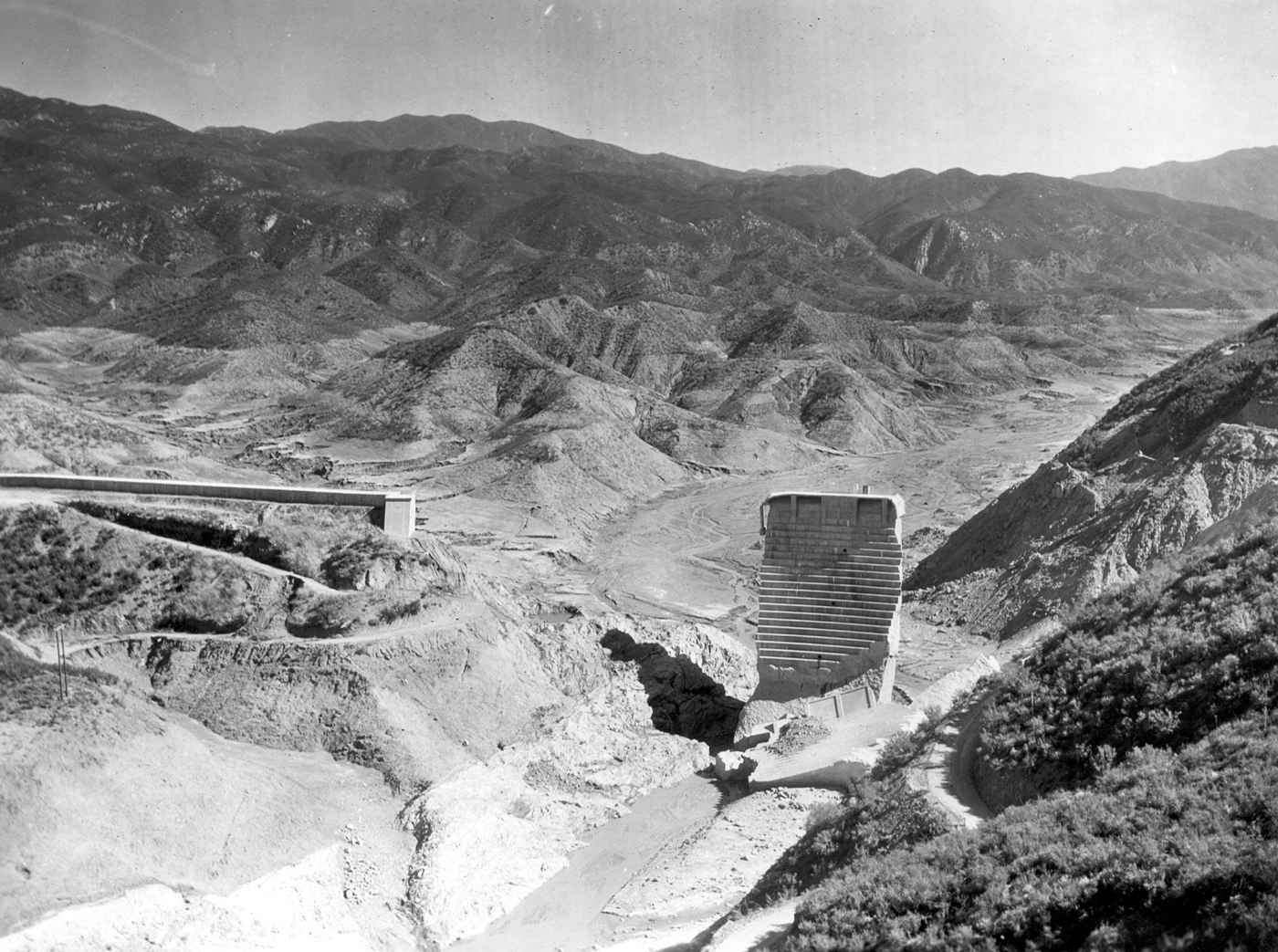
The remains of the St. Francis Dam and reservoir floor, which killed more than 400 people after it failed in March 1928

All types of floods can occur in California, though 90 percent of them are caused by river flooding in lowland areas. Such flooding generally occurs as a result of excessive rainfall, excessive snowmelt, excessive runoff, levee failure, tsunami, poor planning or built infrastructure, or a combination of these factors. Below is a list of flood events that were of significant impact to California.

== Background and climatology ==
Every county in California has experienced a flood, which is mostly likely to be caused by an atmospheric river, which is a narrow corridor of moisture in the air that travels a long distance to produce heavy rainfall. As of 2024, the state of California spends more than US$2.8 billion annually on maintaining or building flood control projects.

== Events ==
=== Pre–1900 ===
Geologic evidence indicates that "megafloods" occurred in the California region in the following years A.D.: 212, 440, 603, 1029, c. 1300, 1418, 1605, and 1750. Prior to European settlement, these early floods predominantly affected the indigenous peoples of California.

- 1605 – A large flood occurred due to an unusually powerful atmospheric river. This was potentially the largest flooding event in the state of the prior 2,000 years.
- 1825 – This flood changed the course of the Los Angeles River from its western outlet into Santa Monica Bay following the course of Ballona Creek to a southern outlet at San Pedro Bay near where it is today.
- January 1850 – A major flood devastated the then new city of Sacramento; rain from heavy storms saturated the ground upon which Sacramento was built, and the American and Sacramento rivers crested simultaneously.
- October 2, 1858 – A hurricane near San Diego washed ships ashore.
- December 24, 1861 – February 1862 – The largest flood in California's history occurred, lasting for 45 days, reaching full flood stage in different areas between January 9–12, 1862. The entire Sacramento and San Joaquin valleys were inundated for 300 miles (480 km), averaging 20 miles (32 km) in breadth. State government was forced to relocate from the capital in Sacramento for 18 months to San Francisco. The rain created an inland sea in Orange County, lasting about three weeks with water standing 4 feet (1.2 m) deep up to 4 miles (6 km) from the river. The Los Angeles basin was flooded from the San Gabriel Mountains to the Palos Verdes Peninsula, at variable depths, excluding the higher lands which became islands until the waters receded. The Los Angeles basin lost 200,000 cattle by way of drowning, as well as homes, ranches, farm crops and vineyards being swept-away.

=== 1900–1949 ===
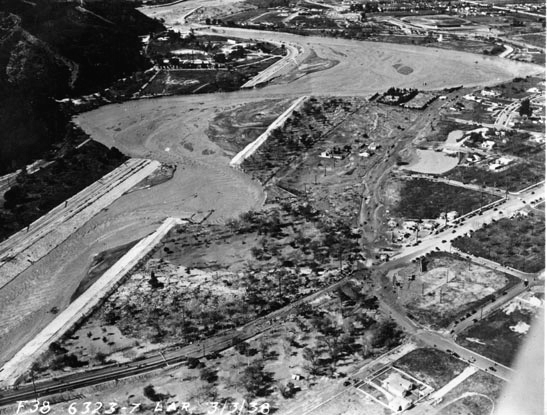
The Los Angeles River overflowing its banks near Griffith Park, in 1938

- 1909 – The storm extended from Fort Ross along the Sacramento River up to the Feather River basin. One small town along the flood path (La Porte) was inundated with 57.41 inches (1,458 mm) over the course of 20 days. The flood episodes of 1907 and 1909 in California resulted in an overhaul of planned statewide flood control designs.
- March 1928 – The recently constructed St. Francis Dam collapsed 40 miles northwest of downtown Los Angeles due to a combination of faulty design and a defective soil foundation. The flooding downstream from the dam killed at least 431 people, making it the third-greatest loss of life events in California.
- Late December 1933 – The Crescenta Valley flooding occurred after 12 inches (300 mm) of rain fell in the communities of La Crescenta, La Cañada and Montrose just north of Los Angeles. On New Year's Eve, more rain fell. The result was a flood of mud and water that began around midnight, destroying more than 400 homes in the area. This was commemorated in Woody Guthrie's song "Los Angeles New Year's Flood". As a result of this flood, the Army Corps of Engineers and the County of Los Angeles built a flood control system of catch basins and concrete storm drains to prevent a repeat of the disaster.
- February 4–7, 1937 – A storm resulted in the highest four-day rainfall totals at several stations in the Santa Ana River basin. The Riverside North station had over 8 inches (200 mm) of rain in that four days, which equaled a 450-year event. Other stations also received high amounts of rain within those four days.
- December 1937 – The storm of December 1937 was a high-elevation event in the northeast corner of the state.
- February–March 1938 – Flood in Los Angeles was caused by two Pacific storms that swept across the Los Angeles Basin in and generated almost one year's worth of precipitation in just a few days. Between 113–115 people were killed by the flooding. The Los Angeles, San Gabriel, and Santa Ana Rivers burst their banks, inundating much of the coastal plain, the San Fernando and San Gabriel Valleys, and the Inland Empire. Flood control structures spared parts of Los Angeles County from destruction, while Orange and Riverside Counties experienced more damage. The flood of 1938 is considered a 50-year flood. It caused $78 million of damage ($1.78 billion in 2025 dollars), making it one of the costliest natural disasters in Los Angeles' history. In response to the floods, the U.S. Army Corps of Engineers and other agencies began to channelize local streams in concrete, and built many new flood control dams and debris basins. These works have been instrumental in protecting Southern California from subsequent flooding events, such as in 1969 and 2005, which both had a larger volume than the 1938 flood.
- September 25, 1939 – A tropical storm known as El Cordonazo, or The Lash of St. Francis, made landfall near Long Beach with sustained winds of 50 mph (85 km/h), which as of 2025 is the most recent tropical storm landfall in California. The storm killed 45 people across southern California, and another 48 people at sea, with residents caught unprepared. Rains related to the storm reached 11.60 in (295 mm) at Mount Wilson. Floodwaters 2 ft (0.61 m) deep inundated the eastern Coachella Valley. Damage reached $2 million.

=== 1950s ===
- November 1950 – a statewide disaster was declared November 21 when floods caused 9 deaths and $32 million in damage.
- December 1955 – The 1955 Yuba–Sutter floods affected the central Sierra Nevada mountains and South Bay areas. The Eel River on the North Coast saw the greatest flow of record to that time while Central Valley rivers saw near-record flows. A statewide disaster was declared, with the storm resulting in 74 deaths and $200 million in economic losses. The heaviest 24-hour rainfall was recorded on December 20, when 15.34 inches (390 mm) fell in Shasta County. The storm's toll on Sutter County was severe. At 12:04 a.m. on December 24, 1955, a levee on the west bank of the Feather River, at Shanghai Bend, collapsed and a wall of water 21 feet high entered the county, flooding 90 percent of Yuba City and the farmlands in the southern Yuba City basin. Some 600 people were rescued by helicopter and 37 people drowned.

=== 1960s ===
- October 1962 – The atmospheric river associated with the Columbus Day storm produced flooding and mudslides, particularly in the San Francisco Bay Area. Oakland set an all time calendar day record with 4.52 inches (115 mm) of rain on the 13th, as did Sacramento with 3.77 inches (96 mm). More than 7 inches (180 mm) of rainfall were recorded in the Bay area. Heavy rain forced Game 6 of the 1962 World Series at San Francisco's Candlestick Park to be postponed from its originally scheduled date of October 11 to Monday, October 15.
- March 1964 – A powerful earthquake in Alaska produced a tsunami, devastating several North Coast towns and resulting in 14 deaths and an economic loss of $14 million in Del Norte County alone.
- December 19–24, 1964 – Christmas flood of 1964 occurred along the North Coast, the result of six days of heavy rainfall. Every major stream in the North Coast produced new high values of extreme peak flows. 34 California counties were declared disaster areas.

=== 1970s ===
- September 10, 1976 – The remnants of Hurricane Kathleen produced 14.76 in (375 mm) of rainfall along the southern slopes of Mount San Gorgonio, which marked the highest known precipitation related to an Atlantic or Pacific hurricane in the state. Flooding inundated the Coachella and Imperial Valleys, with six people killed in Ocotillo, after 70% of the town was buried in mud. The floods also washed out portions of roads, including I-8. Damage in the state was estimated at over $120 million.
- August 15–17, 1977 – Former Hurricane Doreen dissipated near San Clemente Island, after bringing a plume of moisture that spread across southern California. The highest rainfall was 7.63 in (194 mm) along Mt. San Jacinto. The storm killed four people and caused $25 million in damage, with hundreds of houses flooded.

=== 1980s ===
- January 3–5, 1982 – Heavy rainfall in the San Francisco Bay region on January 3–5 triggered floods across the state. The floods caused thousands of debris flows from Santa Cruz Country to Contra Costa and Sonoma Counties, as well as flooding along the San Lorenzo River, Soquel Creek, and Aptos Creek in Santa Cruz County. Floods along creeks in Marin County added significant amounts of sediment to Tomales Bay. The landslides caused at least $66 million in damage. Landslides caused 25 of the 33 storm-caused deaths. Total estimated storm-related losses were $280 million.
- February 1986 – On February 11, 1986, a vigorous low pressure system drifted east out of the Pacific, creating a Pineapple Express that lasted through February 24 unleashing unprecedented amounts of rain on northern California and western Nevada. The nine-day storm over California constituted half of the average annual rainfall for the year. Record flooding occurred in three streams that drain to the southern part of the San Francisco Bay area. Extensive flooding occurred in the Napa and Russian rivers. Napa, north of San Francisco, recorded its worst flood to this time while nearby Calistoga recorded 29 inches (740 mm) of rain in 10 days, creating a once-in-a-thousand-year rainfall event. Records for 24-hour rain events were reported in the Central Valley and in the Sierra. Thousand-year rainfalls were recorded in the Sierras. The heaviest 24-hour rainfall ever recorded in the Central Valley at 17.60 inches (447 mm) occurred on February 17 at Four Trees in the Feather River basin. In Sacramento, nearly 10 inches (250 mm) of rain fell in an 11-day period. System breaks in the Sacramento River basin included disastrous levee breaks in the Olivehurst and Linda area on the Feather River. Linda, about 40 miles (64 km) north of Sacramento, was devastated after the levee broke on the Yuba River's south fork, forcing thousands of residents to evacuate. In the San Joaquin River basin and the Delta, levee breaks along the Mokelumne River caused flooding in the community of Thornton and the inundation of four Delta islands. Lake Tahoe rose 6 inches (150 mm) as a result of high inflow. The California flood resulted in 13 deaths, 50,000 people evacuated and over $400 million in property damage. 3000 residents of Linda joined in a class action lawsuit Paterno v. State of California, which eventually reached the California Supreme Court in 2004. The California high court affirmed the District Court of Appeal's decision that said California was liable for millions of dollars in damages.

=== 1990s ===
- January and March 1995 – Over 100 stations recorded their greatest 1-day rainfalls in that station's history. The major brunt of the January storms hit the Sacramento River Basin and resulted in small stream flooding primarily due to storm drainage system failures, though flooding affected nearly every part of the state. The Salinas River exceeded its previous measured record crest by more than four feet, which was within a foot or two of the reputed crest of the legendary 1862 flood. The Napa River set a new peak record, and the Russian and Pajaro rivers approached their record peaks. 28 people were killed and the flood cost $1.8 billion. The flooding also affected Southern California.
- December 26, 1996 – mid-late January 1997 – Flooding around New Years day was fed by an atmospheric river. It impacted Northern California, resulting in some of the most devastating flooding since the Great Flood of 1862. Similarly to the 1862 event, the flooding was a combined effect of heavy rainfall and excessive snowmelt of the relatively large early-season Sierra Nevada snowpack. The resulting flooding in the Central Valley and other low-lying areas forced over 120,000 people from their homes and caused over $2 billion in property damage alone. 48 out of California's 58 counties were declared disaster areas with many streamflow gauge stations in these areas recording return intervals of over 100 years. It would take months for the worst-hit areas to recover fully.
- February 2–3, 1998 – San Francisquito Creek overflowed during a strong El Niño storm, flooding approximately 1,100 homes in East Palo Alto, Palo Alto, and Menlo Park. Peak discharge at the USGS Stanford gauge reached approximately 7,100 cubic feet per second, with documented damage of $28–40 million.

=== 2000s ===
- January 2005 – The Los Angeles County flood of 2005 was the first large flood in Los Angeles County since 1938. It affected communities near the Los Angeles River and areas ranging from Santa Barbara County in the north to Orange and San Diego Counties in the south, as well as Riverside and San Bernardino Counties to the east. Large amounts of rain in January caused the Los Angeles River basin to overflow. The Ventura, Santa Ynez, and Santa Clara Rivers also flooded.

=== 2010s ===
- August 26–29, 2014 – Large swells from Hurricane Marie caused high waves that killed a surfer in Malibu.
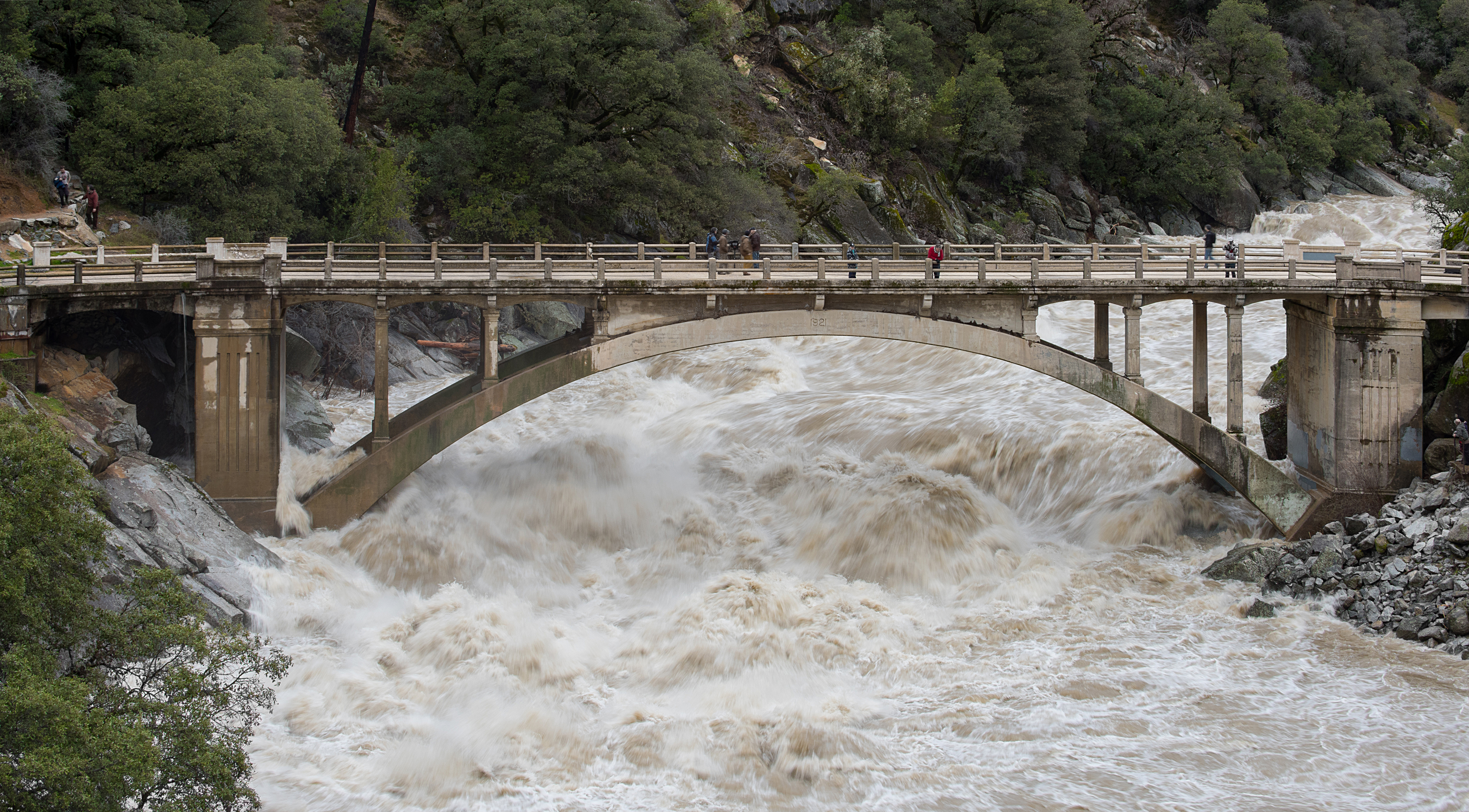
  The South Yuba River at Highway 49 floods after heavy rain on January 9, 2017. The flow is about 25,000 cubic feet per second (710 m^{3}/s), more than 40 times the normal rate.
- January 2017 – Flooding at the beginning of the year affected mostly Northern California, which saw its wettest winter in almost a century, breaking the record set in 1982–1983 El Nino event. The damage to California roads and highways was estimated at more than $1.05 billion. The flooding occurred at the end of one of California's worst droughts on record, and much of the state was unprepared to handle the huge volume of rain and snow. The precipitation helped to refill surface water supplies, including many major lakes and reservoirs, but had limited impact on groundwater reserves. Governor Jerry Brown declared the drought officially over on April 4, 2017. The Russian River near Sacramento, California rose three feet above flood stage, overspreading about 500 houses with water. Dams were opened to relieve pressure from built-up floodwaters, with the Sacramento Weir being opened for the first time in eleven years. Numerous areas in Northern California closed roads to flood and mudslide conditions, with U.S. Route 395 temporarily closed in both directions. Over 570,000 customers of the Pacific Gas and Electric Company lost power in Northern and Central California during the event. Over 3,000 people in the Guerneville area were evacuated. The high-amplitude ridge off the West Coast that characterized the preceding drought was replaced by a persistent presence of anomalous troughs impacting California. Another feature in the 2013–2015 winters was the extreme temperature contrast between a warm western U.S. and a cold eastern continent. These anomalous temperature and circulation patterns were referred to as the North American winter "dipole". Figure (a) shows the climatological geopotential height (Z) overlaid with its eddy component, in which the dipole centers are located (indicated by X and +). The dipole basically describes the wintertime stationary waves over North America, which contribute to the mean temperature difference between the climatologically warmer western U.S. and colder eastern half. Therefore, an amplification of the stationary wave would enhance such a temperature difference, like in 2013–2015 winters, while a weakening of the stationary wave would reverse the situation, like in 2016–2017 winter. Indeed, in winter 2016–2017 this dipole was apparently reversed.
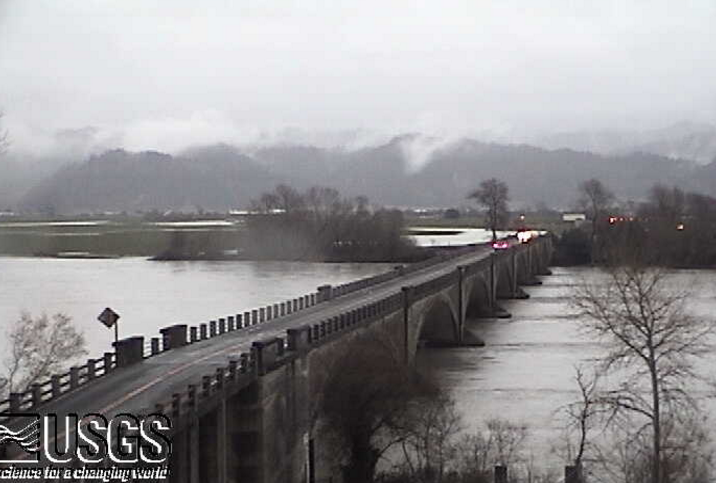
  The United States Geological Survey maintains a camera on top of Humboldt Creamery in Fernbridge, California which shows the Eel River in flood stage on February 8, 2017. The flood was significantly smaller than the floods of 1955 and 1964.
- February 2017 – The Oroville Dam crisis occurred after heavy rainfall damaged Oroville Dam's main and emergency spillways, prompting the evacuation of more than 180,000 people living downstream along the Feather River and the relocation of a fish hatchery. Heavy rainfall during the 2017 California floods damaged the main spillway on February 7, so the California Department of Water Resources stopped the spillway flow to assess the damage and contemplate its next steps. The rain eventually raised the lake level until it flowed over the emergency spillway, even after the damaged main spillway was reopened. As water flowed over the emergency spillway, headward erosion threatened to undermine and collapse the concrete weir, which could have sent a 30-foot (10 m) wall of water into the Feather River below and flooded communities downstream. No collapse occurred, but the water further damaged the main spillway and eroded the bare slope of the emergency spillway. The same storms caused the Eel River to flood at Fernbridge near Ferndale.

=== 2020s ===
- December 31, 2022 – March 25, 2023 – Periods of heavy rainfall caused by multiple atmospheric rivers in California between December 31, 2022, and March 25, 2023, resulted in floods that affected parts of Southern California, the California Central Coast, Northern California and Nevada. The flooding resulted in property damage and at least 22 fatalities. At least 200,000 homes and businesses lost power during the December–January storms and 6,000 individuals were ordered to evacuate. The floods were widely reported by media as an example of how climate change is increasing extreme changes in weather, especially cycles of precipitation and drought. Scientists interviewed by Los Angeles Times said that further study is needed to determine the connection and California has recorded similar events almost every decade since records started in the 19th century. Other scientists have emphasized that floods were caused by ocean warming, directly related to climate change. Scientist Kevin Trenberth declared that "the interaction between the warming ocean and the overlying atmosphere (...) is producing these prodigious rainfalls that have occurred in so many places around the world recently". Climate change is intensifying the water cycle. This brings more intense rainfall and associated flooding, as well as more intense drought in many regions. It has been both predicted by scientists and observed in the last years and documented by the IPCC (International Panel for Climate Change 6th assessment report). Before the rains started, California had been in an extreme drought. Due to the storms, Governor Gavin Newsom declared a state of emergency on January 4, 2023. President Joe Biden then declared a state of emergency in 17 California counties on January 9, 2023. That same day, two lawmakers sent a letter urging President Biden to declare a state of emergency for San Luis Obispo County and Santa Barbara County. Biden approved a major disaster declaration for Santa Cruz, Sacramento and Merced counties on January 14. Monterey, San Luis Obispo and Santa Barbara counties were added a few days later to the declaration. Later, Ventura County was approved for disaster relief. Biden surveyed the damage with Newsom on January 19.
- January 22, 2024 – An atmospheric river impacted San Diego, with its fourth wettest day in San Diego. The city's stormwater system was overwhelmed as its infrastructure was unable to cope with the sudden amount of rain, causing many homes to be flooded and Mayor Todd Gloria to declare a local emergency. The floods displaced 1,225 households in the San Diego region and caused about $31 million in damages.
- February 4, 2024 – In the same atmospheric river, the Los Angeles area received 4.10" inches of rain, causing extreme flooding and mudslides.

== Future ==
A 2022 study found that Climate change in California has potential to increase the extremity of water cycle events such as droughts and megafloods, greatly increasing the severity of future floods due to atmospheric rivers. In part this is due to the expectation that the Sierra Nevada mountains, which typically retain water as snow, will no longer be as cold, reducing snowpack in favor or more runoff. Thus water reserves do not accumulate, leading to drought conditions, even if there is more precipitation.

== See also ==
- El Niño–Southern Oscillation
- Floods in the United States before 1900
- Floods in the United States (1900–1999)
- Floods in the United States (2000–present)
- ARkStorm
- Climate of California
  - List of California hurricanes
  - List of California tornadoes
  - List of California wildfires
