= February 2024 California atmospheric rivers =

Weather event

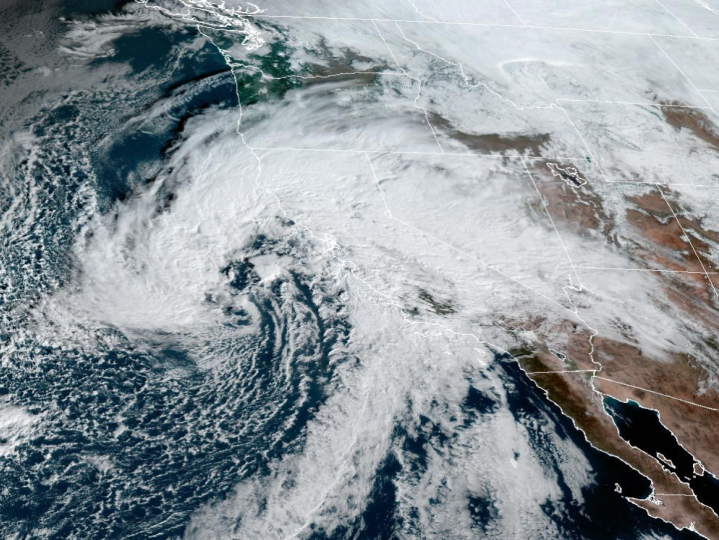
- GOES-West satellite view of the bomb cyclone impacting California on February 4
- Date: February 4–7, 2024
- Location: California
- Cause: Atmospheric river associated with an Extratropical cyclone
- Deaths: 9
- Property damage: ~$3 billion

In early February 2024, two atmospheric rivers brought extensive flooding, intense winds, and power outages to portions of California. The storms caused record-breaking rainfall totals to be observed in multiple areas, as well as the declaration of states of emergency in multiple counties in Southern California. Wind gusts of hurricane force were observed in San Francisco, along with wind gusts reaching over 100 miles per hour (160 km/h) in the Sierra Nevada. Widespread landslides occurred as a result of the storms, as well as multiple rivers overflowing due to the excessive rainfall. Stormchaser Reed Timmer stated that "Biblical flooding" was possible throughout California during the atmospheric river.

== Meteorological history ==
Map plotting the storm's track and intensity, according to the Saffir–Simpson scale Map key Saffir–Simpson scale Tropical depression (≤38 mph, ≤62 km/h) Tropical storm (39–73 mph, 63–118 km/h) Category 1 (74–95 mph, 119–153 km/h) Category 2 (96–110 mph, 154–177 km/h) Category 3 (111–129 mph, 178–208 km/h) Category 4 (130–156 mph, 209–251 km/h) Category 5 (≥157 mph, ≥252 km/h) Unknown Storm type Tropical cyclone Subtropical cyclone Extratropical cyclone, remnant low, tropical disturbance, or monsoon depression

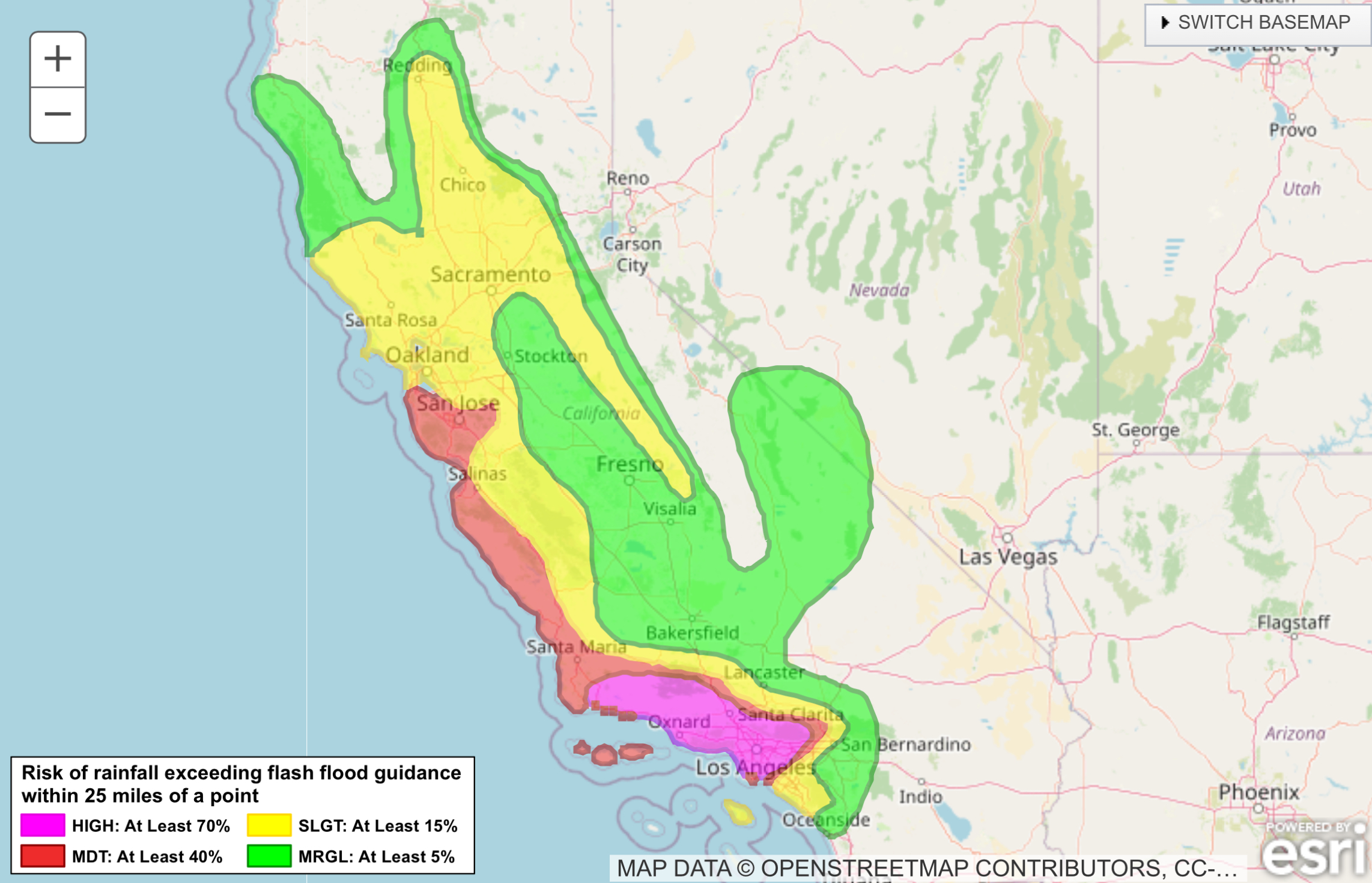
The Weather Prediction Center's Excessive Rainfall Outlook on February 4

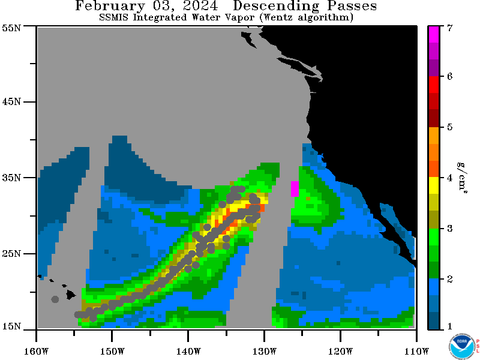
NOAA Automated Atmospheric River Detection Real-time Application to Satellite-Derived IWV Data on February 3

From February 1 to February 2, 2024, California experienced the impact of the first Pineapple Express storm caused by the atmospheric river, which subsequently traversed the United States and settled over the I-25 corridor in Colorado.

Another storm struck on February 4, with the National Weather Service categorizing it as "potentially life-threatening", and forcing Los Angeles into a state of emergency. Seven additional counties declared a state of emergency: Orange County, San Bernardino County, Riverside County, San Diego County, San Luis Obispo County, Santa Barbara County, and Ventura County. The rain was expected to last for days, with some parts of California expected to receive record amounts of rain.

Various news outlets projected that Los Angeles might witness an accumulation of rainfall equivalent to six months' worth between February 3 and February 5. Simultaneously, the Sierra Nevada mountains were anticipated to receive 1 to 3 feet (30 to 91 cm) of snow, while higher elevations, such as Mammoth Lakes, CA, could potentially experience over 4 feet (120 cm) of snow. The NASCAR exhibition race at the Los Angeles Memorial Coliseum was moved forward one day to February 3 from the scheduled February 4 race in anticipation of the rainstorm. Additionally, portions of the San Bernardino Mountains' foothills were expected to receive substantial rainfall, with estimates ranging from 10 to 12 inches (250 to 300 mm). One man was killed on February 4 after a tree struck him due to the winds.

=== February 5 ===
Downtown Los Angeles received 4.1 inches (100 mm) of rain on February 4, 2024, marking it the wettest day since March 15, 2003. Several Malibu, California schools were closed due to inaccessibility because of severe weather causing road closures. Power outages caused by the storms left approximately 850,000 people without power. Fallen trees blocked roads and cut power lines in multiple locations. Wind gusts up to 162 mph (260 km/h) occurred at various high elevation locations, including the Sierra Nevada mountains and Lagunitas Forest. As of February 5, at least three people had died from falling trees.

=== February 6 ===
Downtown Los Angeles had received a total of 7.03 inches (179 mm) of rain in two days from February 4–5 making it the third wettest two-day span in the city's history. For reference, Downtown Los Angeles only averages 14.25 inches (362 mm) of rain in a normal rain year. Heavy rainfall caused more than 300 landslides and severe flash flooding throughout the state. San Diego received record rainfall for California at higher elevations causing floods and prompting road closures. Two tornado warnings would be issued for portions of San Diego County by the National Weather Service due to a severe thunderstorm produced by the storm complex, although no damage would be caused.

=== February 7 ===
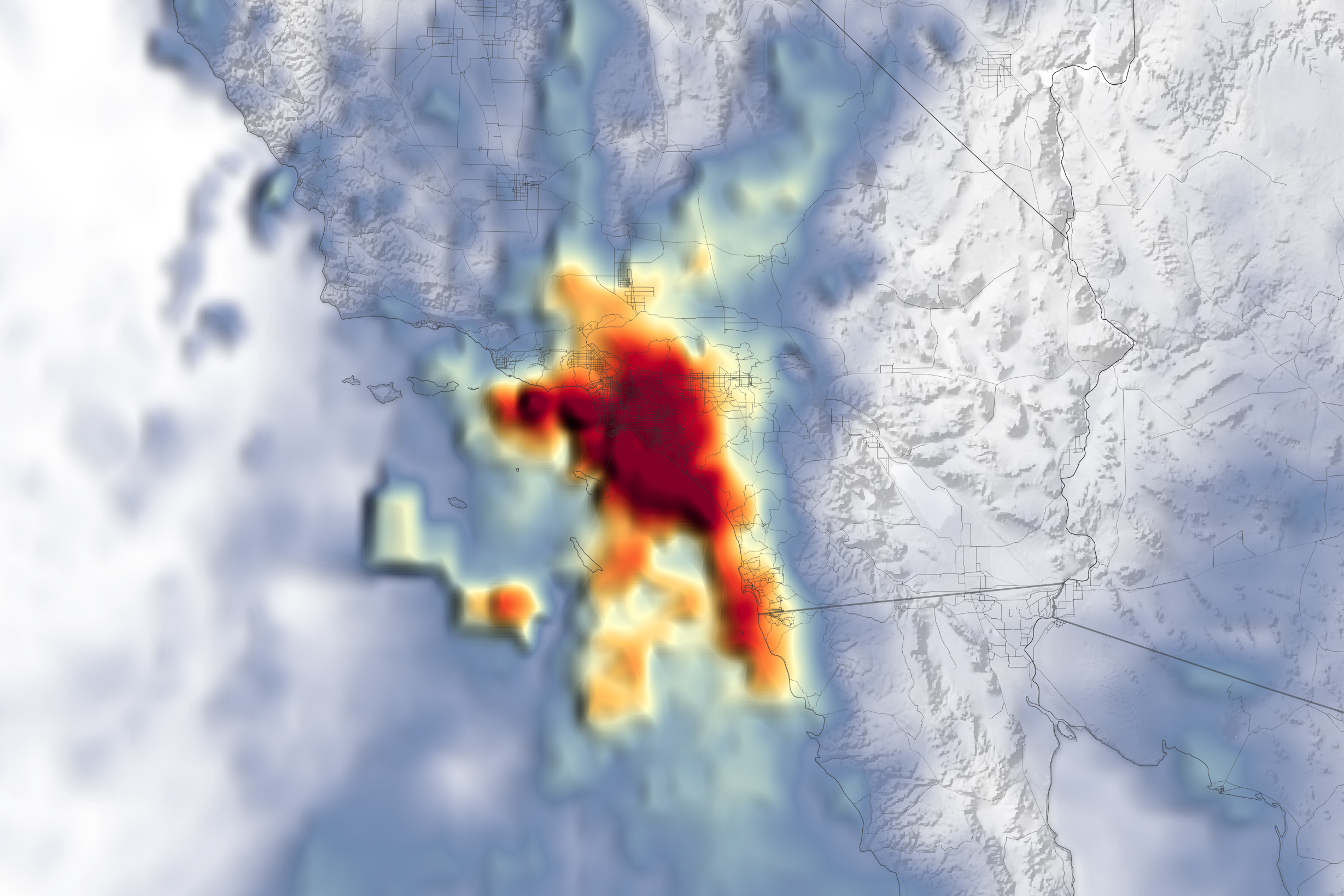
NOAA satellite-based estimate of the storm's average rainfall rates

Downtown Los Angeles had received 8.51 inches (216 mm) of rain from February 4–6 making it the second wettest three-day span. Following 1.66 in (42 mm) of rain in Death Valley in 72 hours, California State Route 190 was closed and the park experienced a setback in the recovery from Hurricane Hilary. Two tornadoes were confirmed to touch down in San Luis Obispo county.

== Impact ==
Significant amounts of snow fell in the Sierra (2–4 feet) which brought the snowpack from 50 to 70% of average to 70-80% of average. Landslides and fallen trees due to the heavy rain and high wind gusts destroyed and damaged many homes and closed roads throughout California. Bel-Air had a peak 24-hour rainfall of 12.42 inches (315 mm) which equates to a 380-year return interval (0.3%).Los Angeles had been incorporating elements of a stormwater harvesting design to retain the rainwater. From February 4 to 7, the city captured 8.6 billion gallons of water, equivalent to the yearly needs of 106,000 homes. Most of Southern California was 150%-300% of average from October 1 to February 7. Most places throughout Northern California were still 50%-110% of average after the storms.

== See also ==
- Floods in California
- Los Angeles County flood of 2005
- 1997 California New Years Floods
