= 2022–2023 California floods =

Regional natural disaster event

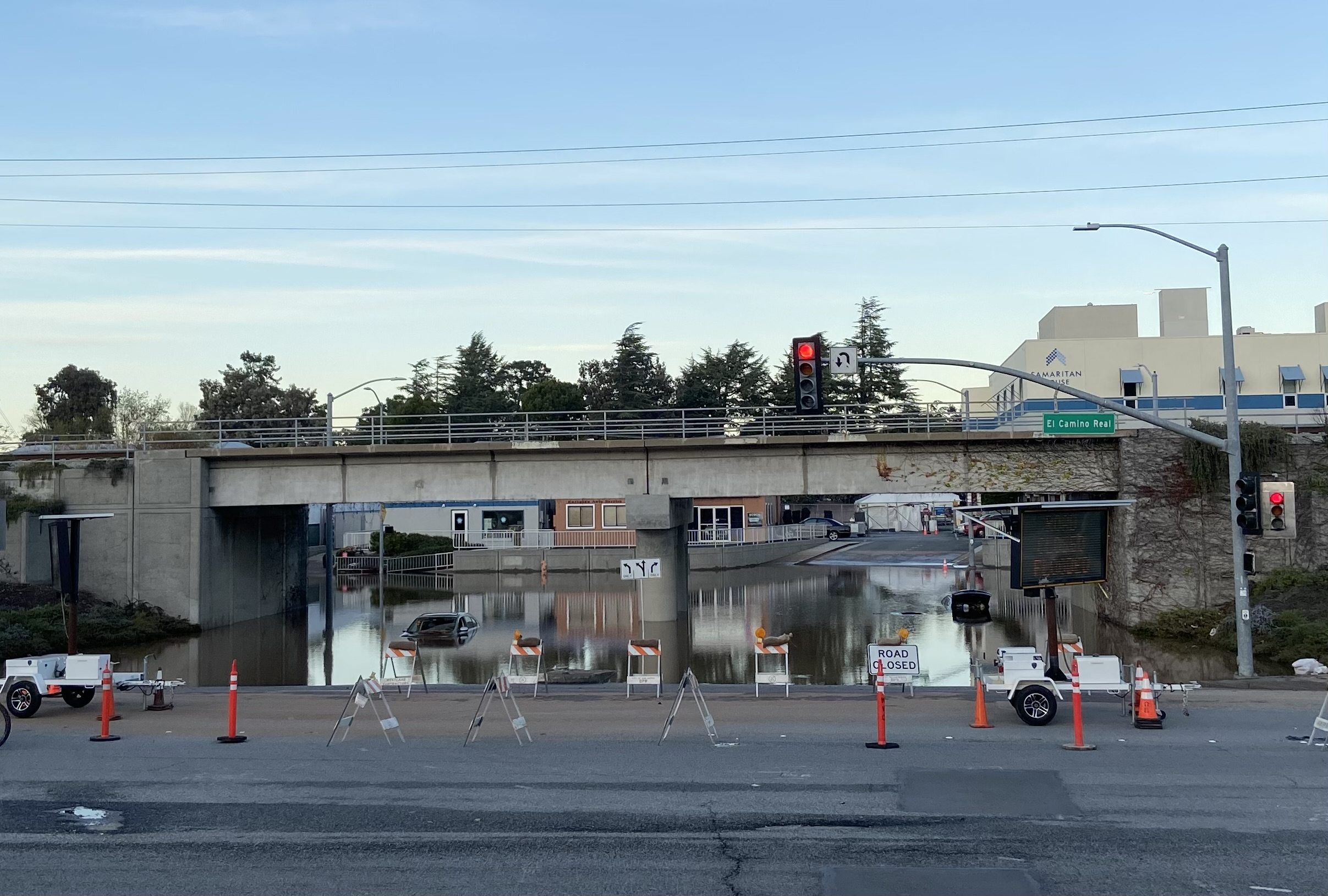
- A flooded underpass in San Mateo
- Date: December 26, 2022 – March 25, 2023
- Location: California; Nevada; Arizona; Utah
- Deaths: 22+
- Property damage: $4.6 billion (2023 USD)

Periods of heavy rainfall caused by multiple atmospheric rivers in California between December 31, 2022, and March 25, 2023, resulted in floods that affected parts of Southern California, the California Central Coast, Northern California and Nevada. The flooding resulted in property damage and at least 22 fatalities. At least 200,000 homes and businesses lost power during the December-January storms and 6,000 individuals were ordered to evacuate.

The floods were widely reported by media as an example of how climate change is increasing extreme changes in weather, especially cycles of precipitation and drought. Scientists interviewed by Los Angeles Times said that further study is needed to determine the connection and California has recorded similar events almost every decade since records started in the 19th century. Other scientists have argued that floods were caused by ocean warming, directly related to climate change. Scientist Kevin Trenberth said that "the interaction between the warming ocean and the overlying atmosphere (...) is producing these prodigious rainfalls that have occurred in so many places around the world recently". Climate change is intensifying the water cycle. This brings more intense rainfall and associated flooding, as well as more intense drought in many regions. It has been both predicted by scientists and observed in the last years and documented by the IPCC (International Panel for Climate Change 6th assessment report). Before the rains started, California had been in an extreme drought.

Due to the storms, Governor Gavin Newsom declared a state of emergency on January 4, 2023. President Joe Biden then declared a state of emergency in 17 California counties on January 9, 2023. That same day, two lawmakers sent a letter urging President Biden to declare a state of emergency for San Luis Obispo County and Santa Barbara County. Biden approved a major disaster declaration for Santa Cruz, Sacramento and Merced counties on January 14. Monterey, San Luis Obispo and Santa Barbara counties were added a few days later to the declaration. Later, Ventura County was approved disaster relief. Biden surveyed the damage with Newsom on January 19.

== Impacts ==
The storms causing the 2022–2023 California floods reached Nevada, Arizona, and Utah.

=== California ===
Over 40 state parks in California were completely closed in January, and one national park was also closed, Redwood National Park. Dozens of Amtrak trains were delayed, ran on modified schedules, or cancelled entirely due to the floods as well.

==== San Francisco Bay Area ====
One of the bomb cyclones related to the floods on January 4

Oakland set a record for 24 hour rainfall at 4.75 in (121 mm) of rain on December 31, while San Francisco recorded its second wettest day with 5.46 in (139 mm) of rain. The Santa Cruz Branch Rail Line sustained major damage. US 101 was flooded in South San Francisco, California, while SR 84 was closed due to landslides and flooding in Fremont. This forced the Oakland Zoo to close until at least January 17. Flooding and road washouts were widely reported. Flooding was exacerbated by the series of storms as they exceeded the soil's capacity to soak up water.

A two-year-old boy in Occidental died from his injuries in January after a tree fell on his family house. A weather station in Nicasio recorded a wind gust of 101 miles per hour (163 km/h) during the bomb cyclone on January 4.

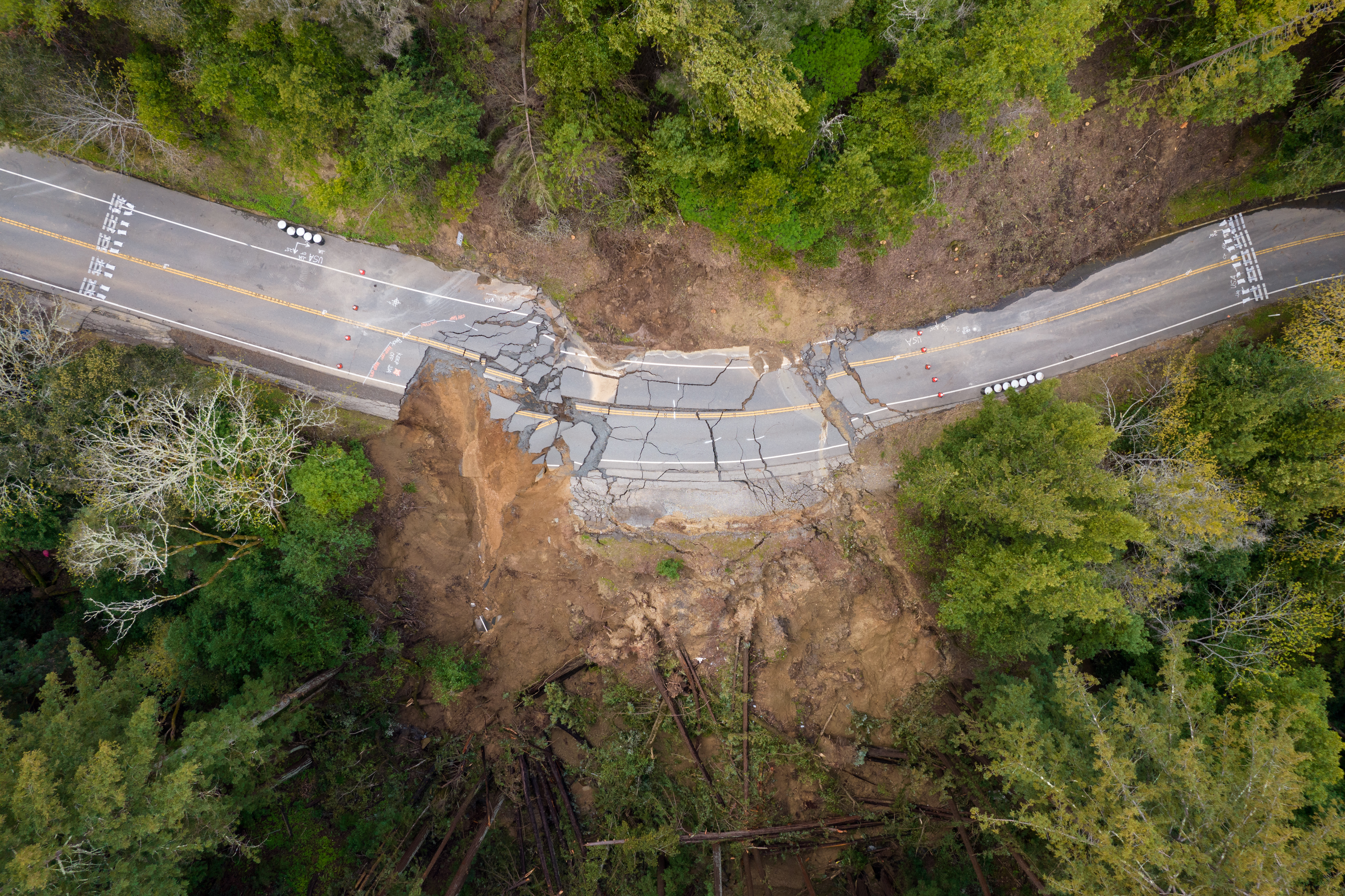
Damage from a landslide on SR 84 in Woodside, CA

On March 11, 2023, In Woodside, SR 84 (La Honda Road) between Portola Road/Woodside Road and SR 35 (Skyline Boulevard) was closed indefinitely due to damage from a landslide, resulting in the road buckling and leaving behind large cracks.

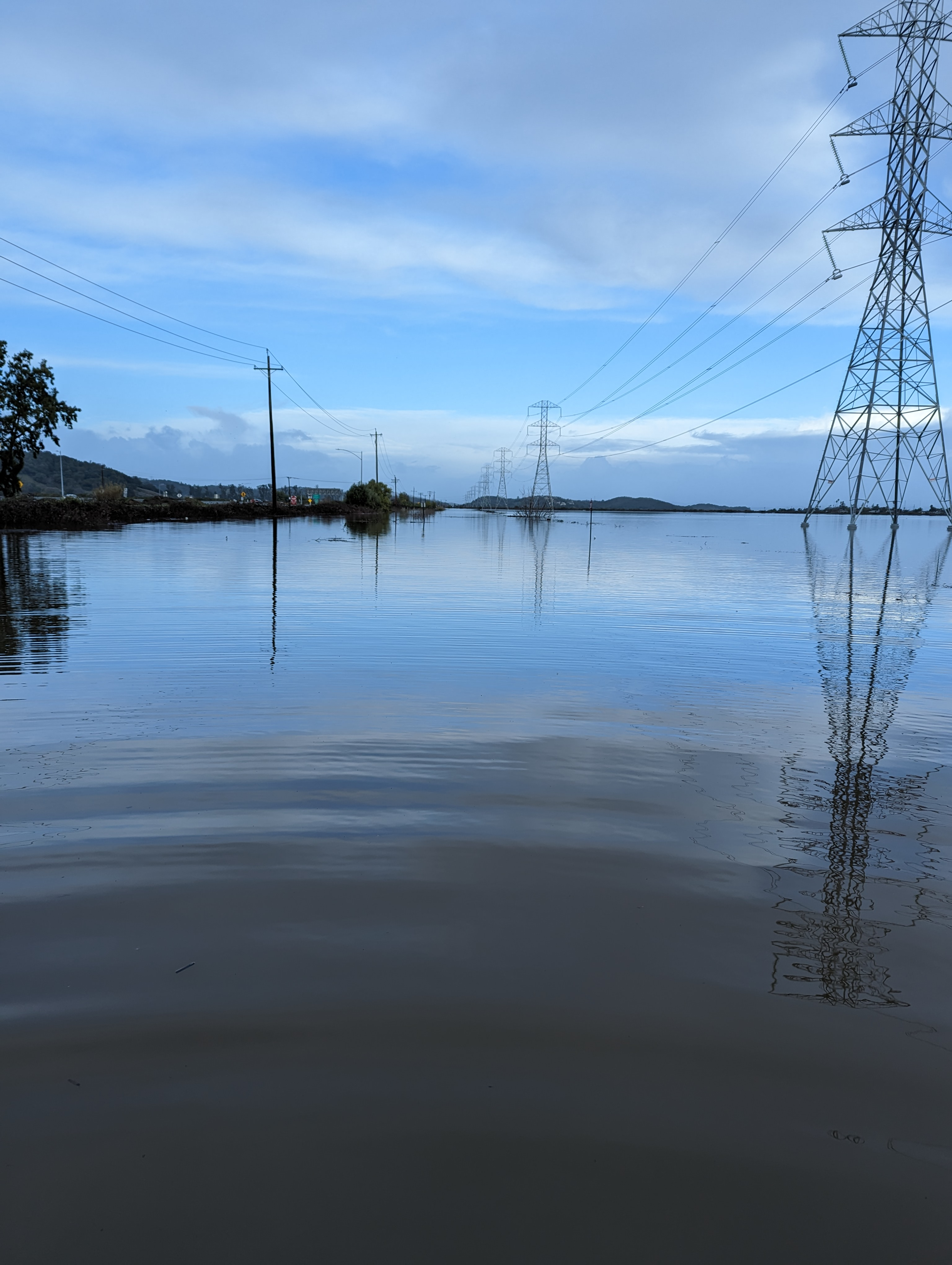
Submerged railroad tracks in Novato

Trocadero was severely damaged as a result of the storm. A shelter-in-place order was issued for the area around 555 California Street after glass panels started being blown off the side of the building.

Flooding shut down US 101 in Gilroy, as well as I-580 in Oakland. It was reported that trees and power lines had been downed by the storm with an Amtrak commuter train hit by a tree and derailed near Porta Costa, though the train remained upright and no one was injured according to officials. On March 21, a ground stop was imposed at San Francisco International Airport.

The North Bay was also severely impacted by flooding. In Novato, a levee along Novato creek broke, leading to severe inundations up to 8–10 feet (2.4–3.0 m) deep. In total, 3.45 square miles (8.9 km^{2}) of fields and pastures in Novato were flooded, and SR 37 was shut down for a period of time. The Brazos subdivision of the Northwestern Pacific Railroad between Schellville and Novato was also temporarily shut down due to the tracks being underwater, and Sonoma-Marin Area Rail Transit had to run a replacement bus service between Novato Downtown and Novato Hamilton.

==== Sacramento Valley ====
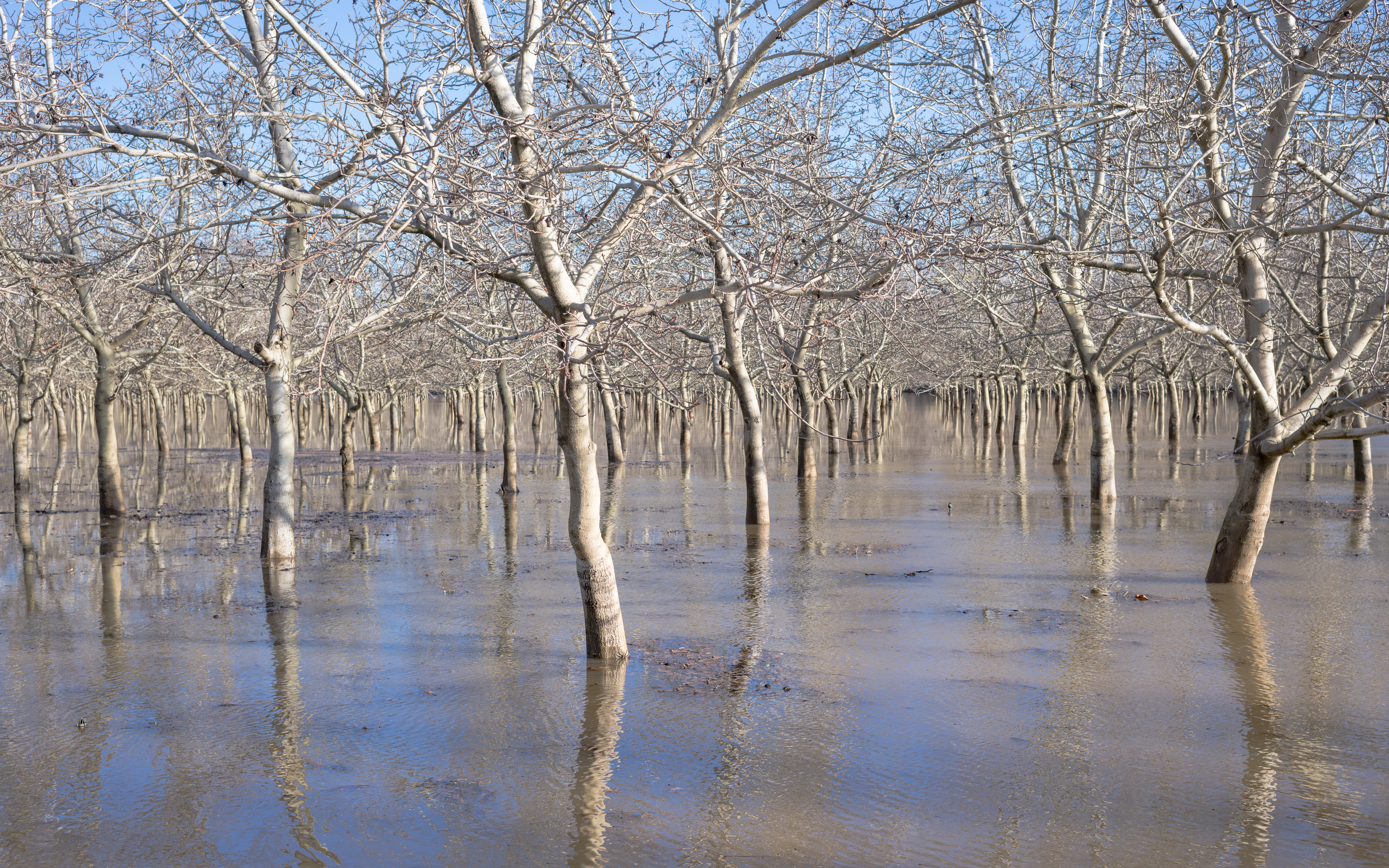
A flooded walnut orchard near the Sacramento River in Butte County on January 8

A levee along the Cosumnes River broke in January, resulting in the SR 99 being flooded. Evacuations were ordered in Wilton. Several people were trapped in their cars and had to be rescued. Three people were killed from flooding on the roads. The levee failures were traced to a private property.

Wind gusts of over 60 miles per hour (97 km/h) knocked down trees and caused widespread power outages that affected over 500,000 SMUD and PG&E customers. On January 10, a brief EF1 tornado caused extensive damage to softwood and hardwood trees northeast of Milton. On January 14, a brief EF0 tornado near Clay damaged the roofs of two garages and uplifted a wall-less RV structure, which caused it to collapse. Two people were killed when trees fell on them due to the high winds. A total of five people died from the December-January storms in Sacramento County, making it the hardest-hit county in the state. The Sacramento Zoo closed on January 10 due to storm damage.

==== Owens Valley ====
Owens Valley also experienced flooding which resulted in Owens Lake being flooded for the first time in over a century.

==== Southern California ====
Evacuations were issued in January for Ventura County and Santa Barbara counties, including Montecito (which had experienced the deadly 2018 mudflows). Multiple highways, including I-5, SR 126, and US 101, were closed, and a sinkhole that swallowed two cars opened up near Chatsworth. The SoFi Stadium, which hosted the 2023 College Football Playoff National Championship, experienced rain. In Los Angeles, Union Station's main concourse flooded. A waterspout moved ashore as an EF0 tornado in Carpinteria on March 21, inflicting minor damage to trees as well as about 25 homes in mobile home park and injuring one person.

A high-end EF1 tornado struck Montebello on March 22, damaging 17 structures, 11 of which sustained significant damage, damaging or flipping vehicles, and snapping trees and power poles. One person was injured. This was the strongest tornado to strike the Greater Los Angeles metro area since March 1983. SR 74 through the San Bernardino National Forest was closed.

Twelve fatalities occurred in San Bernardino County.

Southern California was again later affected by heavy rainfall and flooding in August due to the remnants of Hurricane Hilary.

==== Central California ====
The Central Coast experienced widespread flooding in January. A flash flood outside of Paso Robles swept away a five-year-old boy who was on his way to school. He and his mother had exited their vehicle and rescuers were only able to reach his mother. After a seven-hour search, only one of his shoes was found. The main coastal rail line that connects the San Francisco Bay Area to Los Angeles was closed down when a bridge at Honda Point within Vandenberg Space Force Base had to undergo several weeks of repairs due to the flooding that had eroded the earth that supports the bridge's footings. A section of the bridge over Sespe Creek near Fillmore washed away on January 10, preventing the movement of freight trains on the Santa Paula Branch Line. SR 33 was closed after a washout damaged the roadway. Several portions of the highway were also covered in muddy debris along with other local highways in Ventura County. The Santa Barbara Municipal Airport was closed due to flooding. The Salinas River filled above flood levels, resulting in road closures of bridges in Paso Robles and causing a levee to break near Salinas.

On March 10, the levee on the Pajaro River failed, triggering flooding and forcing nearly 2,000 residents to evacuate. Another breach was discovered March 13, though authorities believed that breach may have helped ease flooding as it gave the river another outlet. Experts said the levees had been weakened by poor material selection, earthquakes and rodent activity. In Soquel, about 450 people were stranded in their homes after a creek washed out the only road leading to their neighborhood on March 10. A water main break also deprived residents of access to clean water.

In the Central Valley, the flooding caused nearly 180 square miles (470 km^{2}) of Tulare Lake to flood for the first time since 1997. In Tulare County, a levee on Deer Creek north of the town of Allensworth breached the night of March 17, forcing residents of Allensworth and nearby Alpaugh to evacuate. Officials said an individual had used machinery to deliberately breach the levee. In Merced, evacuations were ordered throughout the area because of an overflow at the nearby Bear Creek. In Bishop, the city exceeded its annual precipitation average by January 11 due to the floods. In Tuolumne County, a brief low-end EF1 tornado, the first tornado ever recorded in the county, uprooted trees and snapped power poles near Yosemite Junction on March 11.

The flooding is helping to spread a deadly fungal disease called coccidioidomycosis, or Valley fever. The California Department of Public Health said the 9,280 new cases of Valley fever with onset dates in 2023 was the highest number the department has ever documented. The Coccidioides flourishes due to the oscillation between extreme dryness and extreme wetness.

=== Other states ===
==== Nevada ====
Flood watches were issued for Northern Nevada in December. In parts of the Sierra Nevada, 7.5 in (19 cm) of snow fell in just one hour. Reno, Nevada recorded its third wettest day on record. The initial wave of storms in Nevada caused a fatality and $10 million in damage. In addition, 35,000 customers in the state lost power.

==== Arizona ====
Flooding from Oak Creek impacted the community of Cornville in Yavapai County, Arizona, on January 1 due to heavy rain hitting the area. Water from the creek rose to more than 8 ft (2.4 m), prompting flood warnings to be issued for the area. On January 2, Phoenix set a daily rainfall record of .43 in (11 mm), with snow falling north of the suburbs.

==== Utah ====
The city of Draper, Utah, experienced flooding on the night of January 10 when heavy rains moved through the city. More than 30 homes were inundated as several inches of rain fell.

== Precipitation totals ==
Total precipitation of affected areas from December 26, 2022 to January 11, 2023
State	Location	Amount	
California	San Francisco	13.59 inches (34.5 cm)	Total precipitation for California from December 26, 2022 to January 11, 2023
California	Oakland	12.90 inches (32.8 cm)	Total precipitation for California from December 26, 2022 to January 11, 2023
California	Santa Barbara	12.10 inches (30.7 cm)	Total precipitation for California from December 26, 2022 to January 11, 2023
California	San Francisco; International Airport	11.59 inches (29.4 cm)	Total precipitation for California from December 26, 2022 to January 11, 2023
California	Napa	11.21 inches (28.5 cm)	Total precipitation for California from December 26, 2022 to January 11, 2023
California	Redding	10.80 inches (27.4 cm)	Total precipitation for California from December 26, 2022 to January 11, 2023
California	Sacramento	9.58 inches (24.3 cm)	Total precipitation for California from December 26, 2022 to January 11, 2023
California	Stockton	8.10 inches (20.6 cm)	Total precipitation for California from December 26, 2022 to January 11, 2023
Nevada	Reno	5.03 inches (12.8 cm)	Total precipitation for California from December 26, 2022 to January 11, 2023

Total snowfall of affected areas from December 26, 2022 to January 11, 2023
State	Town	Amount	
California	Mammoth Mountain	190 inches (480 cm)	Total snowfall for California from December 26, 2022 to January 11, 2023
California	Donner Pass	122.6 inches (311 cm)	Total snowfall for California from December 26, 2022 to January 11, 2023
California	Mono City	76.7 inches (195 cm)	Total snowfall for California from December 26, 2022 to January 11, 2023
California	Tahoma	65.6 inches (167 cm)	Total snowfall for California from December 26, 2022 to January 11, 2023
Nevada	Daggett Pass	48 inches (120 cm)	Total snowfall for California from December 26, 2022 to January 11, 2023
California	Tahoe City	47 inches (120 cm)	Total snowfall for California from December 26, 2022 to January 11, 2023
Nevada	Reno	11.6 inches (29 cm)	Total snowfall for California from December 26, 2022 to January 11, 2023

== See also ==
- ARkStorm
- January 1982 California floods
- 1997 Merced River flood
- 2017 California floods
- December 2022 North American winter storm
- 2022–23 North American winter
- July–August 2022 United States floods
- Weather of 2023
