= Los Angeles County flood of 2005 =

First large flood in southern California since 1938

- Date: January 2005
- Location: Los Angeles, Glendale, Malibu, Topanga Canyon
- Deaths: 17
- Property damage: $300 million

The Los Angeles County flood of 2005 was the first large flood in Los Angeles County since 1938. It affected communities near the Los Angeles River and areas ranging from Santa Barbara County in the north to Orange and San Diego Counties in the south, as well as Riverside and San Bernardino Counties to the east. Large amounts of rain in January caused the Los Angeles River basin to overflow. The Ventura, Santa Ynez, and Santa Clara Rivers also flooded.

== Extent and effects ==
Over 37 in (940 mm) of rain was recorded in downtown Los Angeles for the 2004-2005 rain season, marking the highest rainfall year since 1884. Ski areas in the San Gabriel and San Bernardino Mountains also received record amounts of snow. From December 27, 2004, through January 10, 2005, 16.97 in (431 mm) of rain fell on downtown Los Angeles, the wettest 15-day consecutive period on record.

Seventeen deaths were attributed to rainfall, and several hundred people were displaced by flooding. The worst incident was a mudslide at La Conchita in Ventura County which destroyed 15 homes and killed 10 people.

U.S. President George W. Bush declared a state of emergency in Southern California to assist in recovery from flood damages estimated at $300 million or more.

== In popular culture ==
The events and survivor accounts of the flood is featured on the first episode of the television series Full Force Nature on The Weather Channel titled "California Flooded River" and the seventh episode of the 2006 revival of World's Most Amazing Videos on Spike TV.

== See also ==
- Pineapple Express
- Floods in California
- Los Angeles Flood of 1938
- February 2024 California atmospheric rivers - Flooding that also took place 19 years later in Southern California
