= La Conchita landslides =

Major landslides in La Conchita, California

Coordinates: 34°21′50.5″N 119°26′45″W

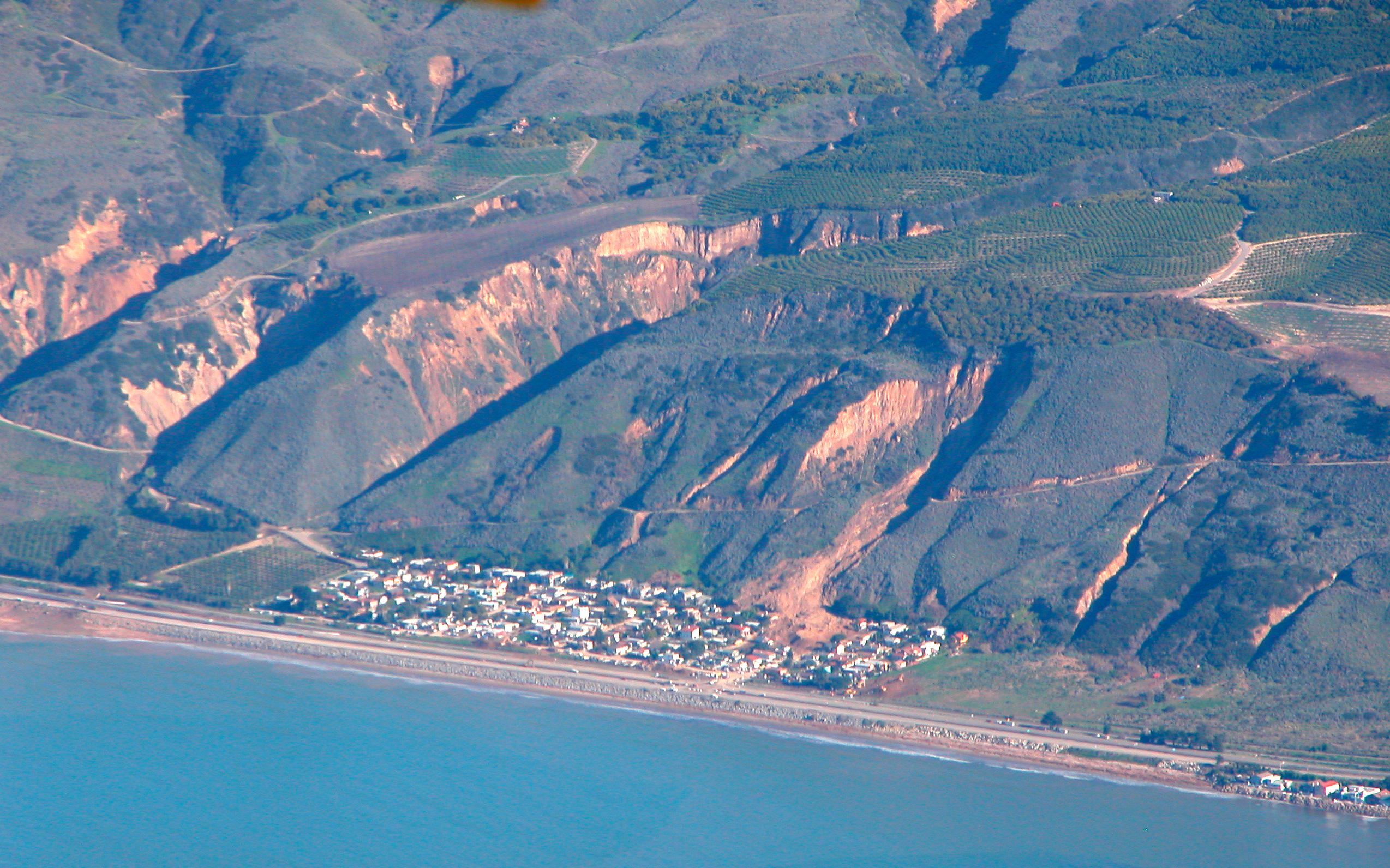
La Conchita landslide, photo taken 14 January 2005

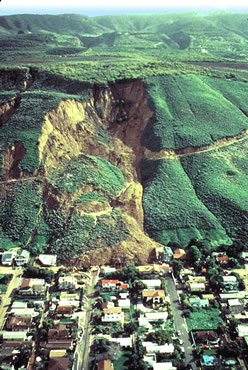
La Conchita landslide, 1995

The town of La Conchita, California, experienced major landslides in 1995 and 2005. The latter landslide killed 10 people, and destroyed or damaged dozens of houses. The 2005 landslide occurred on part of a previous landslide that occurred in 1995. The historic slides are part of the larger Rincon Mountain slide, which "started many thousands of years ago and will continue generating slides in the future."

== Setting ==
La Conchita is a small community located on the southern California coastline between Ventura and Santa Barbara. It lies on a narrow strip of land about 250 meters (820 feet) wide between the shoreline and abutting a 180-meter (590 ft) high bluff. The top of the bluff was covered by avocado and citrus orchards. The bluff above La Conchita has a slope of approximately 35 degrees and consists of poorly cemented marine sediments.

Geologic evidence indicates that landslides have been occurring at and near La Conchita for many thousands of years up to the present, on a geologically frequent basis. Historical accounts support this. Reported landslides began in 1865. In both 1889 and 1909, the Southern Pacific rail line running along the coast was inundated. In the 1909 slide, a train was buried. Since that time, other slides have occurred, covering at times cultivated land, roadways, and the community itself.

== 1995 La Conchita landslides ==
In 1994–1995, the seasonal rainfall at Ojai (20 kilometers (12 miles) northeast of La Conchita) from October 1 through March 3 (the day before the landslide occurred) was 761 millimeters (29.96 inches), approximately twice the normal amount.

Surface cracks in the upper part of the slope were noted as far back as the summer of 1994. At the beginning of the rainy season, in December 1994, several open cracks had opened on the hillside, and surface runoff was infiltrating into the subsurface.

On March 4, 1995, the hill behind La Conchita failed, moving tens of meters in minutes, and buried nine homes with no loss of life. The County of Ventura immediately declared the whole community a Geological Hazard Area, imposing building restrictions on the community to restrict new construction.

Days later, on March 10, a subsequent debris flow from a canyon to the northwest damaged five additional houses in the northwestern part of La Conchita. The dimensions of the slides were approximately 120 meters (390 feet) wide, 330 meters (1,080 ft) long, and 30 meters (98 ft) deep. The deposit covered approximately 4 hectares (9.9 acres), and the volume was estimated to be approximately 1.3 million cubic meters (1.7 million cubic yards) of sediment. The landslide slumped as a coherent mass of material.

Based on the opinion that surface water infiltration from irrigation contributed to the landslide, seventy-one homeowners sued La Conchita Ranch Co. in Bateman v. La Conchita Ranch Co. The judge ruled that irrigation was not the major cause of the slide and that the ranch owners were not responsible.

== 2005 La Conchita landslide ==
In 2005, an additional landslide occurred at the end of a 15–day period of near-record rainfall levels. From December 27, 2004, through January 10, 2005, the nearby city of Ventura received 378 millimeters (14.9 inches) of rainfall, only slightly less than its mean annual total of 390 millimeters (15.4 inches).

The 2005 landslide involved few new materials and seems to have been a continuation of the original 1995 landslide. The landslide occurred after a 15-day period of unprecedented records of rainfall in Southern California. It is likely that the new rainfall did not enter the deposits left behind after the 1995 landslide, but slid off it taking surface debris and few new materials with it.

On January 10, 2005, the southeastern portion of the 1995 landslide deposit failed, resulting in shallow, rapid fluid flow, unlike the 1995 landslide. The volume of the landslide was estimated to be approximately 200,000 cubic meters with a surface 350 meters (1,150 feet) long and 80–100 meters (260–330 ft) wide. The landslide destroyed 13 houses and severely damaged 23 others. There were 10 confirmed fatalities.

Subsequently, residents formed the La Conchita Community Organization (LCCO) to coordinate with government officials to determine the best way to protect the community. In March 2006, Governor of California, Arnold Schwarzenegger, allocated $667,000 for a scientific study to determine control measures to be taken to prevent future landslides.

In 2008, family members of those killed and or who suffered loss of property in the 2005 La Conchita Landslide filed a lawsuit against the La Conchita Ranch Co., located at the top of slope. The Ranch was found 50% negligent because it did not provide for adequate drainage of its orchards during torrential rains and settled the suit. Three years after the 2005 landslide, the owners of an avocado ranch agreed to turn over all 700 acres (280 ha) of their land and other assets to settle the suit. The plaintiffs also sued the County of Ventura for damages, claiming that a wall that the County built at the base of the landslide caused or contributed to the landslide. Ultimately, the County prevailed against the plaintiffs on all claims.

== Continuing risks ==
There is no reason to believe that landslides will not continue to threaten or impact La Conchita. Future landslide activity could occur in the areas of the 1995 and 2005 landslides or in other areas and could damage or destroy any or all of the developed area. The USGS report stated that "no part of the community can be considered safe from landslides."

Ventura County notes that risk is continuous and that it cannot issue predictions. It lists current rainfall, along with historical events for comparison. They say the 1995 slide happened two months after a month when 15 inches fell, and the 2005 slide happened at the end of two weeks with 8 inches of rain. A small 2010 slide happened after rain fell at one inch per hour.

== In popular culture ==
- The 2005 La Conchita landslide is the setting of T.C. Boyle's short story La Conchita.

== See also ==
- California landslides
