= Truttman Sink =

Earthflow in the Humboldt Lagoons State Park, California

Geography of Truttman Sink
- Continent: North America
- Region: California
- Coordinates: 41°12′58″N 124°06′42″W

The Truttman Sink is an earthflow within the Humboldt Lagoons State Park, along the coast of Humboldt County, California. It is located between Trinidad to the south and Orick to the north. It deposits materials into the northern end of Big Lagoon and the Pacific Ocean, especially during periods of heavy rain. The soil characteristics, geology, and vegetation along the slope of this mass-wasting feature suggest a combination of an earthflow movement and a rotational slump.

== History ==
The Truttman Sink has a documented history of higher recession rates from wave activity in comparison to headlands to the north and south. This area was given its name by Cal Trans because the Truttman family owned the land surrounding the coastal headlands. The original highway alignment between Kane Road and the north end of Big Lagoon and McDonald Creek was built on extremely unconsolidated and unstable uplifted marine sediments. After years of paving over the eroding highway for maintenance, Cal Trans ultimately brought Highway 101 to its current inland alignment and decommissioned the old highway in 1971.

Settlers and gold miners made their way to this area in the 1800s, which made major impacts on the area. They brought with them livestock that would occasionally overgraze the natural meadows, which led to the burning of thick vegetation off the more gentle, rolling terrain to increase pastureland. According to Richard Truttman, the headland was burned every other year in January and the original Sitka Spruce forest was logged or burned. This left the headland barren of vegetation for many years and immensely affected the slope stability of the area.

The old highway remained stable for a few years after construction, but then began to slip. Eventually, the old highway surface was known to have dropped one meter overnight. This drop is the headscarp of the mass wasting event.

== Geology ==
Truttman Sink is associated with the Franciscan Formation (or Complex/Assemblage), which is made up of rock types such as: sedimentary sandstone and shale, oceanic basalt, greenstone, chert, serpentinite, limestone, and several metamorphic rock types (blueschist, amphibolite, and eclogite). Franciscan rock is considered a part of a Mesozoic subduction complex and ranges all along the Californian coast.

The Truttman Sink Franciscan Formation is considered a mélange, which is a fine-grained mixture of broken down Franciscan rock types. Fine-grained materials make areas with mélange susceptible to erosion once saturated with water, which is important for the Truttman Sink due to the contact with the ocean and high amounts of precipitation. Mélange zones generally have a clay-rich matrix and are broken down easily from the forces of mass wasting and weathering. The clay component of the matrix is what causes most of the slope failures due to the absorption of large amounts of water combined with increased weight. These slope failures cause large rock conglomerates and trees to move down from higher up the slope, become deposited on the beach, and washed into the ocean or lagoon.

Weathered mélange forms a sticky clay soil known as "blue goo" or "grey goo" due to its coloration. This is evident mostly in the toe of the Truttman Sink hill slope due to less dense vegetation, but can also be found on the midslope.

== Vegetation ==
The Truttman Sink area contains a wide variety of ferns such as sword fern (Polystichum munitum), common polypody (Polypodium vulgare), coast polypody (Polypodium scouleri), lady fern (Athyrium filix-femina), and there are a variety of invasive plants like blackberry and annual grasses. The area also consists of Sitka spruce (Picea sitchensis), twinberry honeysuckle (Lonicera involucrata), red alder (Alnus rubra), and skunk cabbage (Lysichiton americanus). There are many more plant species in this coastal headland, but the most important in terms of evidence of mass wasting are the Sitka spruce and skunk cabbage.

The top of the slope consists of a mix of tanoak, Sitka spruce, and other herbaceous and woody plant species. A change in vegetation is seen in the mid slope or body with the introduction of skunk cabbage, which is a species that requires constantly wet areas. This wetness is the beginning of evidence seen throughout the slope that points to earthflow and rotational slide characteristics. Following this saturated area, Sitka spruce trees start to become back rotated as the rock and soil materials below are moving towards the ocean. At the toe of the slope the trees are the most back rotated. This area has more wave action when the ocean passes the spit and hanging root systems are exposed in areas of melange matrices.
