= Palos Verdes Peninsula landslides =

History of landslides in a coastal part of California, US

A small section of the Palos Verdes Peninsula, a coastal region of the Los Angeles metropolitan area, has a long history of land movements stretching back 250,000 years. The Palos Verdes Peninsula is home to the cities of Rancho Palos Verdes, Rolling Hills, and Rolling Hills Estates, as well as Palos Verdes Estates.

== History ==
A small section of the peninsula, the Portuguese Bend area of the Palos Verdes Peninsula has a history of landslides going back 250,000 years. The landslide spans 260 acres (1.1 km^{2}) with an average thickness of 135 feet (41 m). The ground failure occurs on an overall smooth surface approximately 100 feet (30 m) below the surface. The ground failure over the years has been due to seaward-dipping strata, rock weakness and continual coastal erosion.

== Rancho Palos Verdes ==
The landslide area inside the city of Rancho Palos Verdes spans 260 acres (1.1 km^{2}) with an average thickness of 135 feet (41 m). The ground failure occurs on an overall smooth surface approximately 100 feet (30 m) below the surface. The ground failure over the years has been due to seaward-dipping strata, rock weakness and continual coastal erosion.

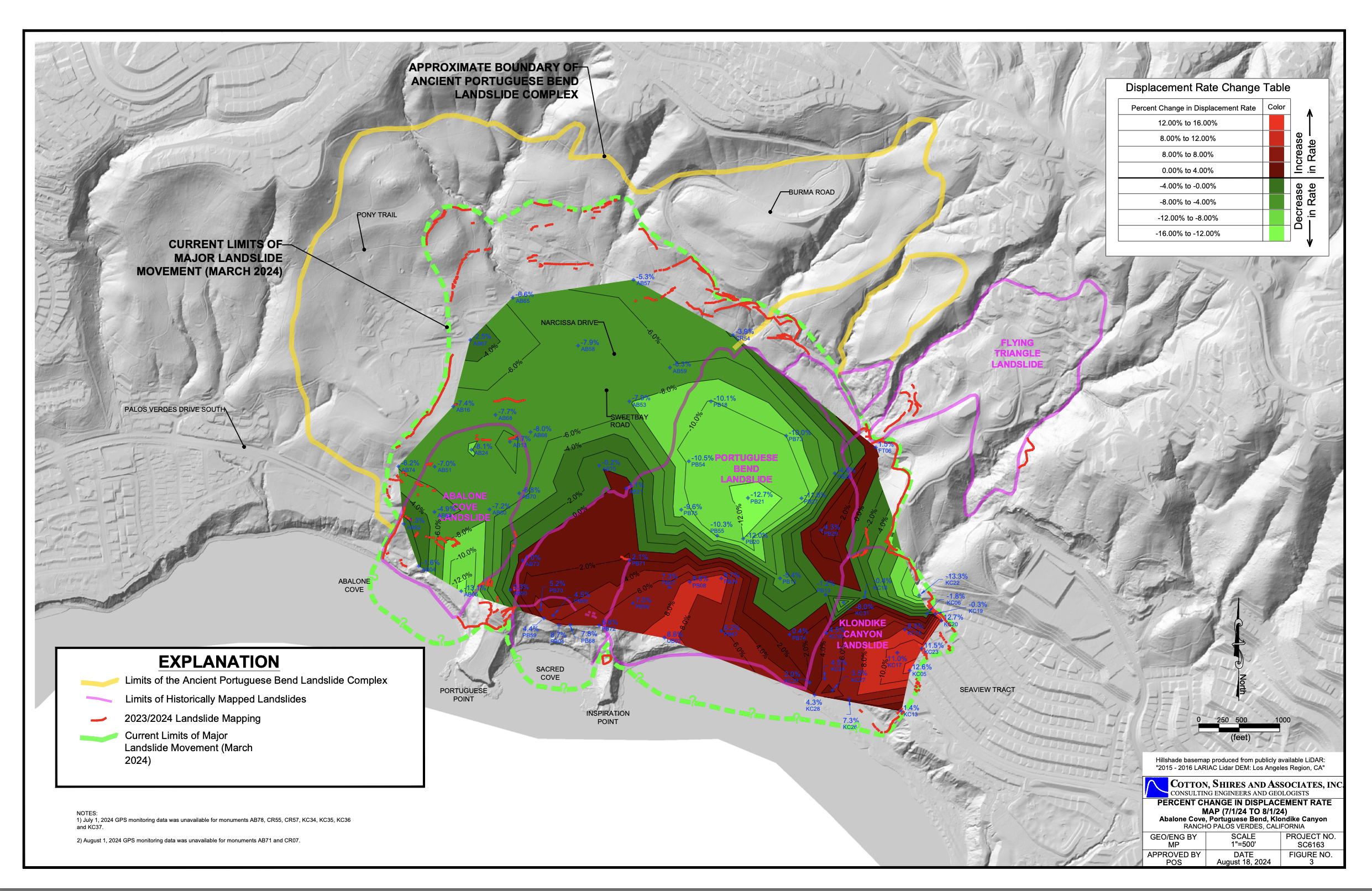
Landslide Complex Area: Portuguese Bend, Abalone Cove, Beach Club, Klondike Canyon and Seaview

=== 1956 Portuguese Bend Landslide ===
The Portuguese Bend landslide was activated in 1956, before Rancho Palos Verdes was incorporated as a city. Beginning in September 1956 and continuing until early 1957, the area experienced a landslide caused by the construction of a road (the Crenshaw Boulevard extension, south of Crest Road) along the top of an ancient landslide complex. The impacted areas ranged from several acres to roughly two square miles A 1958 video newsreel showed the effects of the landslide’s impact: 140 of the 170 homes in the area were destroyed or displaced.

In 1961, area homeowners filed a lawsuit against Los Angeles County and won a settlement of roughly $10 million.

=== Abalone Cove Slide ===
From 1974 to 1978, an 80 acre landslide occurred in the Abalone Cove area. The lower part of the landslide started to move in February 1974. The "Abalone Cove Slide" was moving so slowly that geologists did not verify that it was an actual slide until 1976, after it had damaged roughly twenty homes. It is estimated that the landslides damaged nearly 50 homes and depressed property values.

In 1978, residents noticed cracks on Palos Verdes Drive South, and the upper part of the slide may have started to shift. That same year, the city restricted building new homes in the areas impacted by the landslides, "Landslide Moratorium Map." Since 1980, efforts to control landslide movement have involved removing ground water from the landslide mass.

=== Beach Club Landslide ===
The Portuguese Beach Club landslide is a minor slide within the area's landslide complex. In 2024, residents of Seaview and the Beach Club filed a lawsuit against the City of Rancho Palos Verdes. In 2024, the Beach Club area experienced major deformation along Seawall Road, approximately four to five feet across the beach, and potentially into an offshore slide area.

=== Klondike Canyon Landslide ===
The Klondike Canyon has been noted for landslides. Renewed movement occurred in 1979, and a Geologic Hazard Abatement Districts was created to study the Klondike Canyon landslides in 1982.. However, there has been no measurable land movement since 1982.

=== Portuguese Bend and Seaview Landslide ===
In 2023, the city received a more than $23 million grant from the Federal Emergency Management Agency (FEMA) to help mitigate the effects of the land movement in the area. Later in the year, the Rancho Palos Verdes City Council declared a local emergency due to increasing land movement following landslides.

In July 2024, So Cal Gas suspended services to 135 homes due to the severity of the land movement. On September 2, 2024, California Governor Gavin Newsom declared a state of emergency, and officials cut power to 245 homes. As of February 2025, land movement has slowed significantly, resulting in gas and electricity services being restored to a number of homes in the land movement area. The city also installed dozens of dewatering wells and drainage improvements as a long‑term stabilization project in the area.

As of May 2025, SoCalGas has begun to restore gas services to the majority of homes in the landslide area following reports that monitoring has shown no measurable movement in the land because of the city's mitigation efforts.

=== Portuguese Mud/Landslide Community Infrastructure Resilience Project ===
In 2023, FEMA awarded a $23.3 million grant to Rancho Palos Verdes for the Portuguese Mud/Landslide Community Infrastructure Resilience Project . The goal of the grant is to make improvements in the existing groundwater extraction systems and to install new subsurface water extraction systems.

=== Rancho Palos Verdes Landslide Complex Working Group ===
The RPV Landslide Complex Working Group meets virtually weekly to plan, coordinate, and implement actions for minimizing land movement and reducing community and property damages. The members of this group include representatives of Abalone Cove Landslide Abatement Districts; California Water Service; City of Rolling Hills; Klondike Canyon Landslide Abatement Districts; Los Angeles County Department of Public Works Sanitary Sewer Maintenance; Los Angeles County Sanitation Districts; Palos Verdes Peninsula Land Conservancy; Portuguese Bend Beach Club Homeowners Association; Portuguese Bend Community Association; Rolling Hills Community Association; Seaview Residential Association; Southern California Gas Company; Southern California Edison; and area residents.

== Rolling Hills ==
=== Flying Triangle Landslide ===
In 1979, residents in the Flying Triangle Landslide area noticed cracks in the main road leading to their neighborhood. The landslide area spanned approximately 90 acres and damaged and destroyed several homes. Impacted homeowners received roughly $16 million in compensatory settlements.

In 1987, there was a documented landslide in the Flying Triangle area above Portuguese Bend.

=== Rolling Hills Landslide Mitigation Project ===
In 2024, Congressman Ted Lieu secured one million dollars for the Rolling Hills Landslide Mitigation Project, which is expected to improve wastewater flow and reduce the risk of additional landslides in the Flying Triangle landslide area within the city boundaries.

== Rolling Hills Estates ==
Rollings Hills Estates is located on the northern side of the Palos Verdes Peninsula, neighboring the cities of Torrance and Rolling Hills.

=== Office Park Land Movement ===
In 1997, employees in a Rolling Hills Estates office park witnessed crumbling walls and buckling sidewalks and had to be evacuated..

=== Peartree Lane Landslide ===
On July 8, 2023, the Peartree Lane Landslide destroyed several homes in Rolling Hills Estates. Townhouses in the area slumped into a canyon. This land movement may have started in 2022 due to an underground leaking water pipe.
