= Weather whiplash =

Rapid swings between extremes in weather

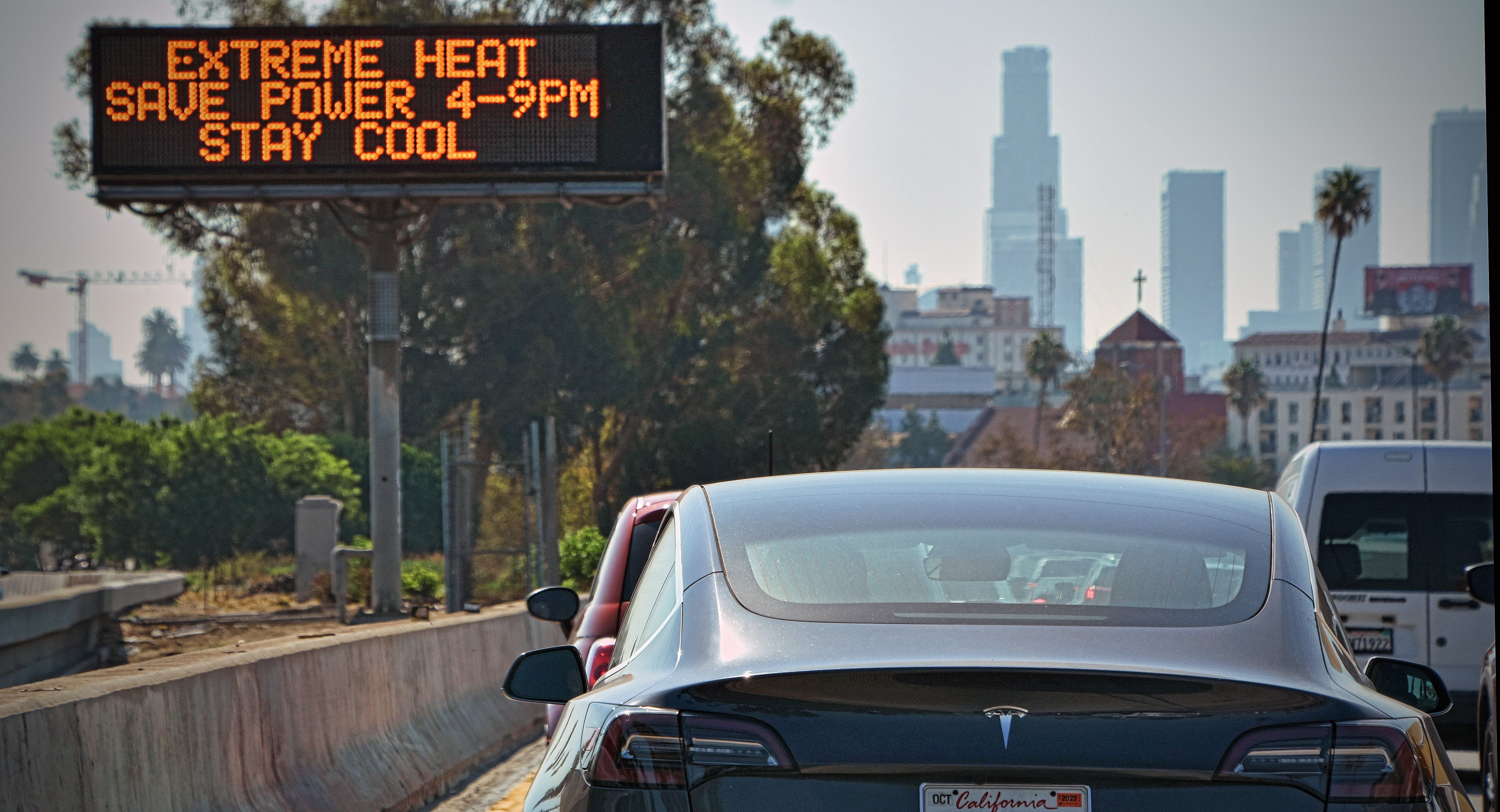
The 2020–2023 North American drought in Los Angeles, September 2022

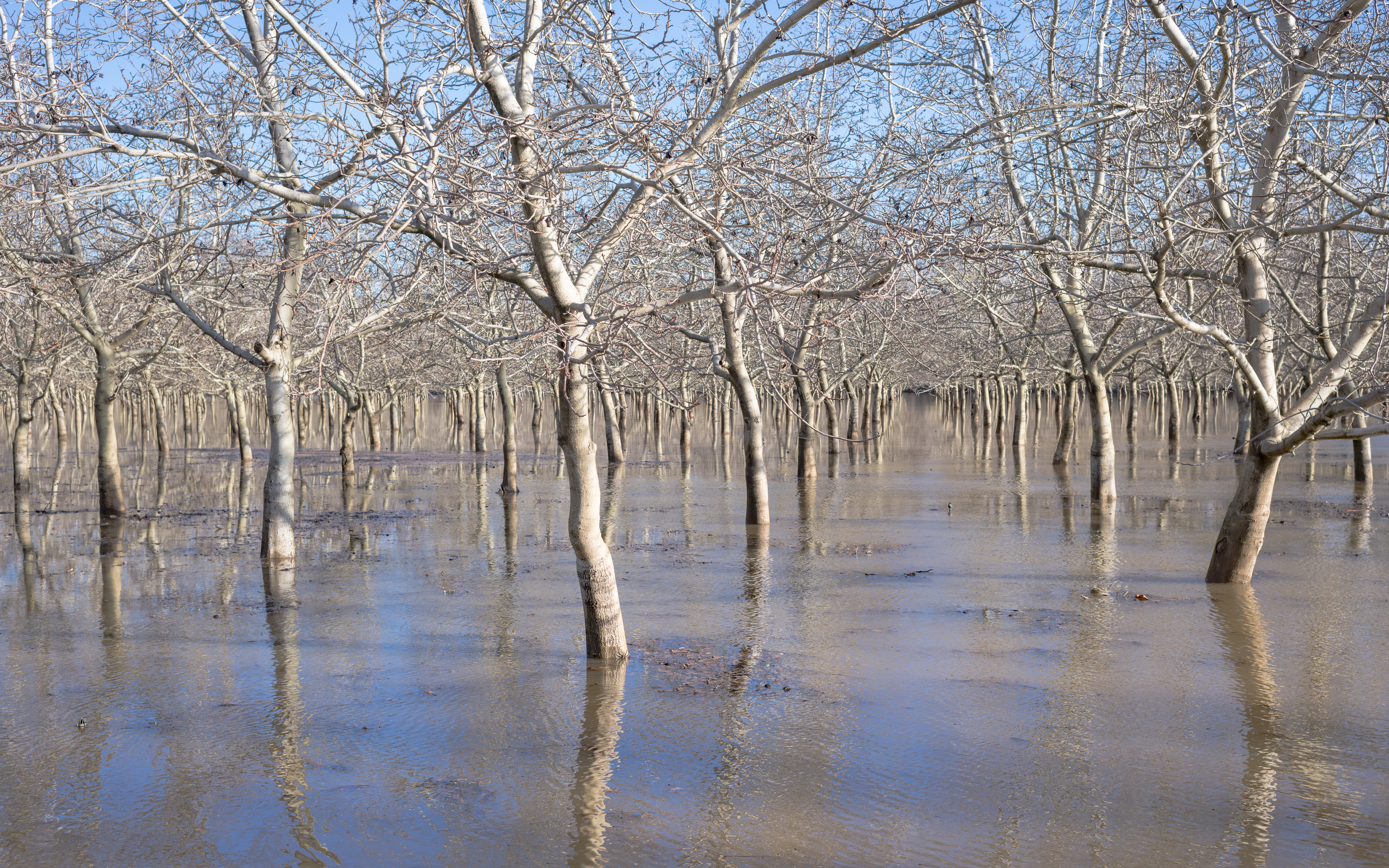
The 2022–2023 California floods in Chico, California, January 2023

Weather whiplash is the phenomenon of rapid swings between extremes in weather.

== Occurrence ==
“Weather whiplash” was coined by climate-science-communicator Paul Beckwith in 2017 in his oft-stated phrase "weather wilding, weirding and whiplashing", but in 2023, Vox's Benji Jones wrote that the phrase had been in use for ten years or more. In a 2021 study in the International Journal of Climatology, Cameron C. Lee characterized it as then gaining prominence in both academia and the press. As of 2019, there was no formal scientific definition for weather whiplash.

Weather whiplash was observed amid the 2022 European heat waves, which parched France in one of its worst ever recorded droughts and caused the driest July for decades in England, then broke with heavy rain and flooding, and rains the same summer during the Southwestern North American megadrought. In late 2022 and early 2023, the phenomenon again struck North America as record cold around Christmas receded into record heat in January, which in early February became even more extreme cold across the Northeastern United States. In the US state of California weather events swung from an extreme drought to flooding caused by atmospheric rivers.

Weather whiplash can also bring false springs, or winter warm spells that conceal a freeze following them, and freak snowstorms early in the season; both can disrupt agriculture and the electrical grid.

A study in 2018 found a likelihood both extremes of precipitation would increase in California, increasing the chances of very wet years following very dry years and vice versa.

== Proposed links to climate change ==
The polar vortex drives fluctuations in winter temperatures in the middle latitudes. Climatologist Judah Cohen and others proposed climate change in the Arctic was causing the vortex to waver, bringing cold air south to the Midwestern United States, which was then replaced by warm tropical air. They said this would increase the frequency of such whiplash in the future. Cohen acknowledged this remained a minority viewpoint as of 2023.
