= Linda, California =

Linda
- census-designated place
- Interactive map of Linda
- Location in the United States
- Coordinates: 39°07′40″N 121°33′03″W
- Country: United States
- State: California
- County: Yuba

Area
  - Total: 8.586 sq mi (22.237 km^{2})
  - Land: 8.586 sq mi (22.237 km^{2})
  - Water: 0 sq mi (0 km^{2}) 0%
- Elevation: 69 ft (21 m)

Population (2020)
  - Total: 21,654
  - Density: 2,522.1/sq mi (973.78/km^{2})
- Time zone: UTC-8 (Pacific (PST))
  - Summer (DST): UTC-7 (PDT)
- ZIP code: 95901
- Area code: 530
- FIPS code: 06-41572
- GNIS feature ID: 1658963

Linda (Spanish for "Pretty") is a census-designated place (CDP) in Yuba County, California, United States. The population was 21,654 at the 2020 census, up from 17,773 at the 2010 census. Linda is located 2 miles (3.2 km) north-northwest of Olivehurstand 3.5 miles south of Marysville.

== Geography ==
Linda is located at 39°07′40″N 121°33′03″W.

According to the United States Census Bureau, the CDP has a total area of 8.6 square miles (22 km^{2}), all land.

=== Climate ===
According to the Köppen Climate Classification system, Linda has a warm-summer Mediterranean climate, abbreviated "Csa" on climate maps.

Climate data for Linda, 1991–2020 simulated normals (66 ft elevation)
Month	Jan	Feb	Mar	Apr	May	Jun	Jul	Aug	Sep	Oct	Nov	Dec	Year
Mean daily maximum °F (°C)	55.6 (13.1)	61.0 (16.1)	66.0 (18.9)	72.1 (22.3)	80.6 (27.0)	89.2 (31.8)	94.8 (34.9)	93.6 (34.2)	89.1 (31.7)	79.0 (26.1)	64.8 (18.2)	55.6 (13.1)	75.1 (24.0)
Daily mean °F (°C)	47.1 (8.4)	51.1 (10.6)	54.9 (12.7)	59.2 (15.1)	66.6 (19.2)	73.6 (23.1)	78.1 (25.6)	76.6 (24.8)	72.7 (22.6)	64.2 (17.9)	53.4 (11.9)	46.8 (8.2)	62.0 (16.7)
Mean daily minimum °F (°C)	38.7 (3.7)	41.0 (5.0)	43.9 (6.6)	46.4 (8.0)	52.5 (11.4)	57.9 (14.4)	61.3 (16.3)	59.9 (15.5)	56.1 (13.4)	49.5 (9.7)	42.1 (5.6)	38.1 (3.4)	48.9 (9.4)
Average precipitation inches (mm)	4.08 (103.55)	3.76 (95.47)	3.30 (83.86)	1.67 (42.47)	0.99 (25.11)	0.31 (7.81)	0.00 (0.00)	0.03 (0.83)	0.12 (3.12)	1.09 (27.77)	2.18 (55.27)	3.90 (98.96)	21.43 (544.22)
Average dew point °F (°C)	40.6 (4.8)	42.3 (5.7)	44.1 (6.7)	44.6 (7.0)	48.2 (9.0)	51.6 (10.9)	54.3 (12.4)	53.6 (12.0)	50.5 (10.3)	45.1 (7.3)	42.6 (5.9)	39.7 (4.3)	46.4 (8.0)
Source: PRISM Climate Group

== History ==
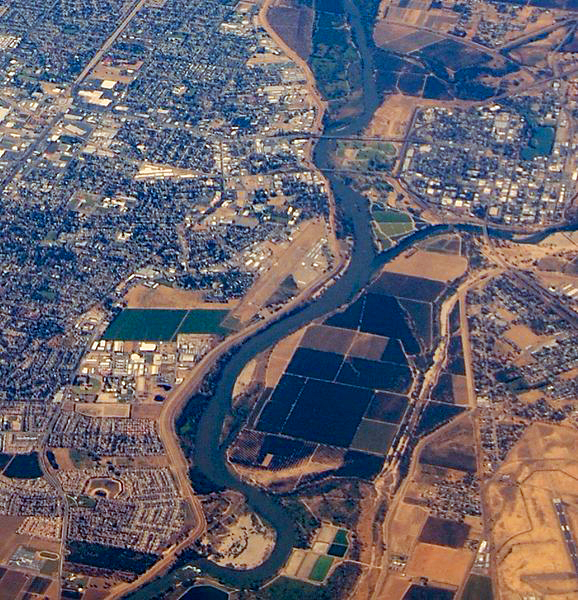
Linda in the Southeast corner

The townsite was originally laid out in 1850 and originally called Olivehurst by John Rose at the furthest navigable point on the Yuba River, on the south bank above Marysville. The town at that site lasted only two years before moving to its present location. The original site is buried under tailings from hydraulic mining.

Speckert Lumber and Diamond International operated a sawmill in Linda from 1937 to 1984.

In 1986, some of the property owners sued the state for damages following the collapse of a levee.

== Demographics ==
Historical population
Census	Pop.	Note	%±
1960	6,129		—
1970	7,731		26.1%
1980	10,225		32.3%
1990	13,033		27.5%
2000	13,474		3.4%
2010	17,773		31.9%
2020	21,654		21.8%
U.S. Decennial Census; 1860–1870 1880-1890; 1900 1910 1920; 1930 1940 1950; 1960 1970 1980; 1990 2000 2010; 2020

Linda first appeared as an unincorporated community in the 1960 U.S. census; and then as a census designated place in the 1980 U.S. census.

=== 2020 census ===
As of the 2020 census, Linda had a population of 21,654 and a population density of 2,522.0 inhabitants per square mile (973.7/km^{2}). The median age was 31.5 years; 29.8% of residents were under the age of 18, 9.4% were aged 18 to 24, 29.8% were 25 to 44, 20.6% were 45 to 64, and 10.4% were 65 years of age or older. For every 100 females there were 101.1 males, and for every 100 females age 18 and over there were 97.1 males age 18 and over.

The census reported that 96.9% of residents lived in households, 3.1% lived in non-institutionalized group quarters, and no one was institutionalized.

There were 6,522 households, of which 46.4% had children under the age of 18 living in them. Of all households, 46.3% were married-couple households, 9.8% were cohabiting couple households, 18.6% were households with a male householder and no spouse or partner present, and 25.2% were households with a female householder and no spouse or partner present. About 18.1% of all households were made up of individuals, and 6.3% had someone living alone who was 65 years of age or older. The average household size was 3.22. There were 4,799 families (73.6% of all households).

There were 6,907 housing units at an average density of 804.4 units per square mile (310.6 units/km^{2}), of which 6,522 (94.4%) were occupied. Of the occupied units, 52.5% were owner-occupied and 47.5% were occupied by renters. The homeowner vacancy rate was 1.8% and the rental vacancy rate was 3.6%.

97.7% of residents lived in urban areas, while 2.3% lived in rural areas.

Racial composition as of the 2020 census
Race	Number	Percent
White	9,860	45.5%
Black or African American	997	4.6%
American Indian and Alaska Native	528	2.4%
Asian	2,633	12.2%
Native Hawaiian and Other Pacific Islander	122	0.6%
Some other race	4,340	20.0%
Two or more races	3,174	14.7%
Hispanic or Latino (of any race)	7,629	35.2%

=== 2023 American Community Survey ===
In 2023, the US Census Bureau estimated that 15.8% of the population were foreign-born. Of all people aged 5 or older, 66.1% spoke only English at home, 24.1% spoke Spanish, 0.9% spoke other Indo-European languages, 8.7% spoke Asian or Pacific Islander languages, and 0.3% spoke other languages. Of those aged 25 or older, 81.8% were high school graduates and 14.0% had a bachelor's degree.

The median household income in 2023 was $69,161, and the per capita income was $24,542. About 18.9% of families and 21.8% of the population were below the poverty line.

=== 2010 census ===
At the 2010 census Linda had a population of 17,773. The population density was 2,079.7 inhabitants per square mile (803.0/km^{2}). The racial makeup of Linda was 9,973 (56.1%) White, 722 (4.1%) African American, 361 (2.0%) Native American, 2,304 (13.0%) Asian, 80 (0.5%) Pacific Islander, 3,029 (17.0%) from other races, and 1,304 (7.3%) from two or more races. Hispanic or Latino of any race were 5,779 persons (32.5%).

The census reported that 17,752 people (99.9% of the population) lived in households, 21 (0.1%) lived in non-institutionalized group quarters, and no one was institutionalized.

There were 5,440 households, 2,700 (49.6%) had children under the age of 18 living in them, 2,635 (48.4%) were opposite-sex married couples living together, 1,012 (18.6%) had a female householder with no husband present, 485 (8.9%) had a male householder with no wife present. There were 542 (10.0%) unmarried opposite-sex partnerships, and 42 (0.8%) same-sex married couples or partnerships. 951 households (17.5%) were one person and 293 (5.4%) had someone living alone who was 65 or older. The average household size was 3.26. There were 4,132 families (76.0% of households); the average family size was 3.67.

The age distribution was 5,929 people (33.4%) under the age of 18, 2,054 people (11.6%) aged 18 to 24, 4,937 people (27.8%) aged 25 to 44, 3,561 people (20.0%) aged 45 to 64, and 1,292 people (7.3%) who were 65 or older. The median age was 27.9 years. For every 100 females, there were 100.1 males. For every 100 females age 18 and over, there were 96.1 males.

There were 6,084 housing units at an average density of 711.9 per square mile, of the occupied units 2,670 (49.1%) were owner-occupied and 2,770 (50.9%) were rented. The homeowner vacancy rate was 4.3%; the rental vacancy rate was 9.5%. 8,453 people (47.6% of the population) lived in owner-occupied housing units and 9,299 people (52.3%) lived in rental housing units.

== Media ==
MySYtv.com provides television coverage of local events in the area.

== Government ==
In the California State Legislature, Linda is in the 1st senatorial district, represented by Republican Megan Dahle, and in the 3rd Assembly district, represented by Vacant.

In the United States House of Representatives, Linda is in California's 1st congressional district, represented by Republican James Gallagher.
