= Paterno v. State of California =

- Full case name: PETER PATERNO et al., Plaintiffs and Appellants, v. THE STATE OF CALIFORNIA et al., Defendants and Appellants

Court membership
- Judge sitting: Thomas Matthews

Paterno v. State of California was a 1986 bench trial which ruled that the state was liable for the collapse of the Linda dam.

== Background ==
From February 15 to 24, historical flooding occurred in California due to an intense rainstorm. The flooding caused the Linda levee to collapse, killing two and damaging around 3000 homes.

== Lawsuit ==
In response, in 1986, 3000 residents of Linda, California sued the state of California, seeking reparations.
