= 1996 Yosemite Valley landslide =

Natural landslide

1996 Yosemite Valley Landslide
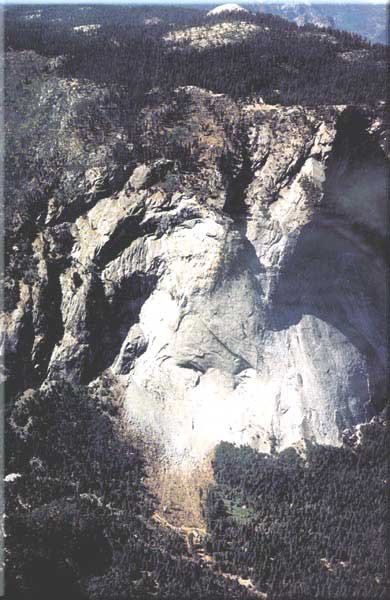
- Aftermath of the landslide
- Date: July 10, 1996
- Location: Yosemite Valley, YNP, Mariposa County, CA, United States; 37.729°N 119.561°W
- Cause: 162,000 tons of debris fell at speeds of up to 160 mph
- Deaths: 1

The 1996 Yosemite Valley landslide occurred on July 10, 1996, near the Happy Isles trailhead in Yosemite Valley, Yosemite National Park, Mariposa County, California. 162,000 tons of rocks and other debris fell to the ground at over 160 miles per hour. Of the 12 campers/hikers involved in the incident, one was killed. The landslide competes with the 1997 Merced River flood and the 2013 Rim wildfire for the designation of the worst natural disaster in Yosemite to date. The earthquake caused by the rock slide was followed almost immediately by a sonic boom. Soon afterward a granite dust mushroom cloud formed over Happy Isles. The immense pressure created at the base of the rock slide blew down giant pine trees. Afterwards the nearby campground tables and trees were covered with a thick coat of granite dust.

== Impacts ==
At 6:52 pm PDT Wednesday, July 10, 1996, a large block of granite, with an estimated volume of 78,000 cubic yards, detached from the cliff between Washburn Point and Glacier Point, in Yosemite Valley.

— UC Berkeley Seismograph Station

The first impact occurred at 18:52:28.0 Pacific Daylight Time (02:52:28 UTC), and the second at 18:52:41.6 PDT (02:52:41 UTC).

After detaching from the cliff, the rock mass slide [sic] down a rock shelf for 600 feet at an angle of 50 degrees from vertical and acquired sufficient speed to free-fall ballistically an estimated 1800 feet (550 m) prior to impacting about 200 feet (60 m) from the base of the cliff in the Happy Isles area of the valley floor in Yosemite National Park (field investigation with Gerald Wieczorak and Richard Waitt).

— UC Berkeley Seismograph Station

=== Effects ===
One of the impacts killed a hiker near the cliffs.

The force of the impacts was comparable to a 2.15-magnitude earthquake. The impacts also triggered the formation of a massive dust cloud. One witness "noted that the sky went black for six minutes as the dust raised by the cloud blocked out the late afternoon light." The rock fall also caused the uprooting or damage of about 1,000 trees in the immediate blast zone. Structures damaged by the snapping of these trees included the Happy Isles Nature Center, a snack bar, and a bridge. On the day of the incident, the park was hosting as many as 20,000 visitors.

== See also ==
- 1997 Merced River flood
- Happy Isles
