= 1997 California New Years Floods =

Extreme weather event, natural disaster, flood

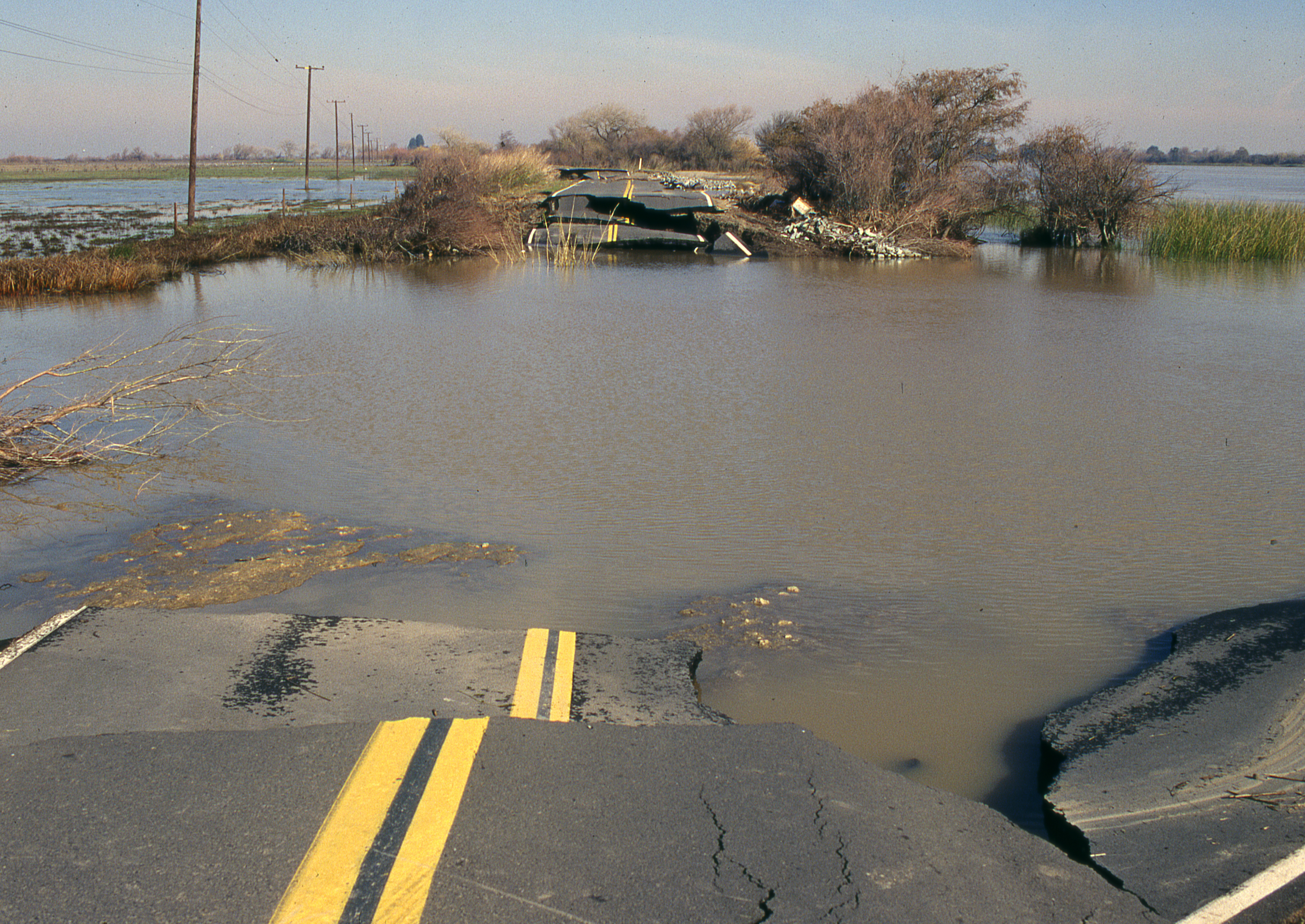
- A levee breach near Rio Vista on the Sacramento River
- Date: December 26, 1996 - Mid-late January 1997 (some areas)
- Location: Northern California
- Cause: Heavy rainfall and snowmelt
- Deaths: 9
- Property damage: $2.94 billion (2023)

The 1997 California New Years Floods resulted from a series of winter storms, from December 26 to January 3 of 1997, fed with tropical moisture by an atmospheric river. It impacted Northern California, resulting in some of the most devastating flooding since the Great Flood of 1862. Similarly to the 1862 event, the flooding was a combined effect of heavy rainfall and excessive snowmelt of the relatively large early-season Sierra Nevada snowpack. The resulting flooding in the Central Valley and other low-lying areas forced over 120,000 people from their homes and caused over $2 billion in property damage alone. 48 out of California's 58 counties were declared disaster areas with many streamflow gauge stations in these areas recording return intervals of over 100 years. It would take months for the worst-hit areas to recover fully.

== Meteorological setting ==
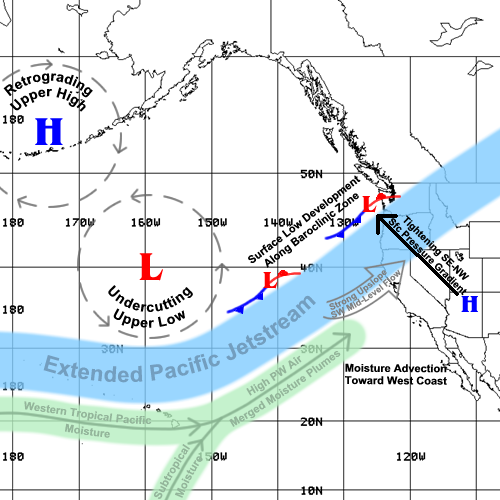
Synoptic pattern of the December 26, 1996 - January 3, 1997 storms

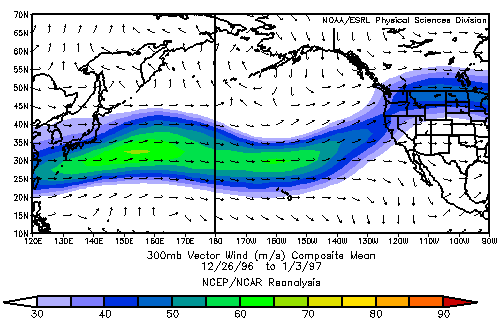
300 mb Wind Vector Analysis for December 26, 1996 - January 3, 1997

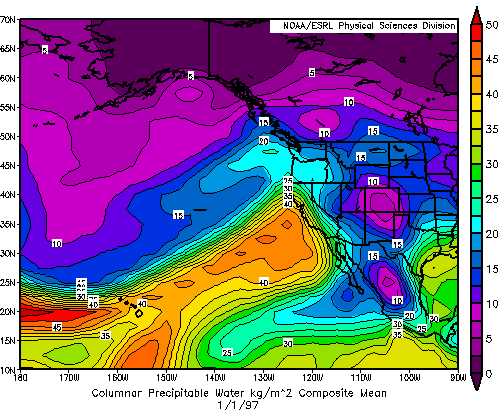
Composite Mean Precipitable Water for January 1, 1997

Before the warm storms arrived, a cold system brought 5–8 feet of snow to the Sierra with heavy accumulations even below 5,000 feet. from December 21–22. This storm along with earlier colder systems contributed to the large snowpack (150% to 200% of average) in the Sierra. During Christmas, a shift in the weather pattern to what is known as a Pineapple Express began the series of successive storms that contributed to the flooding. The upper-level ridge began to shift west with cooler air dropping across British Columbia. An upper-level high situated on the Aleutian Islands was undercut by an upper-level low and stalled between 40 degrees North and 160 degrees West. This and an upper-level jet extension with peak wind speeds of 180 knots in the Western Pacific ultimately contributed to the influx of tropical moisture into California. Precipitable water in the atmosphere peaked near 1.8 inches just off the California coast on January 1. Normally, the Sierras get about three times more rain than the Sacramento Valley, but during this event, they got up to ten times more rain because of the wind direction and strength of the winds.

The combination of slow-moving weather systems and strong winds brought warm, moist air into Northern California, causing prolonged and heavy rainfall. This warmth caused snow levels to rise very high, above 10,000 feet. As a result, most of the precipitation fell as rain instead of snow. This rain not only added a lot of water but also melted most of the existing snow, leading to even more runoff and contributing to the flooding. A very active Madden–Julian oscillation is also thought to have contributed to this extreme precipitation event.

== Precipitation totals ==
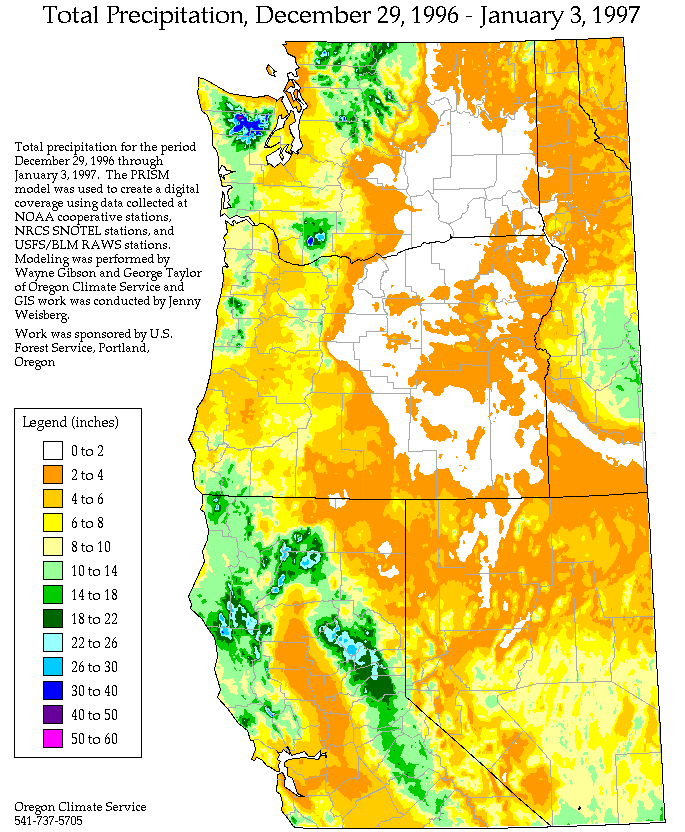
Map of total precipitation December 29 - January 3

Precipitation totals from December 26, 1996 - January 3, 1997
Location	Watershed	Amount (inches)
Gasquet	Smith	19.34"
Atlas Peak	Napa	18.44"
Venado	Russian	26.96"
Shasta Dam	Sacramento	23.70"
Bucks Lake	Feather	42.16"
La Porte	Feather	40.04"
Blue Canyon	American	36.34"
Sacramento	American	3.71"
Gianelli	Stanislaus	18.66"
Chilkoot Meadow	San Joaquin	19.29"
Redding	Sacramento	5.29"
Fresno	San Joaquin	2.39"
Bakersfield	Kern	1.10"
San Francisco	SF Bay Delta	4.45"
Ben Lomond	San Lorenzo	14.73"
Markley Cove	Putah	10.59"
Yosemite Park Headquarters	Merced	7.41"
Sonora	Tuolumne	8.12"
Eureka	Eureka Plain	8.46"
Calaveras Big Trees	Stanislaus	16.83"
Bowman Dam	Yuba	29.12"

== Impact ==
=== North Coast ===
During the December 26 to January 3 storm period, the North Coast river basins, despite their lower elevations, received significant precipitation ranging from 10 to 25 inches. The most substantial rainfall occurred in the Eel and Russian River basins, leading to severe flooding. The Russian River at Guerneville reached a flood stage of 45 feet, about 3.5 feet lower than the record 48.56 feet stage in 1986, but still the second-highest stage since 1995. The flooding of the Russian River caused significant damage to farmland and vineyards along the banks of the river including the city of Guerneville.

=== 1997 Merced River flood ===
The January 1997 flood of the Merced River (flooded/flooded from the watershed/floodplain of the Merced River) occurred from December 31, 1996, to January 5, 1997, throughout the Yosemite Valley in Yosemite National Park, Mariposa County, California. The flood stands as arguably the park's worst natural disaster to date (some would give this designation to the rockfall of 1996 or the Rim Fire of 2013), and inarguably the worst flood in park history. The Merced River at Happy Isles peaked at 10,100 cubic feet per second during the flood. A book was written on the flood later in 1997 by Mark Goodin titled Yosemite: The 100-Year Flood. It is part of the 1997 California New Years Floods.

==== Beginnings ====
Thoughts about flooding at the end of 1996 would likely have been directed toward a May 1996 flood that had been, at the time, the fifth worst flood in park history. The 1997 flood would soon bump this flood down to sixth on the list.

The last week in 1996, an unusually warm rain began to fall on the snow-packed mountains above Sacramento. The snow then began melting during a torrential 24-hour rainfall on January 1–2, 1997. The rain and melted snow overflowed small creeks and eventually the large Merced River, which flows through Yosemite Valley.

Although nearly simultaneous flooding of the Tuolumne River, also originating in Yosemite National Park, did little damage within the park, it did major damage downstream in the City of Modesto.

==== Effects ====
The flooding stranded 2,100 visitors in the park. Stranded New Years' vacationers were finally able to begin leaving Yosemite Valley on January 3, as the worst of the flooding was over, though the drive out of the park still saw many cars partially submerged in water.

All roads out of the park—Highway 120, Highway 41, and Highway 140—were inundated by the floodwaters.

Though there were luckily no human fatalities, Yosemite Valley suffered many damages. Trails and bridges were badly damaged, and about half of all accommodations were destroyed. Yosemite Lodge, which has its hotel rooms in separate individual buildings, had 189 cabins and 108 hotel rooms badly damaged or destroyed in the flooding, drastically depleting the hotel's capacity. Half of all campsites were destroyed. Trash cans, picnic tables, bearproof storage boxes, and fire grates floated down the river.

The estimated cost of rebuilding the Upper Pines, Lower Pines, and North Pines and removing the damaged Upper and Lower River campgrounds was over $8 million. Total park damages were estimated at $178 million.

Highway 120 west out of the park was inundated in many areas and closed for nearly half a year for repairs.

Damage assessment was delayed considerably due to a cold front and subsequent snowstorm that brought frozen precipitation back to the Valley on January 5.

=== Central Valley and Sierra Nevada ===
During the event, runoff from the Sierra Nevada basins that drain into the Central Valley was significantly increased by rain at higher elevations and melting snow. The New Year's Day storm tested the Sacramento-Feather River flood control system, which had to manage local runoff and reservoir releases to maintain its integrity. Prior to the major storms, reservoirs were able to reduce storage and regain flood reservation space based on forecasts and operations. However, the intense storms around New Year's Day quickly filled these reservoirs near capacity, necessitating increased downstream releases and setting new peak flow records into Lake Shasta and Lake Oroville.

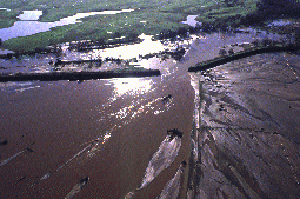
Levee break on the Feather River

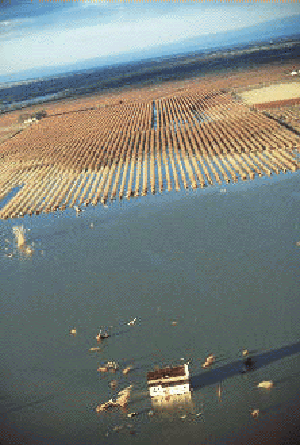
Flooding near Marysville on the Feather River as a result of a levee break

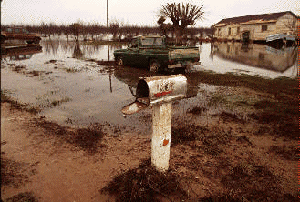
Flooding devastated Olivehurst as a result of a levee break on the Feather River on January 2

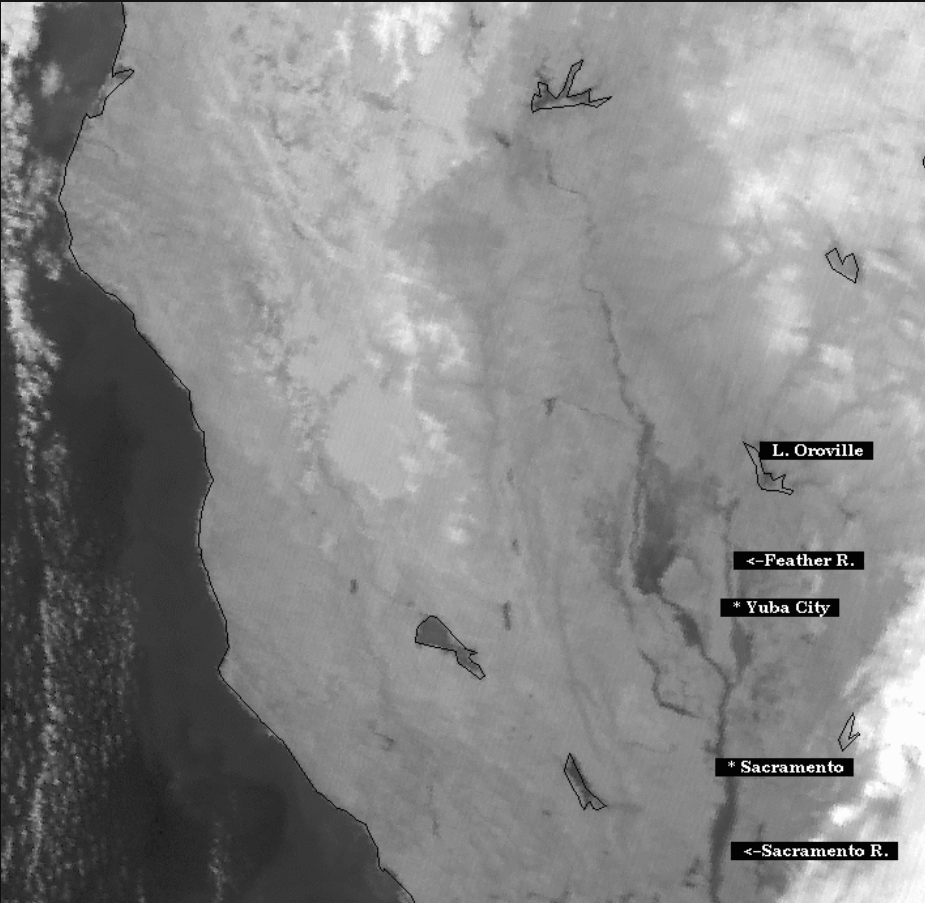
NOAA/NESDIS satellite image showing flooding in the Central Valley on January 5.

On January 1, the Napa River reached 3 feet above flood stage in Napa and Cache Creek reached a record stage height of 14.14 feet and a record flow of 13,200 cfs which only caused minimal damage in Yolo County. The worst flooding occurred on the Feather River on January 2. The river stage height peaked at 50.4 at Nicolaus (2.4 feet above flood stage). Multiple levees broke along the river causing significant flooding to Marysville and Arboga. A levee break south of Yuba City devastated the town of Olivehurst. Roughly 100,000 people from Oroville had to be evacuated due to the high flows coming from Lake Oroville On January 2, the Cosumnes River at Michigan Bar reached a record peak stage height of 18.54 feet and a record flow of 93,000 cfs. The Cosumnes flooded surrounding areas including forcing the closing of SR 99 and I-5. The river breached levees in many places and began to flow above the levees altogether. The communities of Sloughhouse and Wilton were also flooded as a result. The Yuba River at Marysville reached a record peak stage height of 91.64 and a peak flow of 161,000 cfs on January 2. The American River had its second-highest peak stage height ever at 26.40 feet and the second-fastest peak flow rate ever at 180,000 cfs due to high flow releases from the Folsom Dam. A mudslide blocked US 50 near White Hall. I-80 was also closed. The Merced River at Pohono Bridge in Yosemite reached a record stage height of 23.43 feet and a record peak flow of 24,600 cfs which caused some of the greatest flooding since 1862. For the first time, the Don Pedro Reservoir reached maximum capacity forcing releases with high flows downstream. As a result, the Tuolumne River at Modesto reached a record stage height of 71.21 feet and a near-record flow of 55,800 cfs on January 4. The record flows on the river caused considerable flooding to farmland and housing along the river and some neighborhoods in Modesto. The Dry Creek flooded neighborhoods near the Creekside Golf Course. San Joaquin River at Vernalis reached a record peak stage height of 34.88 feet and a near-record flow of 75,600 cfs on January 5. The San Joaquin flooded many communities along its banks, including substantial damage in Manteca. The Sacramento River at Verona reached a near-record stage height of 42.09 feet and a record flow of 102,000 cfs. Consequently, levee breaches on the Sacramento and the flooding of the Yolo Bypass inundated many acres of farmland. The Truckee River also had near-record flows with a peak stage height of 13.13 feet and a flow rate of 14,900 cfs at Farad (well above flood stage) which flooded Downtown Truckee.

== Aftermath ==
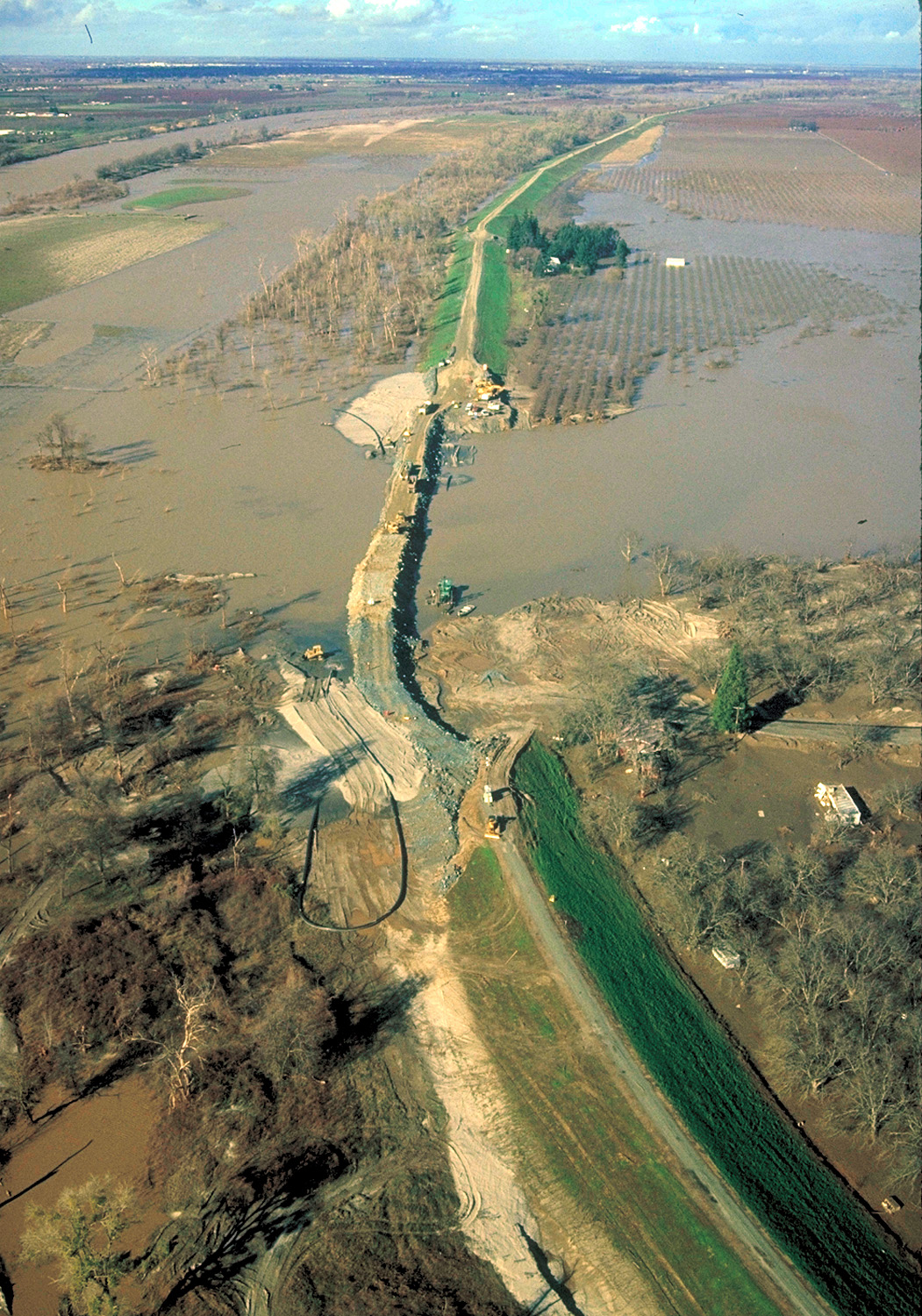
Broken levee under repair on the Feather River near Nicolaus

During the 1996-1997 water year, Northern California experienced extremely wet conditions in December and January. However, the rest of the winter and early spring saw little precipitation. Consequently, the snowpack in the northern Sierra Nevada was only 60% of the average by April 1, and many major reservoirs in California did not fill to capacity from the spring snowmelt. The flooding caused roughly $2 billion in damages ($2.94 billion in 2023) and was attributed to the deaths of 9 people. It took many places affected by the floods months to recover. In June 1997, Yosemite was provided with $178.5 million to repair and replace infrastructure, resources, and property damaged by the floods including an additional $79.2 million. It took until 2012 for the final flood recovery funds to be obligated. Since the 1997 floods, the California Department of Water Resources (DWR) has significantly improved flood risk management through better data collection, forecasting, and emergency response. Collaborating with various partners, DWR has implemented the Forecast Informed Reservoir Operations (FIRO) to reduce flood risks by optimizing reservoir storage. Technological advancements like LIDAR surveys enhance snowpack data accuracy, crucial for managing water supply. The department has invested billions in flood management systems, including levee improvements and habitat restoration. Public education and coordinated emergency responses further bolster California's flood preparedness and resilience.

== See also ==
- Floods in California

- 1955 Yuba–Sutter floods, another deadly flood that hit similar areas in 1955

- Floods in the United States
- 1997 Merced River flood - Flooding in Yosemite from these storms
- 1997 Nevada floods - Flooding from these storms in Nevada
- December 2010 California Floods- Took similar to floods in Southern California as a Pineapple Express storms, since the 1996-97 event.
- 2017 California floods - Flooding that occurred in the same areas
