= Bonny Doon Ecological Reserve =

Nature preserve

- IUCN category Ia (strict nature reserve)
- Location within California
- Location: Santa Cruz County, California
- Nearest city: Santa Cruz
- Coordinates: 37°03′2″N 122°8′29″W
- Area: 552 acres (2.23 km^{2})
- Established: 1989
- Governing body: California Department of Fish and Wildlife

The Bonny Doon Ecological Reserve is a nature preserve of 552 acres (2.23 km^{2}) in the Santa Cruz Mountains of California, United States. The reserve protects several rare and endangered plant and animal species within an area known as the Santa Cruz Sandhills, an ancient seabed containing fossilized marine animals.

The land was purchased in 1989 by The Nature Conservancy which deeded the property to the state, and is now managed by the California Department of Fish and Wildlife. It is adjacent to the Laguna parcel of the San Vicente Redwoods protected area.

The Santa Cruz Mountains are the only known location of the Zayante soil derived from the Santa Margarita geologic formation, that occur in three clusters in Santa Cruz County.

== Ancient seabed ==
The Bonny Doon reserve protects species adapted to a type of soil known as Zayante, a Miocene-aged marine sediment and sandstone soil from an ancient sea that encompassed California's Central Valley. As the Santa Cruz Mountains were uplifted, the seabed and shoreline terraces was exposed and is known as the Santa Cruz Sandhills.

The soil is almost 90% sand and little organic matter, found in scattered areas covering 8,400 acres (34 km^{2}). Evidence of the soil's marine origin include fossil remains of sand dollars, bivalves and gastropods.

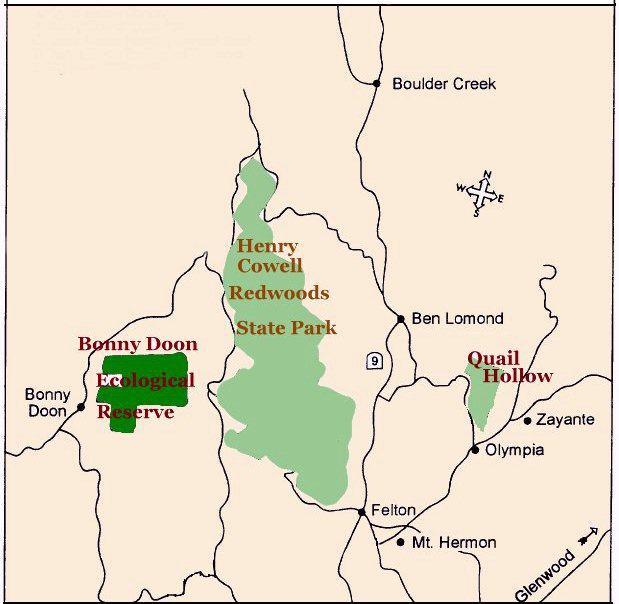
Bonny Doon Ecological Reserve

Botanist Peter Raven calls the Sandhills “the Galapagos Islands of Santa Cruz County”. In describing the area, he added,

"Dunes left as the ocean receded provide unusual habitats that form a mosaic of openings and unusual vegetation in the dominant forest vegetation of the region. As a model of the complexity of soils and habitats in California, the Sandhills stand out prominently! My early experiences in and around them helped to form my interest in botany and my passion for preserving plants worldwide.
“From a global perspective, the Sandhills are important because of their remarkable concentration of biodiversity. It affords a remarkable example of the persistence of rare species, of species found beyond their normal distributions, and of evolution in action.”

== Rare plants ==
The Zayante soils create a microclimate that is drier and warmer than the surrounding areas which certain species have adapted to. Because of the uniquely adapted flora, the Zayante Sandhills are considered by botanists as a " biological island".

=== Endemic to the Sandhills ===
The rare and endangered Bonny Doon manzanita (Arctostaphylos silvicola) or silverleaf manzanita is the most common species, and is named for the silvery sheen of the leaves and the nearby community of Bonny Doon where the perennial shrub is most abundant. The Bonny Doon manzanita is also found in Santa Clara County which borders Santa Cruz County to the east.

The Ben Lomond spineflower or Scotts Valley spineflower (Chorizanthe pungens var. hartwegiana), also called Hartweg's spineflower for Karl Hartweg who first collected a specimen in 1847, has been federally listed as endangered under the Endangered Species Act since 1994. A subspecies of the Monterey spineflower, it is an annual herb mostly restricted to the Zayante soils in the Santa Cruz Mountains, although there are documented specimens from San Mateo, San Francisco and Santa Clara counties as well.

The Santa Cruz wallflower (Erysimum teretifolium) is a biennial "monocarpic" plant, which means that it dies after flowering and bearing fruit in the second or third year. There are less than 20 known occurrences of the federal and state listed endangered Santa Cruz wallflower. A perennial herb of the Brassicaceae or mustard family, it blooms from March through July with yellow flowers on terminal spikes.

The Ben Lomond wild buckwheat (Eriogonum nudum var. decurrens) is a "species of concern" that blooms with white flowers from June through October and is easily confused with its close relative, Eriogonum nudum var. auriculatum or naked buckwheat.

=== Other rare plants ===
Other wildflowers of the reserve are not only rare, they have not yet been officially "described" by botanists. These include tipless tidy tips (Layia platyglossa), the slender gilia (Gilia tenuiflora) and the Zayante everlasting (Gnaphalium sp. nov.).

Rare trees in the reserve include as least two species of conifer. The ponderosa pine (Pinus ponderosa) or yellow pine is a common tree in the Sierra Nevada Mountains above 2,000 feet (610 m) but not seen this close to the Pacific Ocean. These pines were once considered their own distinct species, Pinus benthamiana, but later were lumped together with Pinus ponderosa, although other botanists still argue whether or not to put them in their own subspecies. "These pines have seven or eight features that are different from those in the Sierra", explained botanist Valerie Haley.

The Santa Cruz cypress (Cupressus abramsiana) is a conifer endemic to sandy soils on the western slope of the Santa Cruz Mountains. It is found in only five populations covering 350 acres (1.4 km^{2}), about half of which is in the Santa Cruz Sandhills habitat. The Santa Cruz cypress was federally listed as endangered on February 9, 1987. The first plant collection was made by M.E. Jones in 1881. The cypress is a closed-cone conifer that requires fire to open the cones for seed dispersal, although the interval between fires is critical for cypress grove maturity. June 11, 2008, the Martin fire burned 520 acres including more than half of the reserve, which closed until May 2009. The Martin fire could actually provide benefits to an area that hasn't burned in at least 40 years, and in some parts for nearly a century. "This isn't the way we want to introduce fire, but it's part of a natural process." said Jeannine DeWald, a California Fish and Wildlife biologist.

== Wildlife ==
There are two species endemic to the Sandhills that are federally listed as endangered: the Zayante band-winged grasshopper and the Mount Hermon June beetle. Also occurring in the Sandhills is the narrow-faced kangaroo rat. The rodent's name comes from the jumping style of movement, resembling the Australian kangaroo. Bird species observed include the long-eared owl, pileated woodpecker and Townsend's warbler. Other wildlife are the species common to forested mountain terrains like the coyote, black-tailed deer, mountain lion and raccoon. There are several species of bat, including the big brown bat, one of several species of bat afflicted with the white nose fungus.
