= Carbonera Creek =

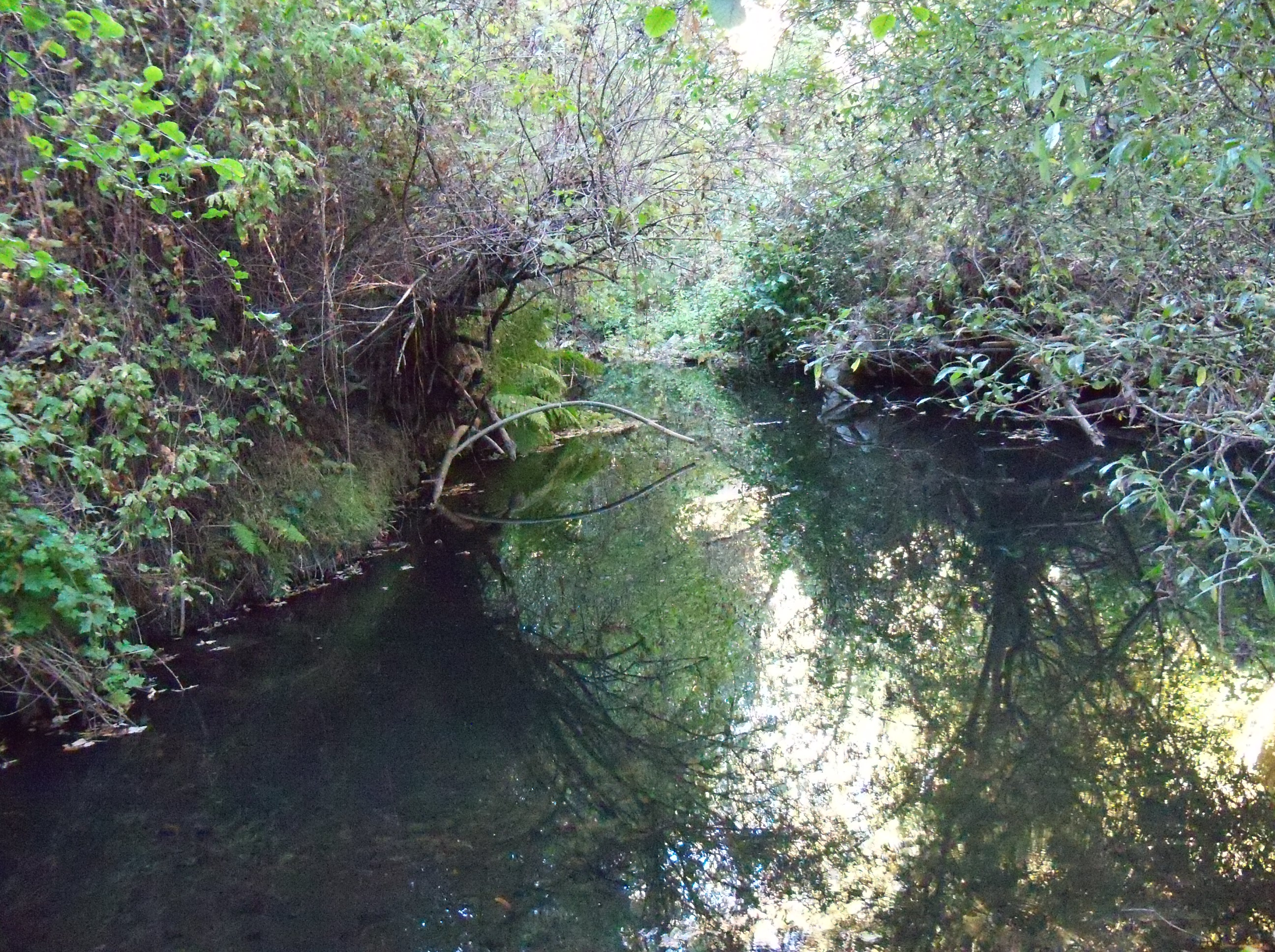
- Confluence of Carbonera Creek and Branciforte Creek

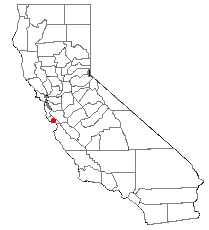
- Location of Carbonera Creek in California

Location
- Country: United States
- State: California
- Region: Santa Cruz County

Physical characteristics
- Source: Santa Cruz Mountains
  - location: near Laurel, California
  - coordinates: 37°5′23.81″N 121°58′47.86″W
  - elevation: 1,123 ft (342 m)
- Mouth: Branciforte Creek
  - location: Santa Cruz
  - coordinates: 36°58′26.82″N 122°1′19.87″W
  - elevation: 7 ft (2.1 m)
- Length: 10.2 mi (16.4 km)
- Basin size: 7.4 sq mi (19 km^{2})

Basin features
- Tributaries
  - right: Camp Evers Creek

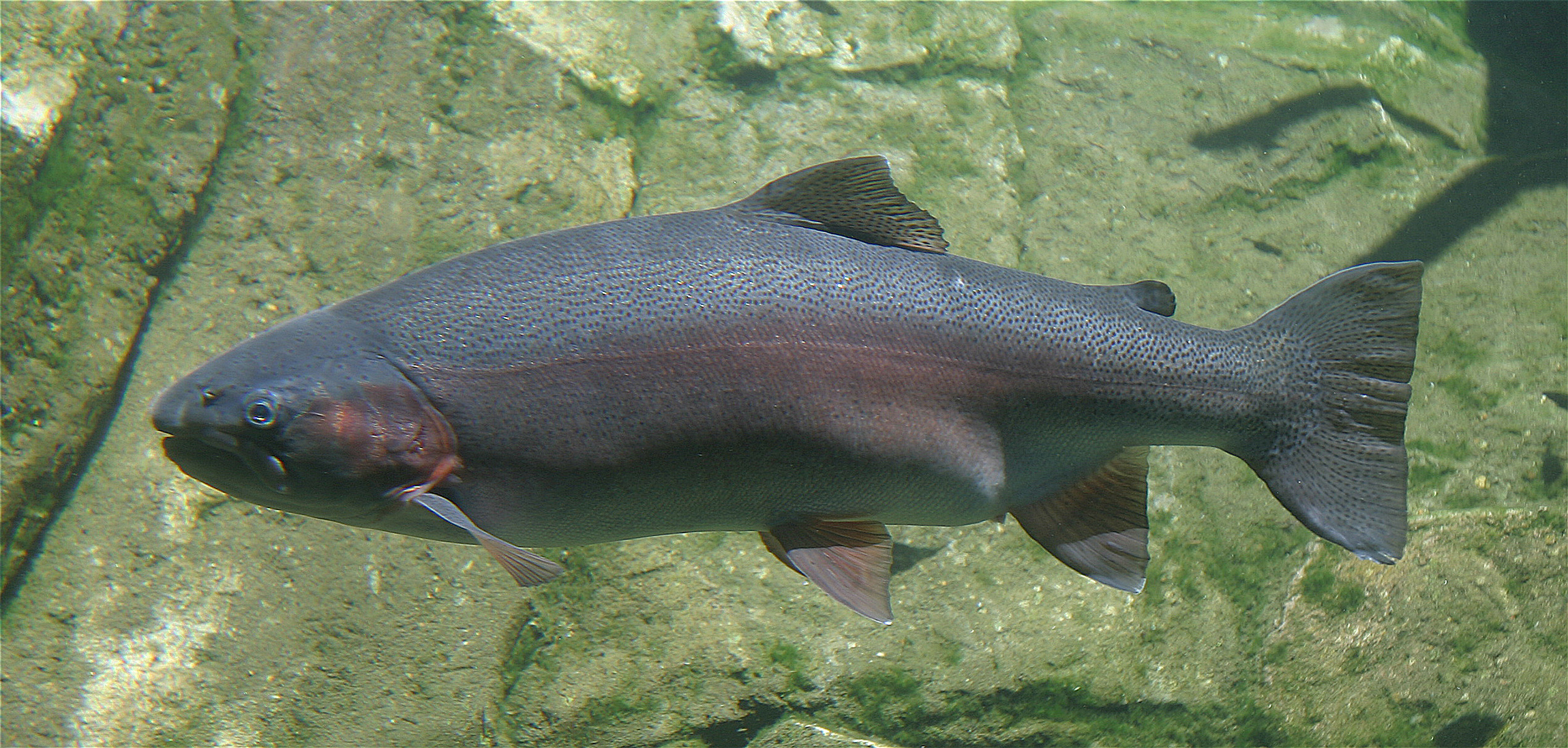
Steelhead spawn in Carbonera Creek.

Carbonera Creek is a 10.2-mile-long (16.4 km) watercourse in Santa Cruz County, California, that eventually flows to the San Lorenzo River.

The stream rises in the rugged Santa Cruz Mountains and flows in a generally southwesterly direction. The city of Scotts Valley is situated within the watershed of Carbonera Creek and its main tributary to the north, Bean Creek. Carbonera Creek joins Branciforte Creek near the 500 block of Market Street in Santa Cruz. Branciforte Creek discharges to the San Lorenzo River, which empties into the Pacific Ocean at Monterey Bay at Santa Cruz.

The perennial Carbonera Creek has a watershed of 7.4 square miles (19 km^{2}). The West Branch of Carbonera Creek is a total of 1.4 miles (2.3 km) in length and passes under Vine Hill Road. The West Branch continues under Scotts Valley Drive and the State Route 17/Granite Creek Interchange through a series of box culverts. The West Branch joins the main branch of Carbonera Creek immediately south of the State Route 17/Granite Creek Interchange. Carbonera Creek is the major surface water hydrological feature in Scotts Valley, running across the western portion of the Santa's Village site and through the center of town.

== Lake Carbonera ==
A Pleistocene lake located near the archaeologically important Scotts Valley Site covered most of what is now Scotts Valley, California. The lake formed at least 15,000 years ago. The surrounding area was heavily forested, and the lake provided an abundance of resources which supported early human settlement. Archaeological evidence suggests that people lived in villages on the shores of this lake as early as 12,000 years ago. They hunted deer, elk, geese, and other wildlife, and traveled to the ocean to collect shells and special rocks to make stone tools. The lake drained during the mid-Holocene warming period (4000 – 5000 years ago). When the lake drained it became Carbonera Creek and the people moved downslope following the lake water's transformation.

== Topography and geology ==
Elevations in the Carbonera Creek watershed vary from about 500 feet (150 m) above sea level on the valley floor to 1,123 feet (342 m) at the highest ridge.

== Precipitation and flow rates ==
The average annual precipitation in the Carbonera Creek watershed ranges from 85 to 120 centimeters per year, ninety percent of this falling between November and April. Carbonera Creek flows at an average of 0.8 to 1.0 cubic foot per second (0.023 to 0.028 m^{3}/s). Lower Bean Creek has a high average flow of 3.0 cubic feet per second (0.085 m^{3}/s). However, the flow in both creeks greatly depends on the season; in fact, flows in these creeks typically drop dramatically during the dry summer season.

== Ecology ==
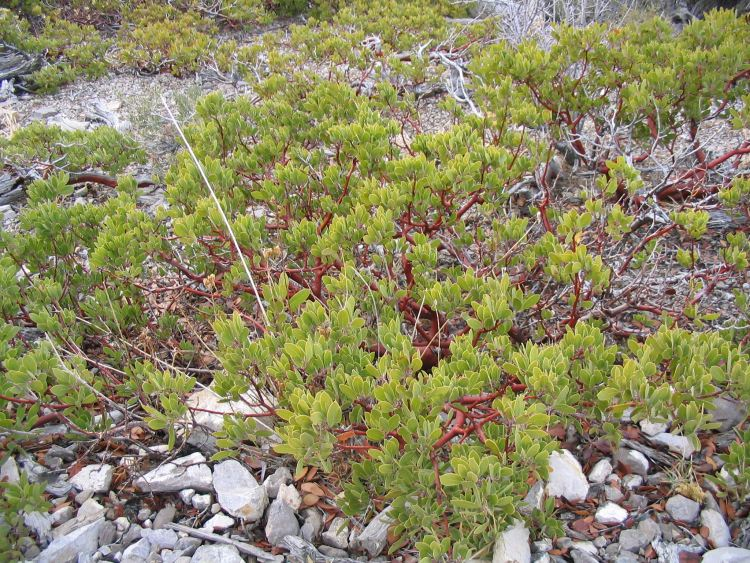
Arctostaphylos are common on the drier rocky slopes of the Carbonera Creek watershed.

Riparian woodland vegetation is located in Carbonera Creek and its tributaries. The 1990 Earth Metrics EIR identifies broadleaf deciduous trees as dominating this habitat and are able to survive because of the year-round presence of fresh water. Examples of such trees present in the riparian zone include California bay laurel (Umbellularia californica), boxelder (Acer negundo), California sycamore (Platanus racemosa), black cottonwood (Populus trichocarpa), bigleaf maple (Acer macrophyllum), white alder (Alnus rhombifolia), various willows (Salix spp.), and nearby valley oaks (Quercus lobata). Invasive root systems of these trees are important in erosion control and their dense canopy provides food and shelter for a variety of birds and mammals, yielding high habitat value. The lush cover afforded by this habitat also provides wildlife with a suitable environment for breeding. Additional vegetation found along creek banks includes California blackberry (Rubus vitifolius), Himalaya blackberry (Rubus procerus), poison oak (Rhus diversiloba), Naltic rush (Juncus balticus), redwood sorrel (Oxalis oregana), snowberry (Symphoricarpos rivularis), Coastal wood fern (Dryopteris arguta), and other herbaceous species and decaying vegetation.

The plant community Northern coastal scrub also exists in the Carbonera Creek catchment basin. This community is scattered throughout the basin, typically situated on windy, exposed sites with shallow, rocky soils. The community is dominated by California sagebrush (Artemisia californica); toyon (Heteromeles arbutifolia); coyote brush (Baccharis pilularis; California yerba santa (Eriodictyon californicum); and manzanita (Arctostaphylos spp.)

Within the Carbonera Creek watershed is one of the three known Maritime Coast Range Ponderosa Pine forests, a rare assemblage of vegetation narrowly restricted to sandy, infertile Zayante soils formed over Santa Margarita Sandstone. This habitat is only found in coastal Santa Cruz County and is found in a part of the Carbonera Creek catchment in the southwestern part of the City of Scotts Valley on the slopes of Mount Hermon, extending to the south. The surface soil and subsoil drain very rapidly and do not retain enough water to support local climax species such as Coast redwood or Douglas fir. The Ponderosa Pine (Pinus ponderosa) withstands the stresses of this xeric habitat and typifies the open plant community, which also supports rare species of flora such as the Bonny Doon manzanita (also called the silver-leaved manzanita) (Arctostaphylos silvicola) and the endangered Ben Lomond wallflower (Erysimum teretifolium). There are two Federally listed endangered species of insects within this sparse forest.

Aquatic species include steelhead (Oncorhynchus mykiss irideus, formerly Salmo gairdneri) (coastal rainbow trout) and Chinook salmon (Oncorhynchus tshawytscha), which migrate up the San Lorenzo River and its tributaries, including Carbonera Creek. For instance, these migratory fish species spawn in Carbonera Creek gravels downstream of the Santa's Village Area.

== See also ==
- Pleistocene "Lake Carbonera" (CA-SCR-177)
- Zayante Creek
