= Zayante =

Zayante may refer to several features and localities in Santa Cruz County, California.

- Zayante, California, an unincorporated community
- Zayante Creek, a tributary of the San Lorenzo River
- Zayante soil, an unusual soil that only occurs along Zayante Creek
- Zayante sandhills, an ecosystem that occurs on Zayante soil
- Rancho Zayante, a former Mexican land grant
