= Zayante band-winged grasshopper =

Conservation status
- Endangered (IUCN 2.3)

- Endangered (ESA)

Scientific classification
- Kingdom: Animalia
- Phylum: Arthropoda
- Class: Insecta
- Order: Orthoptera
- Suborder: Caelifera
- Family: Acrididae
- Genus: Trimerotropis
- Species: T. infantilis

Binomial name
- Trimerotropis infantilis Rentz & Weissman, 1984

Species of grasshopper

The Zayante band-winged grasshopper (Trimerotropis infantilis) is a species of insect in the family Acrididae. It is endemic to a small portion of the Santa Cruz Mountains in California.

== Background and description ==
It is known to be located only in Santa Cruz County, California within the Zayante sandhills, an area with little vegetation, primarily made up of sand and soil sediments.

The male grasshoppers range from 13.7 to 17.2 millimeters in length, and females a little larger from 19.7 to 21.6 millimeters. They have forewings that are tan to gray with darker bands, pale yellow hind wings, with one faint thin band that is visible when they are in flight; its eyes are also banded. Its lower legs (tibiae) are blue and gray. They have good flying skills, being known to fly distances of three to seven feet. They produce a buzzing sound while flying in order to avoid predators. The Zayante band-winged grasshoppers are similar in appearance to many of the other species of grasshoppers; the only difference is that they are found specifically in a distinct range of habit in the sandhills. The grasshoppers have a flight season that lasts from late May to October, their peak activities being around July and August.

== Habitat ==
A shallow sea once covered California's Central Valley and when the Santa Cruz Mountains formed, sand from the ocean floor was uplifted and created the sandhills ecosystem. The Zayante sandhills habitat supports plants and animals that are found nowhere else. It is one of the rarest ecosystems of California, and one of the rarest of the United States.

The Zayante sandhills ecosystem is not only home to the endangered Zayante band-winged grasshopper, but also to other unique species, many of which are on the endangered species list, including the Mount Hermon June beetle, Santa Cruz wallflower, Ben Lomond buckwheat, Bonny Doon Silver Leaf manzanita, Ben Lomond spineflower, and the Santa Cruz kangaroo rat.

== Threats and management plans ==
The Zayante band-winged grasshopper (Trimertropis infantilis) has been listed as an endangered species. The main threat to the species is habitat loss. The introduction of non-native plant species of plants has also impacted the grasshopper populations. Over-collection and pesticides have been identified as potential threats.

The loss of habitat is caused by urban development, agriculture, and sand mining. A large percentage of the Zayante sandhills have already been altered by these activities. Non-native species are taking over the sand hills, crowding out native species and degrading the grasshopper habitat. Two non-native species in particular, Portuguese broom and sea fig are significantly impacting the remaining ecosystem.

The U.S. Fish and Wildlife Service has designated critical habitats within the communities of Mount Hermon, Felton, Ben Lomond, Zayante, and Scotts Valley (10,560 acres or 4,270 hectares). Two Habitat Conservation Plans have been implemented by the U.S Fish and Wildlife Service.

Almost two thirds of the remaining habitat is unprotected and privately owned, complicating efforts to protect the threatened species. As of 2008, Santa Cruz County, the City of Scotts Valley, the United States Fish and Wildlife Service (USFWS), and various organizations and individuals are continuing efforts to preserve sandhill habitat.
