= Bean Creek (Zayante Creek tributary) =

Stream in Santa Clara County, California

Bean Creek Arcadia Creek
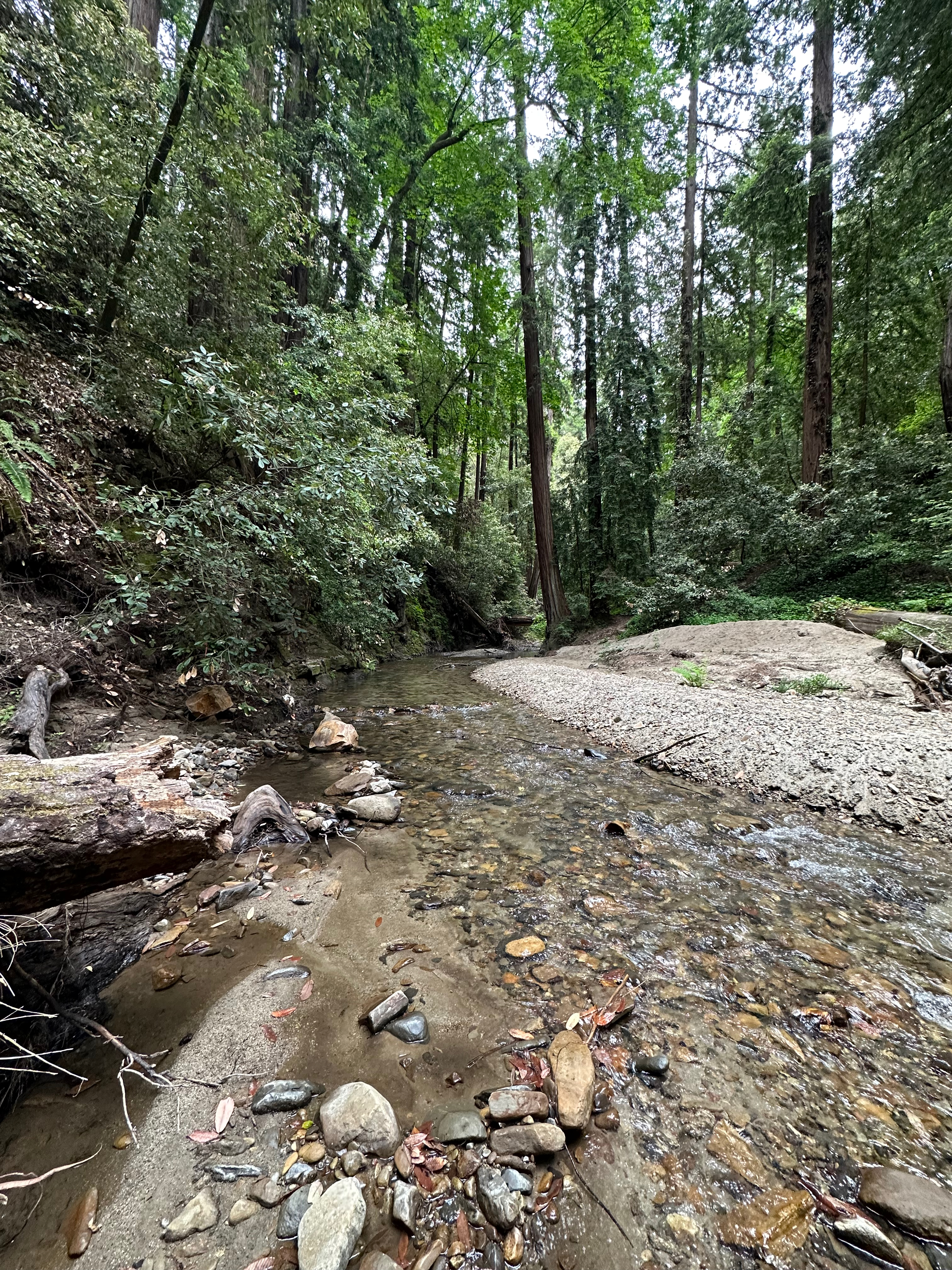
- Bean Creek as it runs through Mount Hermon, California

- Location of the mouth of Bean Creek in Felton, California

Location
- Country: United States
- State: California
- Region: Santa Cruz County
- Municipality: Felton, California

Physical characteristics
- Source
  - coordinates: 37°07′51″N 121°58′57″W
  - elevation: 1,920 ft (590 m)
- Mouth: Zayante Creek
  - location: Felton, California
  - coordinates: 37°03′5″N 122°03′41″W
  - elevation: 266 ft (81 m)

Basin features
- Tributaries
  - right: Mackenzie Creek, Ruins Creek, Lockhart Gulch

Bean Creek is a 9.1-mile-long (14.6 km) stream that rises on the western slopes of the Santa Cruz Mountains and discharges to Zayante Creek. This stream traverses relatively rugged, forested lands and is the locus of an important fossil bearing formation. These fossils are embedded in the Lower Santa Margarita Formation and include Astrodapsis spatiosus;also rare species of gastropod Thais cf. lapillis, and shark teeth (e.g. Isurus hastalis). After joining Zayante Creek, the flows reach the San Lorenzo River and then the Pacific Ocean at Santa Cruz, California.

== History ==
Bean Creek was named for James H. Bean, an early rancher from Virginia who arrived in Glenwood, California in 1850.

Bean Creek was also known as Arcadia Creek, named for the resort known as Arcadia and now Mount Hermon, at the confluence of Bean Creek and Zayante Creek.

== Watershed ==
The watershed area is 8.81 square miles (22.8 km^{2}) and the peak flow of Bean Creek has been measured at 1,380 cubic feet (39 m^{3}) per second. Significant groundwater recharge occurs in the streambed of Bean Creek.

== Ecology and Conservation ==
A 2004 fisheries enhancement plan for the San Lorenzo River identified Bean Creek as an "important producer" of steelhead trout (Onchorhynchus mykiss) young of year (YOY) and yearlings, and in 2001, an estimated 8,300 YOY and 3,000 yearling O. mykiss were produced.

Since 2001 the Scotts Valley Water District has monitored regularly at three stations within Bean Creek for heavy metals and nitrates.

== See also ==
- Zayante Creek
- San Lorenzo River
- Carbonera Creek
- List of rivers in California
- Lompico Creek
