= San Vicente Redwoods =

- CEMEX Redwoods, Lonestar Timberlands
- Location within California
- Location: Davenport, CA
- Nearest city: Santa Cruz, California
- Coordinates: 37°01′05″N 122°11′50″W
- Area: 8,500 acres (34 km^{2})
- Governing body: private

San Vicente Redwoods is an emerging 8,500 acres (34 km^{2}) mixed-use open space in Davenport, California. It is the largest privately owned parcel in Santa Cruz County, California, and one of the largest in California.

Since 2011 the land has been owned and managed by the Living Landscape Initiative, a consortium of local and national conservation groups, including the Peninsula Open Space Trust, the Land Trust of Santa Cruz County, The Nature Conservancy, the Save the Redwoods League and the Sempervirens Fund. The $30 million purchase from Cemex was supported in part by the Packard and Moore Foundations. The new name of the park stems from the San Vicente Creek which flows through the main portion of the park. A small exclave of the parcel straddles Laguna Creek to the east.

== Land Uses ==
=== Conservation and Research ===
The San Vicente Redwoods land is home to several species of wild animals threatened by the destruction of old-growth forest in the Santa Cruz Mountains. Native animals of particular interest include the California red-legged frog, a federally listed threatened species, and the endangered Marbled murrelet, as well as mountain lions, peregrine falcons and coho salmon. The endangered Mount Hermon June beetle and Zayante band-winged grasshopper are both endemic to this area. The Santa Cruz Puma Project uses the area for research on North American cougar.

Laguna and San Vicente Creeks provide domestic water to Santa Cruz and Davenport, respectively.

=== Recreation ===
The land has more than 70 miles (110 km) of gravel roads built by previous owners. It is adjacent to Big Basin Redwoods State Park, the Fall Creek unit of Henry Cowell Redwoods State Park, both managed by the California Department of Parks and Recreation, and the Coast Dairies parcel owned by the Bureau of Land Management. The Laguna parcel is adjacent to the Bonny Doon Ecological Reserve.

A draft public access plan was released in August 2014. A revised public access plan was accepted by the managing partners in April 2018 with a predicted opening date for the space in 2019. In August 2020 the CZU Lightning Complex fires burned the entire property. This delayed trail building further. In December 2022, 7.3 miles of trails opened to public access.

=== Logging ===
The new owners of the land plan to log a portion of second-growth forest order to fund the restoration and management the areas designated for recreation. The logging plan was submitted to the California Department of Forestry and Fire Protection in October 2014 for review. The plan calls for relatively low offtake and low-impact methods, and it excludes old-growth forest.
