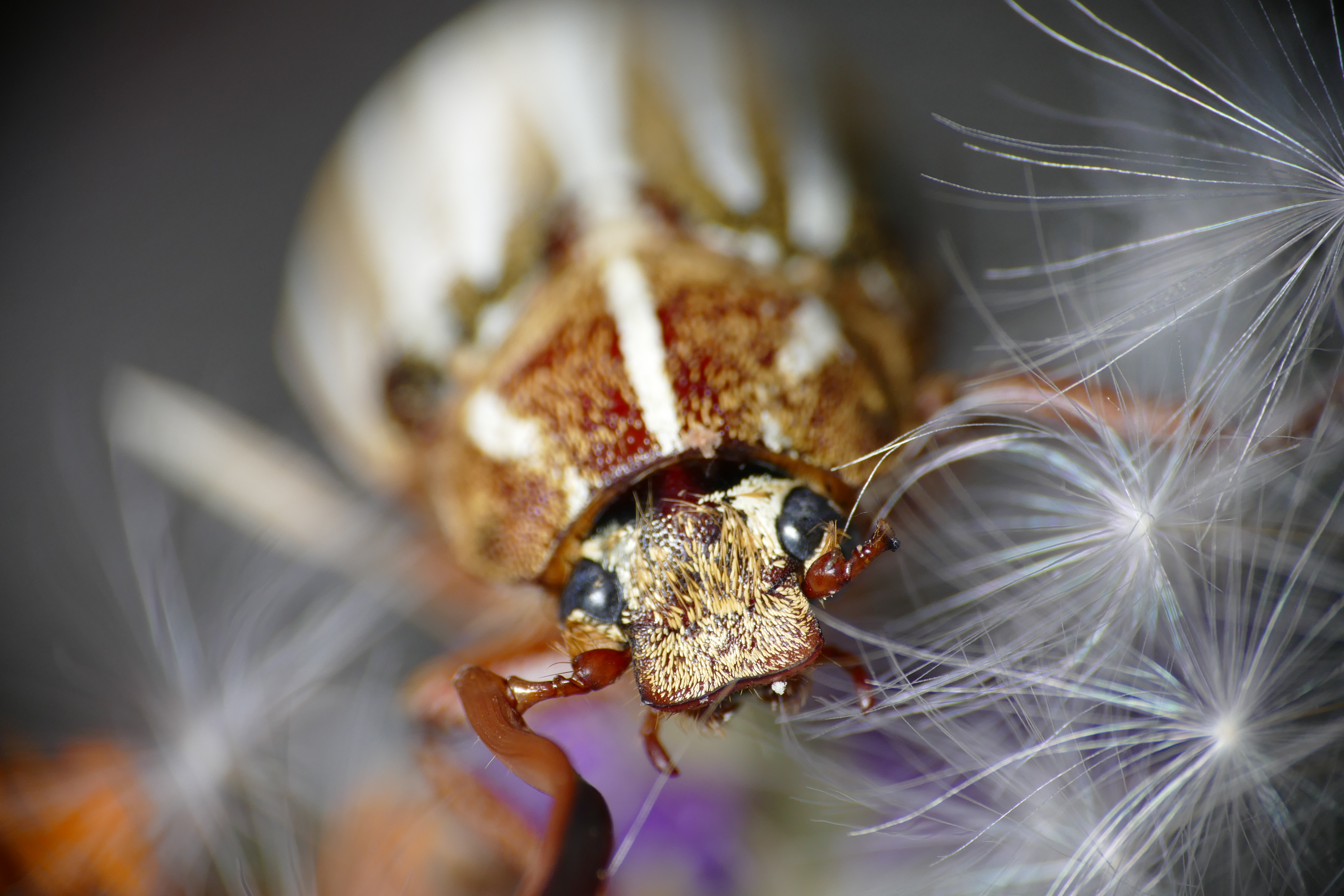

Conservation status
- Critically Imperiled (NatureServe)

Scientific classification
- Kingdom: Animalia
- Phylum: Arthropoda
- Class: Insecta
- Order: Coleoptera
- Suborder: Polyphaga
- Infraorder: Scarabaeiformia
- Family: Scarabaeidae
- Genus: Polyphylla
- Species: P. barbata

Binomial name
- Polyphylla barbata Cazier, 1938

= Polyphylla barbata =

Species of beetle

Polyphylla barbata is a rare species of beetle known by the common name Mount Hermon June beetle. It is endemic to California, where it occurs only in Santa Cruz County. There is only a single occurrence of the beetle on a stretch of territory of under 1,500 acres (6.1 km^{2}). This is a federally listed endangered species of the United States.

The beetle is about 2 centimeters long, black and brown in color with broken white longitudinal stripes on the back. The elytra are covered in a thin coat of hairs. The female is slightly larger than the male. The female spends most of her time underground, coming out only to mate with the male. The male flies between mid-June and late July, being most active between 8:45 and 9:30 pm. His wings make a crackling sound as he flies. The insect is an underground dwelling larva for most of its life cycle, and the adults may not feed at all. The larvae probably feed on plant roots and mycorrhizal fungi. The life cycle may be 2 to 3 years, but the male beetle's adulthood may last only a week and the female probably dies shortly after laying eggs.

This beetle was first described in 1938 from a specimen from Mount Hermon, California. It is limited to the Zayante sandhills, a region around Mount Hermon, Scotts Valley, and Ben Lomond in the Santa Cruz Mountains. This region is also home to another endangered arthropod, the Zayante band-winged grasshopper (Trimerotropis infantilis).

The habitat is ponderosa pine forest and chaparral with open, sandy areas forming pockets in the surrounding volcanic hills. There are several rare, threatened plant species in the area, including the Ben Lomond wallflower (Erysimum teretifolium), the Ben Lomond spineflower (Chorizanthe pungens ssp. hartwegiana), and the Santa Cruz cypress (Callitropsis abramsiana).

Over 40% of the Zayante sandhills region has been lost to human activity such as development and sand mining. Most of the home range of the beetle is in proximity to active sand mining operations. Fire suppression has led to an alteration of the normal flora of the area, with fire-tolerant plants being replaced by other species.
