= Rancho Zayante =

Mexican land grant in California

Coordinates: 37.060°N 122.070°W

Rancho Zayante was a 2,658-acre (10.76 km^{2}) Mexican land grant in present-day Santa Cruz County, California. The grant, measuring one league by one-half league (2,658 acres), straddled Zayante Creek and the San Lorenzo River. It included most of the present-day communities of Felton, Mount Hermon and Olympia, along with parts of Ben Lomond, Quail Hollow and Brackney, but not Zayante.

== History ==
Rancho Zayante was granted in 1834 by Governor José Figueroa to Joaquin Buelna, who had been a teacher in San Jose and alcalde of Branciforte (part of today's city of Santa Cruz). Buelna never occupied the land and the grant lapsed. It was re-granted in 1841 by Governor Juan Alvarado to Joseph Ladd Majors.

Joseph Ladd Majors (1806–1868), a trapper from Tennessee, came to California in 1834 over the Santa Fe Trail in a party that included Isaac Graham. In 1838, Majors became a naturalized Mexican citizen and, at least temporarily, changed his name to Juan José Crisostomo Mayor. In 1839, Majors married María de los Angeles Castro (1818–1903), daughter of José Joaquín Castro of Rancho San Andrés. Majors' new status as a Mexican citizen and member of the Castro family allowed him to apply for and receive the grant of Rancho San Agustin (today's Scotts Valley). Majors then acted as middleman to obtain the additional grant of Rancho Zayante for Graham, who was not a Mexican citizen and therefore was not allowed to own land. In 1852, Majors testified before the Public Land Commission saying, "It was granted in my name because I was a Mexican citizen and could hold land but I held it for Graham and others who, not being citizens, could not hold it in their name." Graham's reputation would probably have precluded him from achieving Mexican citizenship, and his personal prejudices prevented him from applying.

With the cession of California to the United States following the Mexican-American War, the 1848 Treaty of Guadalupe Hidalgo provided that the land grants would be honored. As required by the Land Act of 1851, a claim for Rancho Zayante was filed with the Public Land Commission in 1852, and the grant was patented to Isaac Graham and William Ware in 1870. A claim was filed with the Land Commission in 1853 by Robert Cathcart administrator for the Joaquín Buelna estate, but was rejected.

Edward Stanly, Isaac Graham's lawyer, acquired Rancho Zayante on Graham's death. Stanly laid out the town of Felton in 1868, named for John B. Felton (1827–77) who was mayor of Oakland, a University of California Regent and twice unsuccessful candidate for US Senate.
