= Zayante, California =

Zayante
- census-designated place
- Position in California.
- Coordinates: 37°05′20″N 122°02′29″W
- Country: United States
- State: California
- County: Santa Cruz

Area
  - Total: 2.82 sq mi (7.31 km^{2})
  - Land: 2.82 sq mi (7.31 km^{2})
  - Water: 0 sq mi (0 km^{2}) 0%
- Elevation: 699 ft (213 m)

Population (2020)
  - Total: 729
  - Density: 258/sq mi (99.7/km^{2})
- Time zone: UTC-8 (Pacific (PST))
  - Summer (DST): UTC-7 (PDT)
- GNIS feature ID: 2583188

Zayante (Ohlone: Sayante) is a census-designated place (CDP) in Santa Cruz County, California, United States. It is a residential area located on Zayante Creek. Zayante sits at an elevation of 699 feet (213 m). The 2020 United States census reported Zayante's population as 729.

== History ==
The Sayante, a local tribe of the Ohlone people, originally inhabited the area. Early history of the area recalls the Sayante people finding shelter and game in the plentiful forests. The area provided them with enough acorns, fish from Lompico and Newell Creek, and small game to live a peaceful, easy life. Temascals (sweat lodges), songs, and games were the rule, while fighting and thievery the exception.

In 1769, the Spanish explorer Gaspar de Portolá arrived to the area which is now known as the City of Santa Cruz. When Portola came upon the river which flows from the Santa Cruz Mountains to the sea, he named it San Lorenzo in honor of Saint Lawrence. He called the rolling hills above the river, Santa Cruz, which means "holy cross". Twenty-two years later, in 1791, Father Fermin de Lasuen established Mission Santa Cruz, the twelfth mission to be founded in California.

Over the next 20 years, word spread throughout the Ohlone tribes, including the Sayante Indians, that the Santa Cruz Mission would provide a regular source of food, even through the winter, warm shelter in the winter, clothes made from woven fabrics, manufactured items both useful (such as pots and pans) and curious (trinkets such as glass beads, etc.), and education, if they came to live at the mission. Unfortunately, once lured to the mission by these things, the Indians became virtual indentured servants. For the Mission system to work it required the services of large numbers of "workers" (to till the gardens, construct and maintain buildings, etc.). This was difficult for New Spain (Mexico) to provide because few there were willing to relocate to what was considered the harsh and primitive environment of Alta (Upper) California. The missionaries truly believed they were benefiting what they considered barbaric people through teaching them the manual skills of carpentry, European farming techniques, etc., and through "civilizing" them to the Spanish / European religious and cultural beliefs and practices. This process, called cultural assimilation, shattered the ancient native culture across North America. In addition, diseases which were mostly annoyances to their European hosts decimated the Indian populace, and only small groups remained after 1820. In 1821, Mexico achieved its independence from Spain, and California came under control of the Mexican government. In the 1830s, Mission Santa Cruz and other California missions were secularized by the Mexican government; only to seriously decline and, in some cases, fall into ruin. The very last of the Sayante people was a woman who lived for many years beside Zayante Creek. When she died in 1934, she was buried somewhere among the giant redwoods in Henry Cowell Redwoods State Park. Her grave, like her people, is lost now.

The Lompico area became part of Rancho Zayante, which was granted by Mexico in 1834 to Joaquin Buelna and consisted of 2,658 acres (10.76 km^{2}) just north of Henry Cowell Redwoods State Park. The next year Buelna let his claim lapse and, in 1836, the American-born settler Isaac Graham, with his friend Henry Neale, acquired Rancho Zayante and the adjoining Rancho San Agustin via Joseph Majors, who had the required Mexican citizenship in order to be granted a Rancho. In 1841, Majors, Graham, a German named Frederick Hoeger, and a Dane named Peter Lassen, agreed to erect a mill on Zayante Creek near where it enters the San Lorenzo River. This was reputed to be the first power sawmill in California and was used to mill trees from Lompico.

While building the mill (six years before discovery of gold at a saw mill being constructed in Coloma which resulted in the California gold rush), Isaac Graham found a single gold nugget worth $32,000 (close to $1,000,000 today). In comparison, the flake that set off the California gold rush was no larger than one's little finger nail. In 1855, gold again was discovered along Zayante Creek in what is known today as Henry Cowell State Park. During the summer of that year, miners realized three to ten dollars ($70 – $225 today) a day for their efforts and the gold panning fever spread throughout the San Lorenzo Valley and up into Zayante Creek and its tributaries, including Lompico Creek. Much gold still remains in these creeks but is too cost prohibitive to extract.

By the 1850s, Felton became the hub of the logging industry and the coastal redwood trees that blanketed the area became the largest export. Early loggers described the area as dense, nearly impenetrable redwood forests, howling canyons, and frequent encounters with ferocious grizzly bears, the last of which, a silvertip sow, is said to have been killed near Bonny Doon in the late 1880s. They also struggled with a lack of access and suitable transportation for the timber. Eventually the original trusty oxen were replaced by wood burning donkey engines, of which some tracks can still be found today in Lompico. Between 1890 and 1900, the entire area was clear cut and the forest is now in the process of reestablishing itself on the young, steep slopes of marine sedimentary rock common to the California coast.

As with most of the San Lorenzo Valley, once the logging era ended, the old Rancho Zayante was subdivided and sold off to land developers who created the neighborhoods of Olympia, Zayante and Lompico.

The name Zayante maybe from sayyan-ta 'at the heel' (Rumsen Costanoan). A parage lambda Sayanta 'place called Sayanta' is mentioned in July 1834 and the stream appears as Rio or Arroyo de Sayante on several diseños. On July 12, 1834 the name was applied to land grants. Named for either Zayante Creek or the Zayante tribe, Zayante was a stop on the South Pacific Coast Railroad that ran from Oakland to Santa Cruz from 1880 to 1940, primarily to ship lumber and various fruits grown in the area. Zayante had its own post office. The railroad was acquired by the Southern Pacific in the early 1900s, which added weekend excursion trains until the April 18, 1906, earthquake. Damage to rails, tunnels, and bridges was repaired and the railroad continued to operate until March 1940. Later that year, State Route 17 was routed away from Zayante and other stops along the railroad right-of-way.

Today, the area around Zayante is sparsely populated, and does have one small "corner" market, The Zayante Market. Ironically, this corner market first established in 1947 and left over from a time forgotten, serves as a model for future small town developments incorporating commercial and residential, or mixed-use development.

== Geography ==
According to the United States Census Bureau, the CDP covers an area of 2.8 square miles (7.3 km^{2}), all land.

== Demographics ==
Historical population
Census	Pop.	Note	%±
2010	705		—
2020	729		3.4%
U.S. Decennial Census; 2010

Zayante first appeared as a census designated place in the 2010 U.S. census.

=== Racial and ethnic composition ===
Zayante, California – Racial and ethnic composition Note: the US Census treats Hispanic/Latino as an ethnic category. This table excludes Latinos from the racial categories and assigns them to a separate category. Hispanics/Latinos may be of any race.
Race / Ethnicity (NH = Non-Hispanic)	Pop 2010	Pop 2020	% 2010	% 2020
White alone (NH)	614	585	87.09%	80.25%
Black or African American alone (NH)	10	3	1.42%	0.41%
Native American or Alaska Native alone (NH)	4	2	0.57%	0.27%
Asian alone (NH)	4	13	0.57%	1.78%
Native Hawaiian or Pacific Islander alone (NH)	0	0	0.00%	0.00%
Other race alone (NH)	0	3	0.00%	0.41%
Mixed race or Multiracial (NH)	16	40	2.27%	5.49%
Hispanic or Latino (any race)	57	83	8.09%	11.39%
Total	705	729	100.00%	100.00%

=== 2020 ===
The 2020 United States census reported that Zayante had a population of 729. The population density was 258.3 inhabitants per square mile (99.7/km^{2}). The racial makeup of Zayante was 605 (83.0%) White, 3 (0.4%) African American, 3 (0.4%) Native American, 13 (1.8%) Asian, 1 (0.1%) Pacific Islander, 22 (3.0%) from other races, and 82 (11.2%) from two or more races. Hispanic or Latino of any race were 83 persons (11.4%).

The whole population lived in households. There were 301 households, out of which 84 (27.9%) had children under the age of 18 living in them, 123 (40.9%) were married-couple households, 36 (12.0%) were cohabiting couple households, 88 (29.2%) had a female householder with no partner present, and 54 (17.9%) had a male householder with no partner present. 96 households (31.9%) were one person, and 48 (15.9%) were one person aged 65 or older. The average household size was 2.42. There were 169 families (56.1% of all households).

The age distribution was 116 people (15.9%) under the age of 18, 41 people (5.6%) aged 18 to 24, 192 people (26.3%) aged 25 to 44, 225 people (30.9%) aged 45 to 64, and 155 people (21.3%) who were 65 years of age or older. The median age was 46.4 years. For every 100 females, there were 113.8 males.

There were 339 housing units at an average density of 120.1 units per square mile (46.4 units/km^{2}), of which 301 (88.8%) were occupied. Of these, 238 (79.1%) were owner-occupied, and 63 (20.9%) were occupied by renters.
