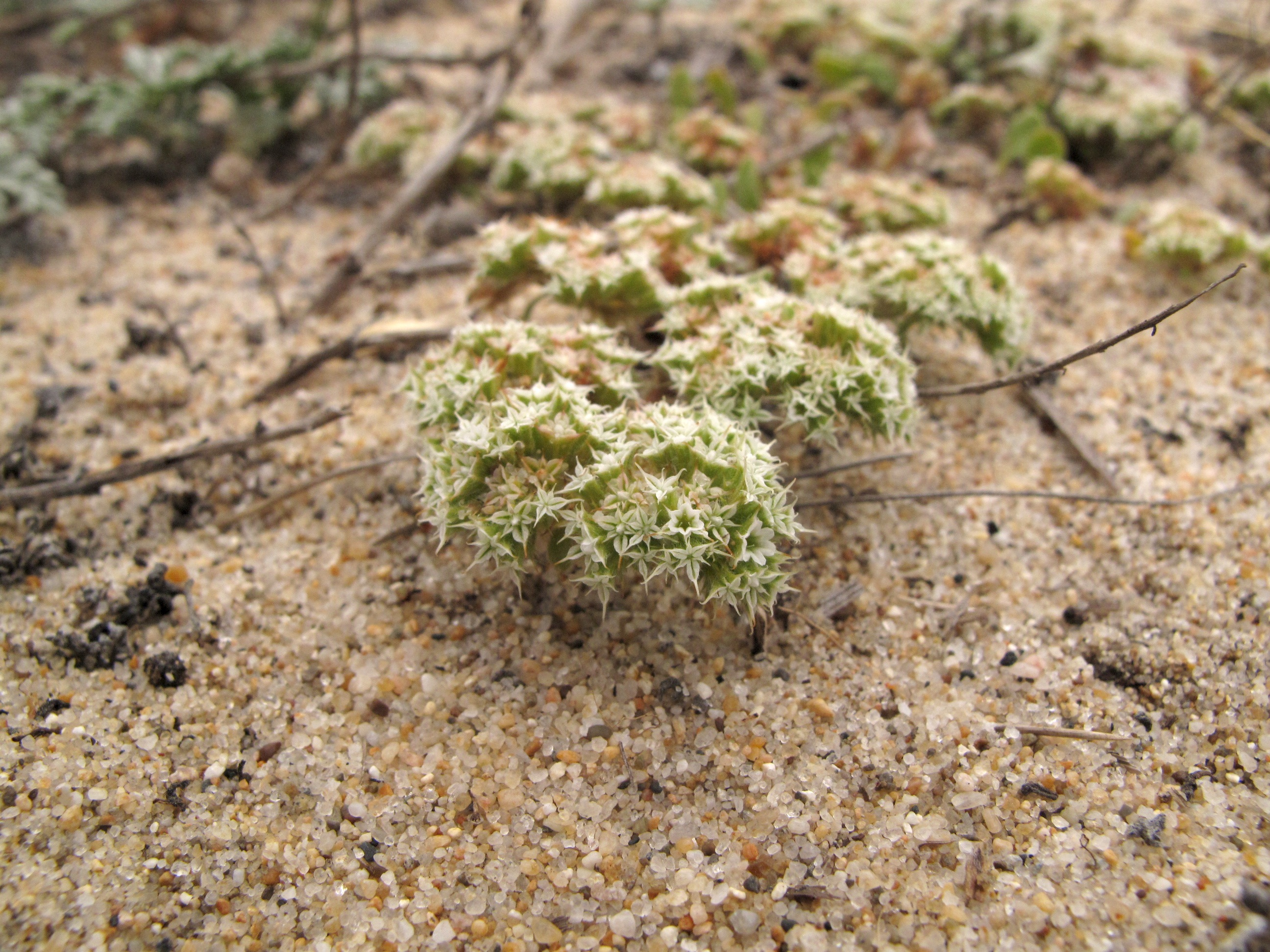
- var. pungens

Conservation status
- Imperiled (NatureServe)

Scientific classification
- Kingdom: Plantae
- Clade: Tracheophytes
- Clade: Angiosperms
- Clade: Eudicots
- Order: Caryophyllales
- Family: Polygonaceae
- Genus: Chorizanthe
- Species: C. pungens

Binomial name
- Chorizanthe pungens Benth.

= Chorizanthe pungens =

Species of flowering plant

Chorizanthe pungens is a species of flowering plant in the buckwheat family known by the common name Monterey spineflower. It is endemic to California, where it is known from the San Francisco Bay Area south along the Central Coast.

== Description ==
It grows mainly in coastal habitat and that of the hills and mountains overlooking the coastline. This is a generally erect but sometimes spreading or prostrate plant with stems up to half a meter in length. It is green to gray to red in color and usually hairy in texture. The leaves are located at the base of the plant; there are also bracts along the stem at the bases of the inflorescences which look like leaves. The inflorescence is a dense cluster of flowers, each flower surrounded by six white to pink hairy bracts tipped in hooked awns. The flower itself is only a few millimeters wide with jagged tepals.

== Varieties ==
There are two varieties of this species:

- var. pungens is the more common, but is nevertheless a federally listed threatened species under the Endangered Species Act.
- var. hartwegiana is known only from the Santa Cruz Mountains north of Santa Cruz. This variety, known as the Ben Lomond spineflower, is treated as a federally listed endangered species. It is found in the same type of unique habitat, known as the Zayante sandhills, as other local rare endemic life forms such as the Ben Lomond wallflower Erysimum teretifolium and the Zayante band-winged grasshopper Trimerotropis infantilis. Threats to this plant and other endemic species include the destruction of the local habitat during sand mining.
