= Branciforte Creek =

Creek in Santa Cruz County, California

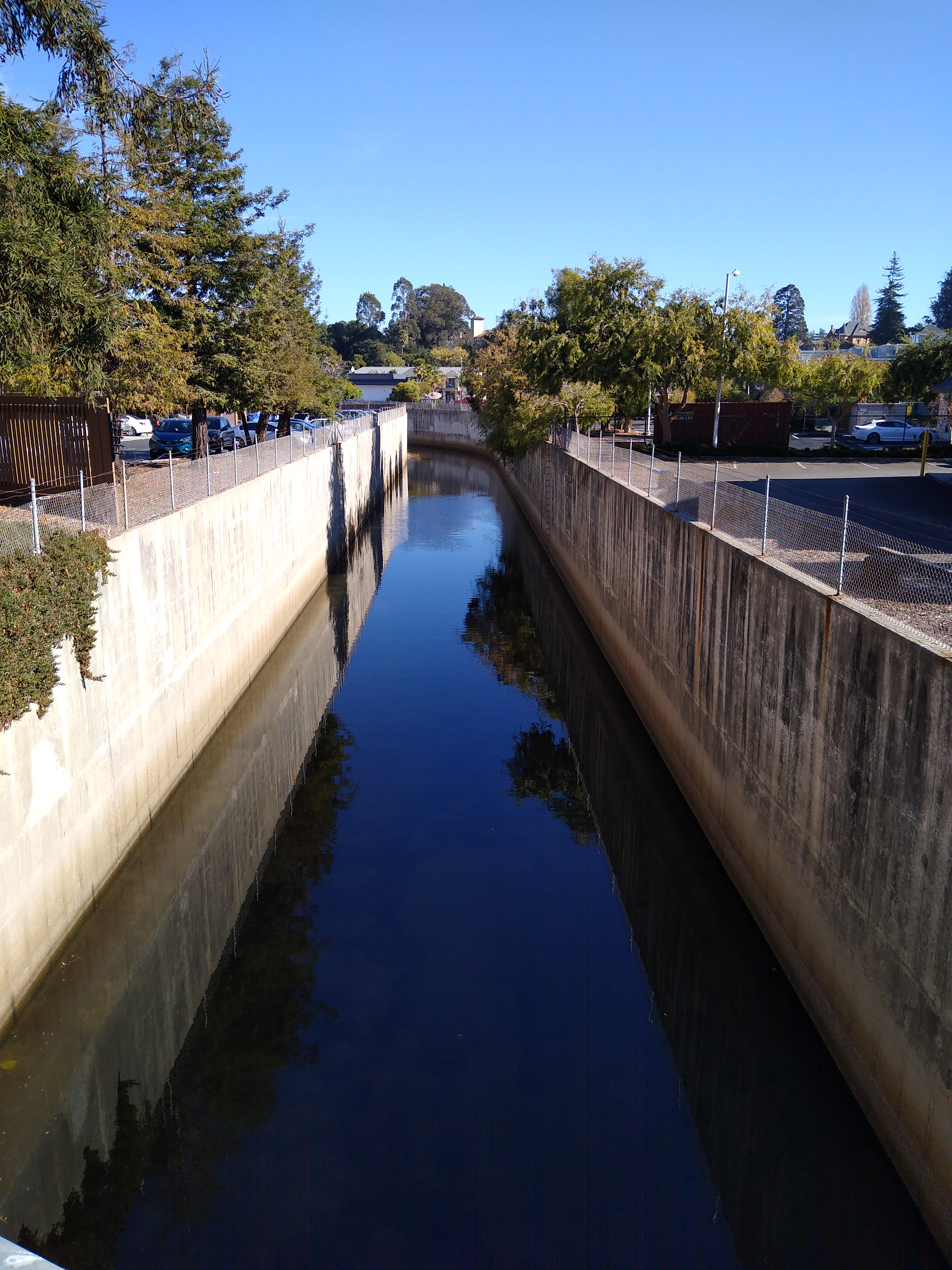
- A channelized stretch of Branciforte Creek within Santa Cruz

- Location of the mouth of Branciforte Creek in California

Location
- Country: United States
- State: California
- Counties: Santa Cruz

Physical characteristics
- Source: Santa Cruz Mountains
  - location: near Laurel
  - coordinates: 37°5′1.81″N 121°58′12.85″W
  - elevation: 1,000 ft (300 m)
- Mouth: San Lorenzo River
  - location: Santa Cruz
  - coordinates: 36°59′12.82″N 122°0′49.87″W
  - elevation: 43 ft (13 m)
- Length: 9 mi (14 km)
- Basin size: 7.1 sq mi (18 km^{2})

Basin features
- Tributaries
  - left: Crystal Creek
  - right: Blackburn Gulch, Tie Gulch, Granite Creek, Redwood Creek, Carbonera Creek

Branciforte Creek is a 5.8-mile (9.3 km) long watercourse in Santa Cruz County, California, United States. Branciforte Creek rises on the western slopes of the Santa Cruz Mountains and discharges to the San Lorenzo River, which in turn empties into the Pacific Ocean. Within the State of California Branciforte Creek is classified within the Central Coast Basin. As of the year 2002, the State of California has designated Branciforte Creek as impaired with respect to turbidity and pathogens. The Branciforte watershed consists of 6,231 acres (25.22 km^{2}), approximately 70 percent of which is covered with mixed evergreen forest, conifer forest and other undisturbed habitats.

In 2001, a stream restoration project was funded by the State of California to remove barriers to anadromous fish migration in Branciforte Creek, with emphasis upon enhancing juvenile migration. Ongoing flood control maintenance is performed on certain lower reaches of Branciforte Creek.

== See also ==
- Sediment
- Steelhead
