= Scotts Valley Site =

Lithic stage archaeological site

The Scotts Valley Site (CA-SCAR-177), also known as the Lake Carbonera Site, is an archaeological site which has been documented as one of the oldest human settlement sites in Central California. Dated at 12,000-9,000 years before present, it is located in Scotts Valley, California, in the United States, at what was once a large pluvial lake.

== Early Human Settlement In California ==
Current knowledge suggests that the Americas were populated at multiple times periods and via different migration routes. The earliest migrations seem to have occurred around 25–20,000 years ago, by watercraft along the west coast of North America.. The migrating people utilized oceanic resources (an ecological zone referred to as the “Kelp Highway”), which extended from Asia to South America. The different kelps of the Pacific Rim are major contributors to the areas of productivity and biodiversity and support a wide variety of life such as marine mammals, shellfish, fish, seabirds and edible seaweeds. This biodiversity was a key condition that supported human migration.

In California, archeological sites with dates that support human settlement in the migration period 12,000 - 7,000 ybp are: Borax Lake, the Cross Creek Site, Santa Barbara Channel Islands, Santa Barbara Coast's Sudden Flats, and the Scotts Valley site, CA-SCR-177. Recent research at the Sudden Flats site along the Central California Coast proposes three different lithic technology traditions which may indicate three different migrating groups. Archaeological data for CA-SCR-177 indicates settlement dates as old as 12,000 -9,000 ybc. These dates are based on carbon dates, geological context, and artifact styles, such as eccentrics (or crescents) stone tools and large leaf style projectile points. Archaeological research ties some of the artifacts found at the Scotts Valley site, such as the crescent tool, to the "Western Pluvial Lake Tradition" which dates to the 12,000 to 7,000 ybp.

== Pleistocene Lake Environment and Culture ==
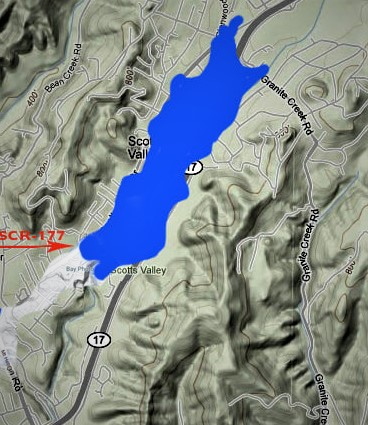
The outline of ancient Pleistocene Lake Carbonera superimposed on a contemporary map of Scotts Valley, Ca.

Lake Carbonera was a Pleistocene lake covering the area now known as Scotts Valley, California. The lake formed at least 15,000 years ago. The surrounding area was heavily forested, and the lake provided an abundance of resources which supported early human settlement. Archaeological evidence suggests that people lived in villages on the shores of this lake as early as 12,000 years ago. They hunted deer, elk, geese, and other wildlife, and traveled to the ocean to collect shells and special rocks to make stone tools. The lake drained during the Mid-Holocene warming period (4000 –5000 years ago). When the lake drained, the people moved downslope following the lake water's transformation into what is now called Carbonera Creek.

== Documenting Site ==
This ancient settlement was first recorded as an archaeological site (CA-SCR-177) in 1978. In 1980, this record was re-tested by Archaeological Research Management and a report was delivered to the Scotts Valley City Council noting its importance as a cultural resource.

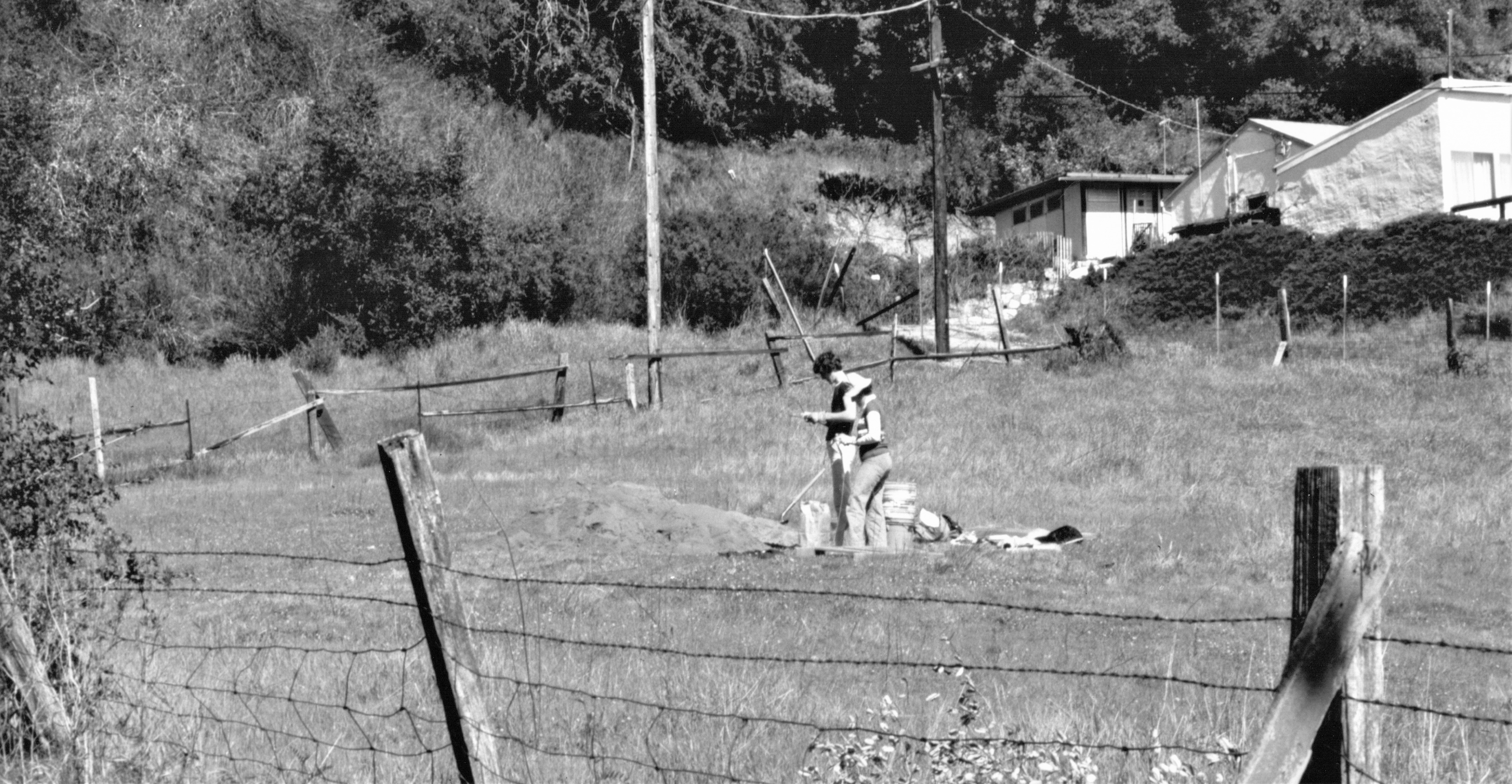
Testing of CA-SCR-177 in 1980.

After appeals by the Santa Cruz Archaeological Society to protect this site were ignored by the City Council, the Society sued (Nov. 1981) to have the Cultural Resource Materials considered under CEQA (California Environmental Quality Act). In Nov. 1982, in an out- of-court settlement, the City of Scotts Valley agreed to change their planning procedures to consider cultural resources more fully in the future, and to fund (via the Society) efforts to document and expand the archaeological sample at the site that were damaged to see if more information could be gathered about the age and significance of the site.

== Excavations ==
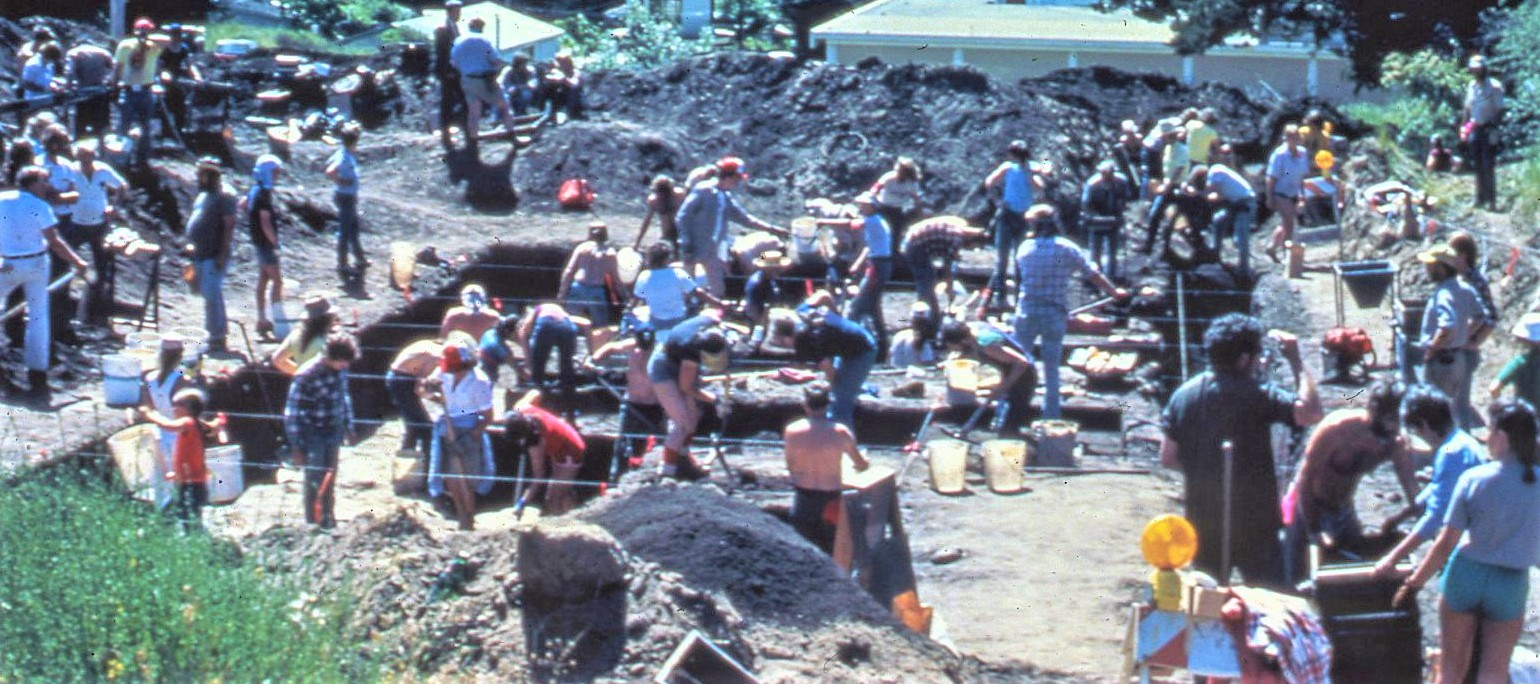
Scotts Valley volunteers at SCR-177. Memorial Day, 1983

The Santa Cruz Archaeological Society organized for Memorial Day weekend, 1983, what would turn out to be the largest volunteer excavation crew ever assembled for such an occasion. This work supported the previous research and led the City of Scotts Valley to have to fund a large excavation in 1987 as the project development plans were changed. These volunteer excavations produced artifacts and other data that supported the previous research; including a chert crescent tool and a leaf-shaped chert biface that supported an estimated date of 10,000 - 7,000 YBP, and a metate feature, which is one of the oldest dated examples of ground-stone in California.

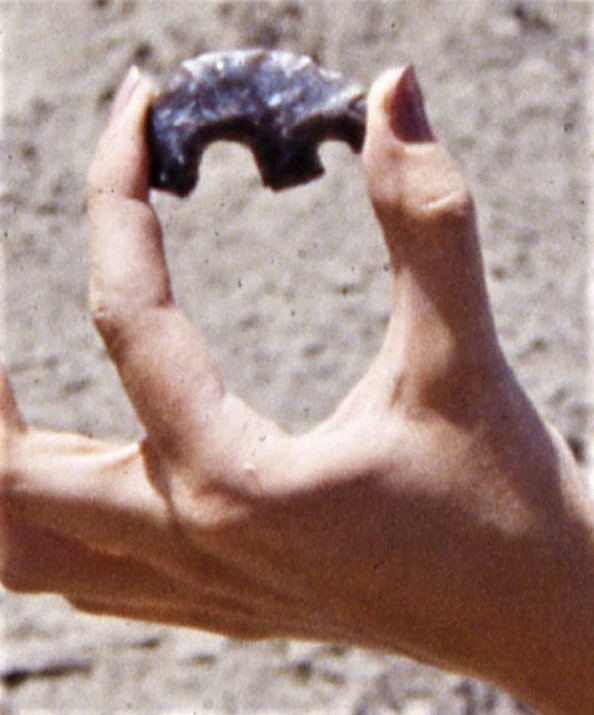
Eccentric crescent tool, found 1983.

== Analysis and post-excavation research ==
Many scholars were involved in the analysis of the over 13,000 stone tools, artifacts and ecofacts from both the 1983 and 1987 excavations under the coordination of Dr. Robert Cartier. Documentation and artifacts that were discovered in both excavations were later archived at UC Santa Cruz. A final monograph was published by the Santa Cruz Archaeological Society and A.R.M. The monograph reported on the extensive analyses done that related both to the findings in time (back 12,000 years) and space (to previous archaeological findings in Western North America). A series of chapters, written by various scholars, includes careful examination of the history of what produced the excavation, how the volunteer excavation was carried out, and the analysis of the various data generated from both the 1983 and 1987 excavations.

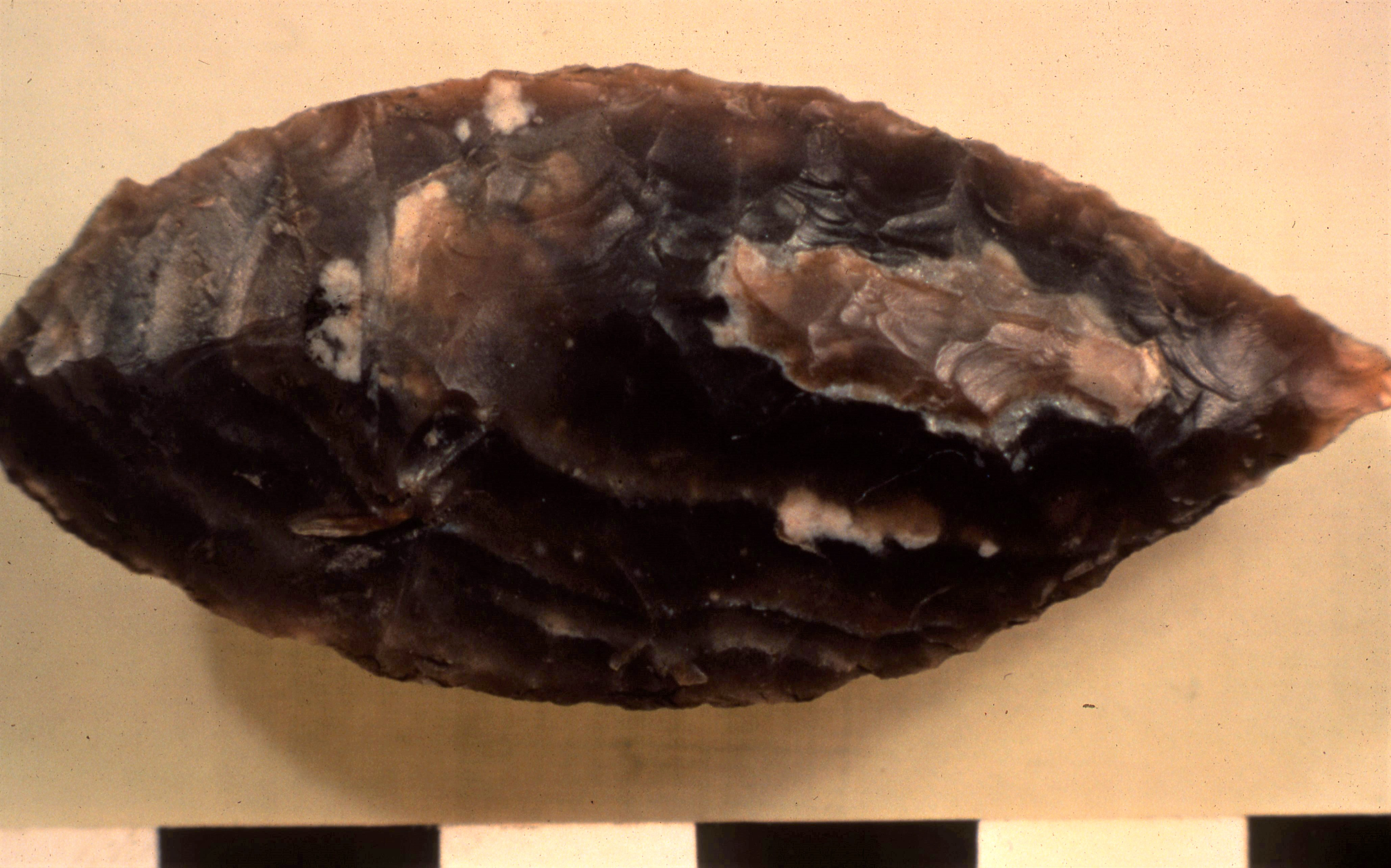
Large biface leaf-shaped chert tool excavated at CA-SCR-177, 1983.

The findings concluded that based on the thirty-seven radio carbon dates, the seventy-two obsidian hydration readings, the well-dated stratigraphic profile, and the diagnostic style of the artifacts that all data supported the 7 to 12,000-year-old antiquity of CA-SCR-177.

Cartier notes in his concluding comments:

- "the exceptional character of the Scotts Valley site lies in its well-documented antiquity, its long duration of occupation...and the relative integrity of its site structure".
- "few archaeological sites known of this antiquity with this degree of dating".
- While its occupation seems to have been episodic, it "contains one of the longest records of human occupation yet known (as of 1993) for western North America".

Archaeologist Gerrit Fenenga, in his chapter in the monograph, adds, "The Scotts Valley Site is clearly of great significance locally, regionally, statewide and in North America".
