= Bonny Doon Village Airport =

Bonny Doon Airport
- IATA: none; ICAO: none; FAA LID: CL77

Summary
- Airport type: Private
- Owner: Bonny Doon Airport LLC
- Serves: Santa Cruz, California and Bonny Doon, California
- Location: Bonny Doon, California
- Elevation AMSL: 2,020 ft / 616 m
- Coordinates: 037°04′14″N 122°07′39″W

Map
- Location in California

Runways
Direction	Length		Surface
Direction	ft	m	Surface
12/30	2,400	731.52	Asphalt

Bonny Doon Village Airport - FAA Identifier CL77, is a private, single-runway airport located 8 miles northwest of Santa Cruz, California at an elevation of 2020 feet in the mountain community of Bonny Doon. The airport has no air traffic control tower or other aviation services. Due to surrounding terrain, Runway 12 is used for departure with a usable length of 2400 feet. Runway 30 is used for landing and has a threshold displaced 390 ft. The traffic pattern altitude has been established at 1000 feet above ground level with a left turn landing pattern. The 35 foot wide asphalt runway is marked and well maintained. Although the field has a lighted windsock and non FAA compliant runway lighting, the airport is approved for day use only. Prior permission for use is required from the airport owner.

== History ==
The Bonny Doon Village Airport runway and original hangar were constructed in the early 1930s by Gus Zeitler making it one of the older airports in Santa Cruz County. It was originally called Sky Ranch. During the 1950s, Marion Nichols, "The Flying Realtor" planned to develop the airport and surrounding community, but was unsuccessful. In 1992 pilot and actor John Travolta considered purchasing the facility, but determined the field would not accommodate his aircraft.

The airport is a component of emergency medical and fire response for the community of Bonny Doon. Also located at the field is a seismic measuring device that continuously transmits data to a processing center in Colorado.

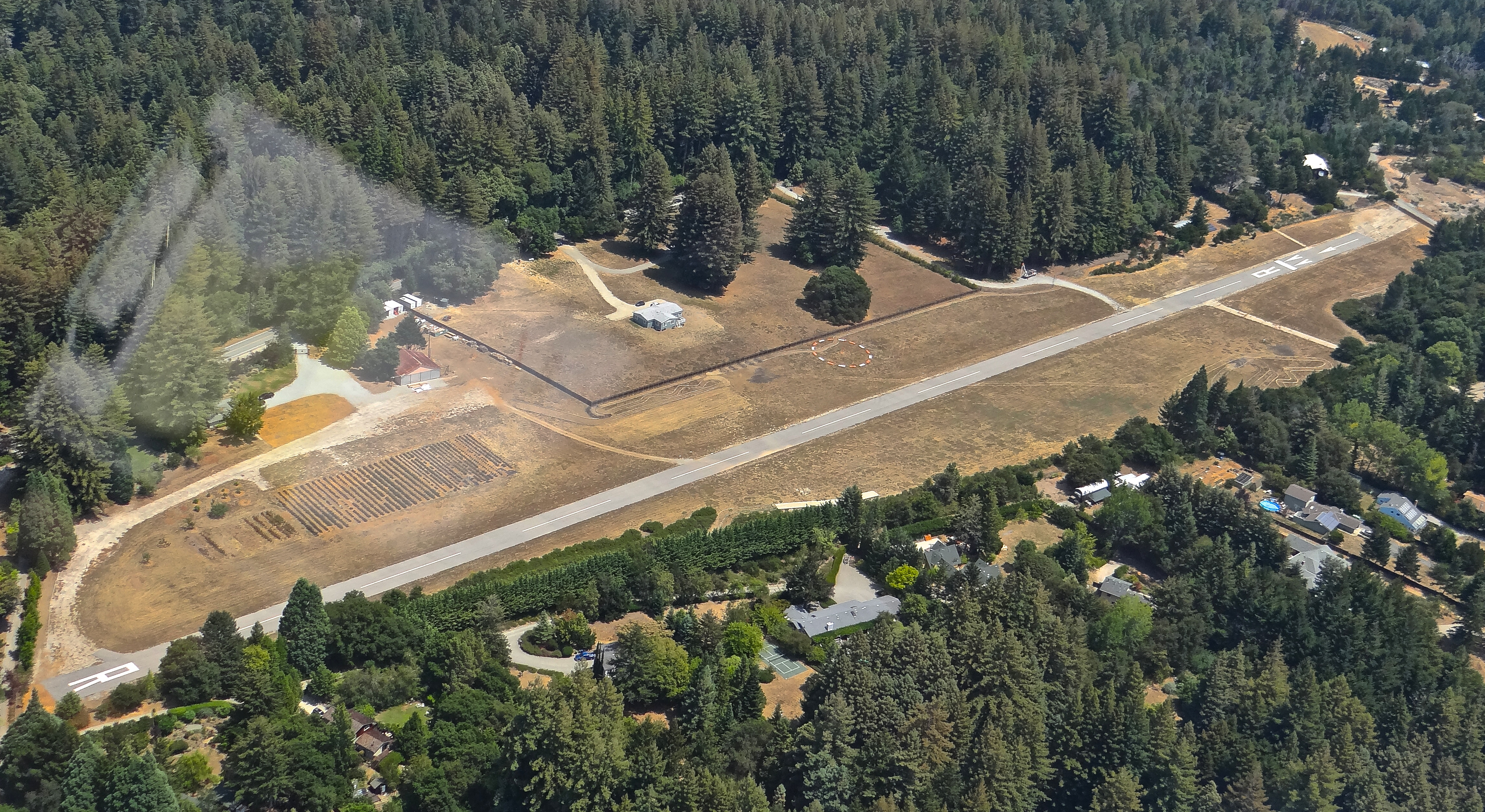
A view of Bonny Doon Village Airport from the western end. (7-19-15)
