= Lompico Sandstone =

Geologic formation in California, United States

The Lompico Sandstone is a sedimentary rock formation of lower to middle Miocene age. It overlies the Salinian basement rocks of Santa Cruz County, California. It interfingers with and is overlain by the Miocene Monterey Formation. These are in turn overlain by the mid to upper Miocene Santa Margarita Sandstone which is in turn overlain by the upper Miocene Santa Cruz Mudstone.

== Hydrological importance ==
There are numerous occurrences of this rock strata including coastal mountain ranges from Northern to Southern California. In the coastal range of Santa Cruz County the formation has been documented in the Zayante Creek watershed. The formation is often associated with groundwater recharge areas.

== See also ==
- Vaqueros sandstone
