= Bonny Doon, California =

- census-designated place
- Location of Bonny Doon in Santa Cruz County, California.

- Position in California.
- Coordinates: 37°02′37″N 122°08′13″W
- Country: United States
- State: California
- County: Santa Cruz

Area
  - Total: 16.56 sq mi (42.90 km^{2})
  - Land: 16.56 sq mi (42.90 km^{2})
  - Water: 0 sq mi (0.00 km^{2}) 0%
- Elevation: 1,476 ft (450 m)

Population (2020)
  - Total: 2,868
  - Density: 173.2/sq mi (66.86/km^{2})
- Time zone: UTC-8 (Pacific (PST))
  - Summer (DST): UTC-7 (PDT)
- ZIP Code: 95060
- GNIS feature ID: 2582948

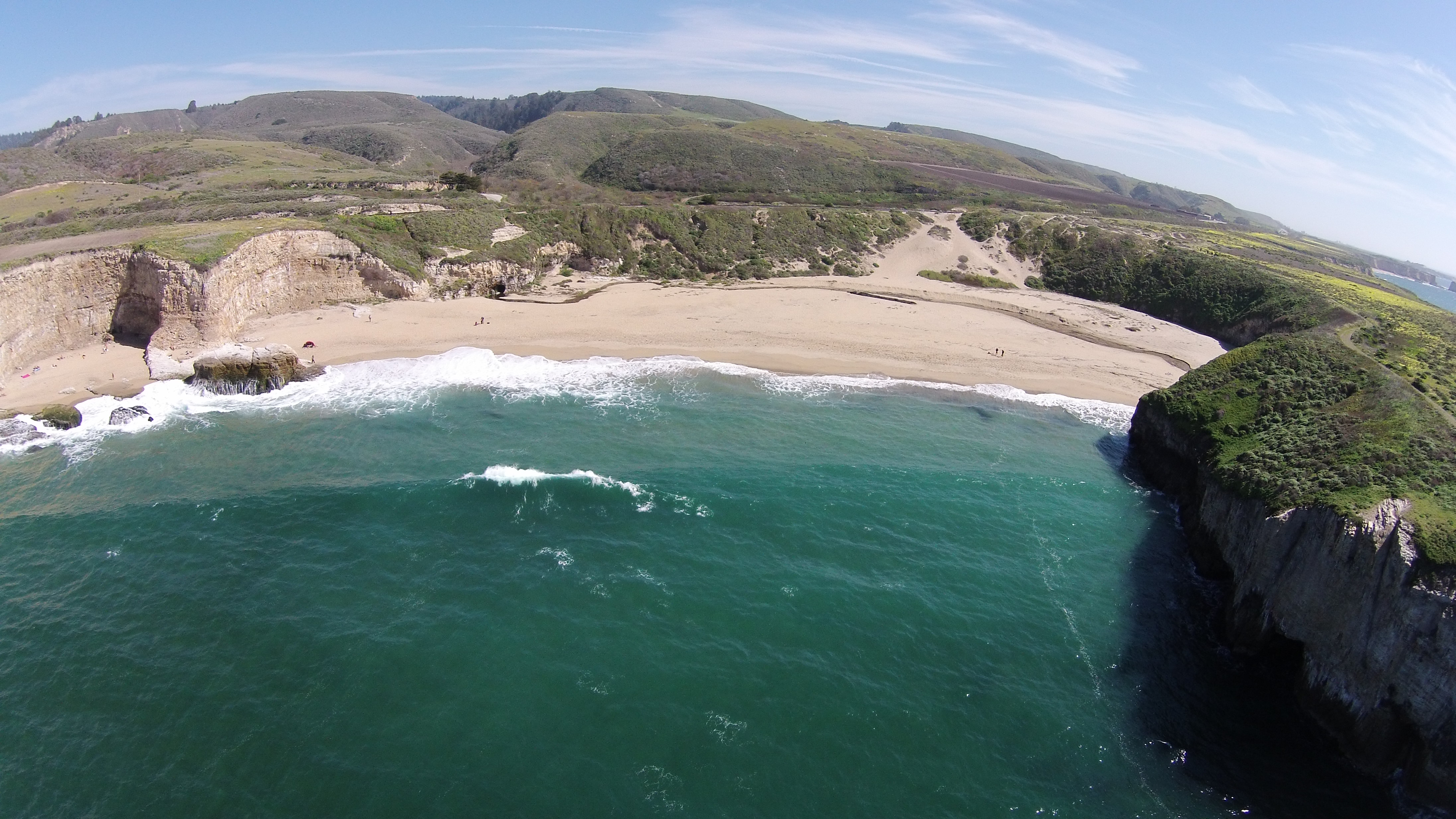
Aerial view of nearby Bonny Doon Beach

Bonny Doon is a census-designated place in Santa Cruz County, California, United States. It is situated northwest of the city of Santa Cruz and is considered part of the southern San Francisco Bay Area or northern Monterey Bay Area. Bonny Doon's population was 2,868, as reported by the 2020 census.

== History ==
It was founded in the 1850s as a logging camp. The current name can be attested back to 1902: John Burns, a Scotsman living in Santa Cruz, named Bonny Doon after a line in the Robert Burns song "The Banks O' Doon". The line is: "Ye banks and braes o' bonnie Doon...", and refers back to the Doon River in Scotland. Evidence of 2,600 years of occupation by Native Americans has been found in the area.

Bonny Doon has no city center or commercial shops, but features several wineries including Bonny Doon Vineyard, a church, two fire stations, a lavender farm, the Bonny Doon Ecological Reserve, an elementary school, and a private-use airport. A beach of the same name is nearby.

In 2020, Bonny Doon was popular with remote workers during the COVID-19 pandemic.

=== Wildfires ===
At 2:54 p.m. on June 11, 2008, a fire broke out at the Bonny Doon Ecological Reserve, a preserve with a number of hiking trails located on Martin Road. This Martin Fire burned 520 acres (2.1 km^{2}), destroying three residences and eight outbuildings. About 1,500 residents of Bonny Doon were evacuated as a result of the fire. Governor Arnold Schwarzenegger declared a state of emergency for Santa Cruz County. The blaze cost over $5.4 million to contain and was part of a busy summer of wildfires in California.

Little more than one year later, on August 12, 2009 at 7:16 pm, a second fire started in Bonny Doon, near the Lockheed facility off Empire Grade. The Lockheed Fire burned 7,817 acres (31.63 km^{2}), and destroyed 13 outbuildings. More than 2,000 residents were evacuated as the blaze spread from Swanton south toward Bonny Doon. The blaze cost over $26.6 million and took nearly 2 weeks to be fully contained. The cause of the fire remains under investigation.

In August 2020, Bonny Doon was affected by the CZU complex of lightning-initiated fires, which joined together to form one of the top 10 largest fires ever in California. Many home structures, the local school, and lavender field farm were protected by local residents – and one neighbor’s (borrowed) fire equipment truck. This band of neighbors defied an evacuation order and worked together over 4 days and nights to save multiple properties in their community, with the help of CAL Fire at the very peak of the fire.

== Geography ==
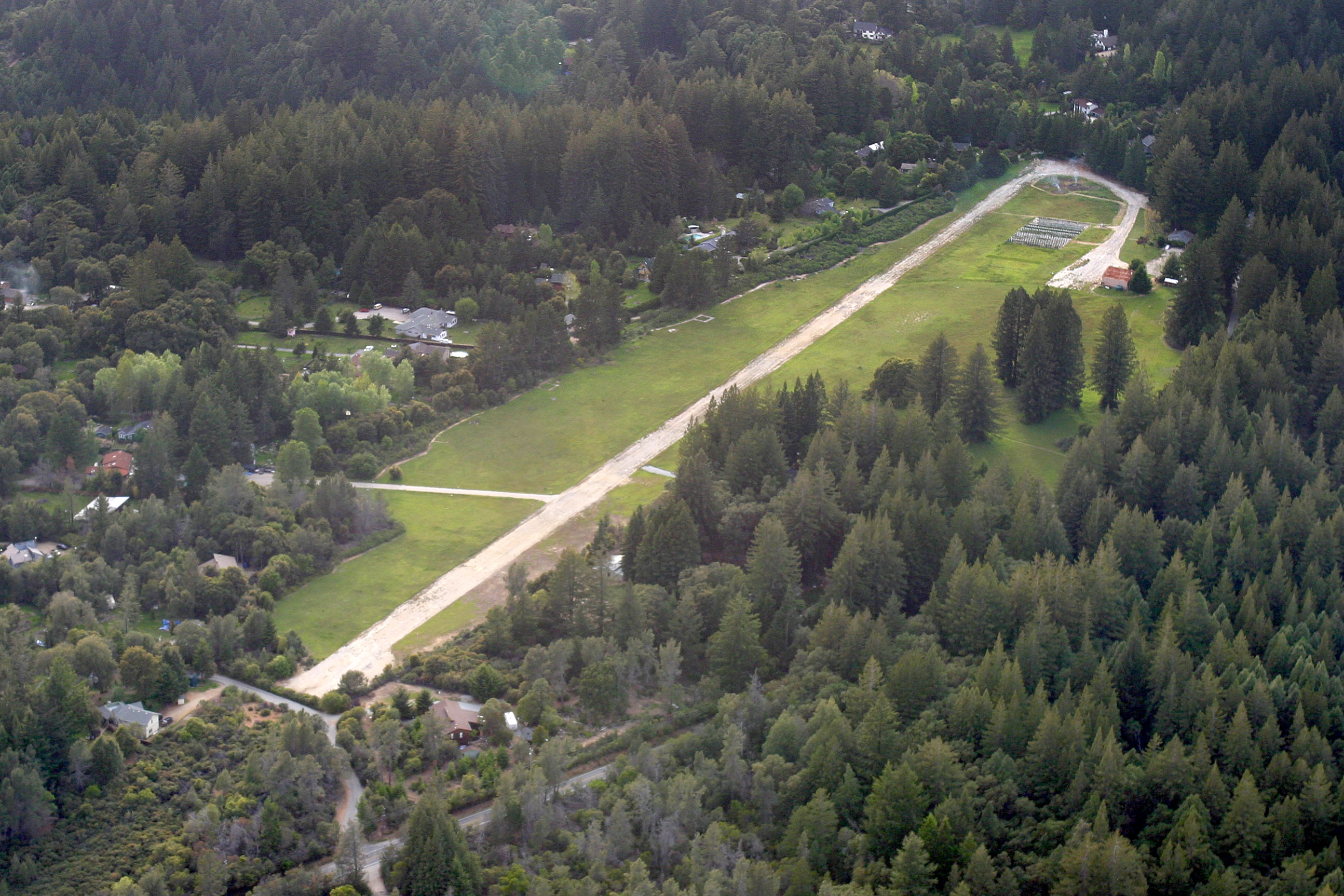
Bonny Doon Village Airport

According to the United States Census Bureau, the CDP covers an area of 16.7 square miles (43.2 km^{2}), all land. The area sits at an elevation of 1,476 feet (450 m).

The area is on a slope with higher elevations in redwood forest or maritime chaparral, and lower elevations descending into the coastal zone, which is occupied by grasslands. There are ocean views from parts of the area on days when fog is not present.

The road to Bonny Doon from State Route 1, named Bonny Doon Road, crosses an enclosed, unmarked conveyor belt, which carried limestone from a quarry 3 miles (4.8 km) east to the Cemex cement plant in Davenport. The Davenport plant had supplied cement for later stages of the Panama Canal and other large projects since its founding in 1906, but is now closed.

== Demographics ==
Historical population
Census	Pop.	Note	%±
2010	2,678		—
2020	2,868		7.1%
U.S. Decennial Census; 1860–1870 1880-1890; 1900 1910 1920; 1930 1940 1950; 1960 1970 1980; 1990 2000 2010; 2020

Bonny Doon first appeared as a census designated place in the 2010 U.S. census.

=== Racial and ethnic composition ===
Bonny Doon CDP, California – Racial and ethnic composition Note: the US Census treats Hispanic/Latino as an ethnic category. This table excludes Latinos from the racial categories and assigns them to a separate category. Hispanics/Latinos may be of any race.
Race / Ethnicity (NH = Non-Hispanic)	Pop 2010	Pop 2020	% 2010	% 2020
White alone (NH)	2,366	2,290	88.35%	79.85%
Black or African American alone (NH)	9	15	0.34%	0.52%
Native American or Alaska Native alone (NH)	9	9	0.34%	0.31%
Asian alone (NH)	50	66	1.87%	2.30%
Native Hawaiian or Pacific Islander alone (NH)	4	4	0.15%	0.14%
Other race alone (NH)	11	17	0.41%	0.59%
Mixed race or Multiracial (NH)	61	184	2.28%	6.42%
Hispanic or Latino (any race)	168	283	6.27%	9.87%
Total	2,678	2,868	100.00%	100.00%

=== 2020 census ===
As of the 2020 census, Bonny Doon had a population of 2,868. The population density was 173.2 inhabitants per square mile (66.9/km^{2}).

The age distribution was 16.9% under the age of 18, 5.8% aged 18 to 24, 23.8% aged 25 to 44, 27.2% aged 45 to 64, and 26.4% who were 65 years of age or older. The median age was 48.2 years. For every 100 females, there were 106.5 males, and for every 100 females age 18 and over, there were 109.3 males age 18 and over.

The census reported that 98.0% of the population lived in households, 1.6% lived in non-institutionalized group quarters, and 0.4% were institutionalized. 0.0% of residents lived in urban areas, while 100.0% lived in rural areas.

There were 1,083 households, out of which 25.4% included children under the age of 18, 55.3% were married-couple households, 8.1% were cohabiting couple households, 17.6% had a female householder with no partner present, and 18.9% had a male householder with no partner present. 21.2% of households were one person, and 11.1% were one person aged 65 or older. The average household size was 2.60. There were 735 families (67.9% of all households).

There were 1,171 housing units at an average density of 70.7 units per square mile (27.3 units/km^{2}), of which 1,083 (92.5%) were occupied. Of these, 76.3% were owner-occupied, and 23.7% were occupied by renters. Of all housing units, 7.5% were vacant. The homeowner vacancy rate was 0.1%, and the rental vacancy rate was 1.9%.

=== Income and poverty ===
In 2023, the US Census Bureau estimated that the median household income was $163,125, and the per capita income was $58,869. About 6.7% of families and 9.9% of the population were below the poverty line.

== Government ==
In the California State Legislature, Bonny Doon is in the 17th senatorial district, represented by Democrat John Laird, and in the 28th Assembly district, represented by Democrat Gail Pellerin.

In the United States House of Representatives, Bonny Doon is in California's 19th congressional district, represented by Democrat Jimmy Panetta.

== Infrastructure ==
Internet and television service are available but mobile phone service is very limited due to the mountainous terrain and trees.

== Notable people ==
Robert A. Heinlein (1907–1988), a noted science fiction author, and his wife Virginia, resided in Bonny Doon from 1965 until just before his death. They designed and built the house themselves.

Bonny Doon was briefly in the spotlight in 2009 when model Jasmine Fiore was murdered. Jasmine grew up in Bonny Doon and attended the local elementary, where she was known as Jasmine Lepore.
