= Lompico Creek =

- Location of the mouth of Lompico Creek in California

Location
- Country: United States
- State: California
- Counties: Santa Cruz

Physical characteristics
- Source: Santa Cruz Mountains
  - location: Castle Rock Ridge
  - coordinates: 37°08′12″N 122°02′09″W
- Mouth: Zayante Creek
  - location: Felton
  - coordinates: 37°04′55″N 122°03′03″W
  - elevation: 351 ft (107 m)

Lompico Creek is a tributary of Zayante Creek in Santa Cruz County, California, United States. The placename of Meehan is associated with a location near the mouth of Lompico Creek as it discharges to Zayante Creek. The geology of this watershed including the mainstem watershed of Zayante Creek is characterized by strata that include Vaqueros Sandstone and Lompico Sandstone.
