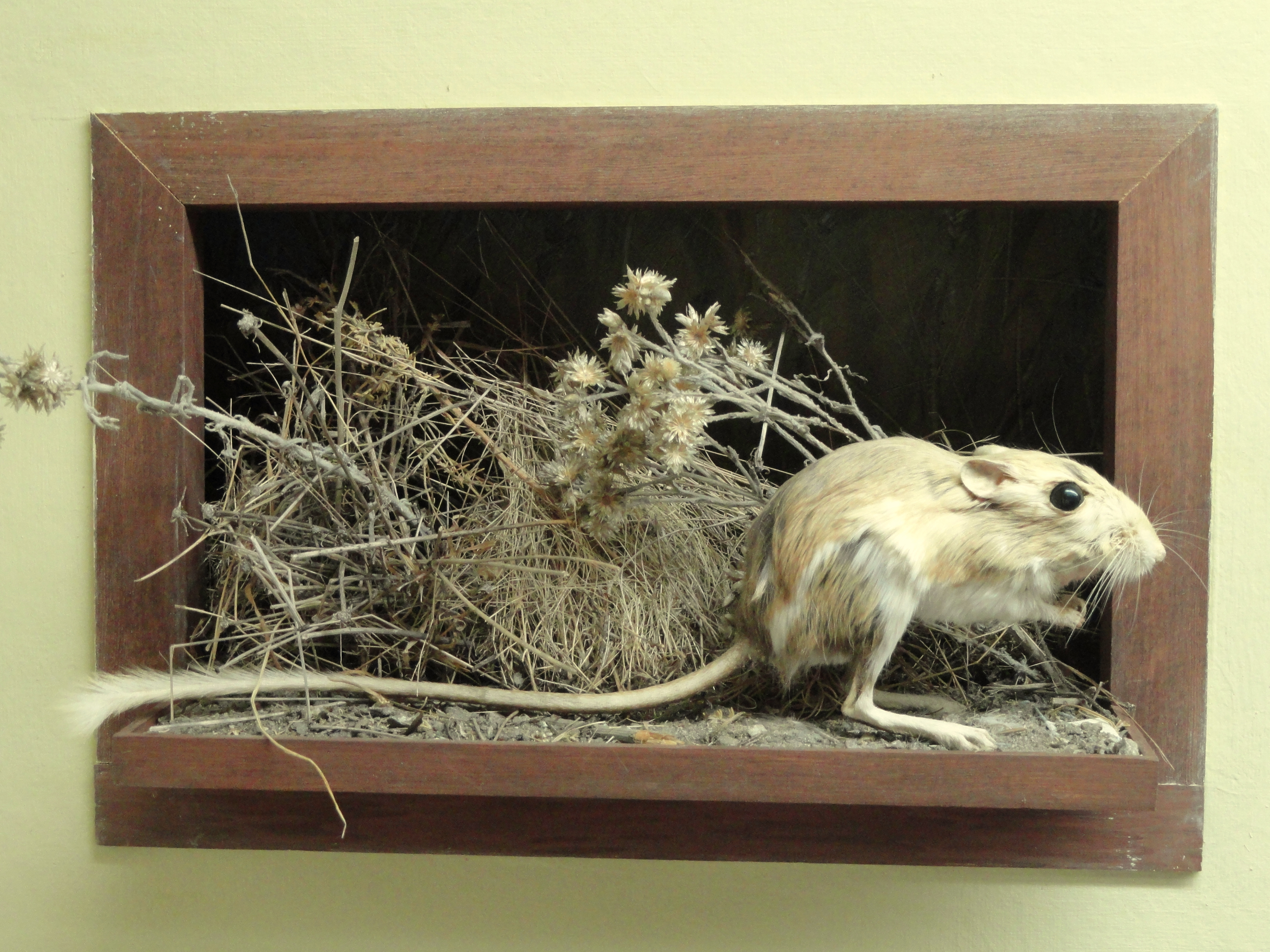

Conservation status
- Least Concern (IUCN 3.1)

Scientific classification
- Kingdom: Animalia
- Phylum: Chordata
- Class: Mammalia
- Order: Rodentia
- Family: Heteromyidae
- Genus: Dipodomys
- Species: D. venustus

Binomial name
- Dipodomys venustus (Merriam, 1904)

= Narrow-faced kangaroo rat =

Species of rodent

The narrow-faced kangaroo rat (Dipodomys venustus) is one of almost 20 species of kangaroo rats, a rodent in the family Heteromyidae. It is endemic to California in the United States.

Like all other heteromyids, the dental formula of Dipodomys venustus is 1.0.1.31.0.1.3 × 2 = 20.

Narrow-faced kangaroo rats lives within chaparral, mixed chaparral, and on sandy soils with oak or pine. They are distributed along West-central California in the coastal mountains. They have been divided into three subspecies:

- Dipodomys venustus venustus (Santa Cruz kangaroo rat), which inhabit the Santa Cruz Mountains and Mount Hamilton range, the latter a central sub-range of the Diablo Range
- Dipodomys venustus elephantinus (Elephant-eared or big-eared kangaroo rat), which inhabit the Gabilan Range and southern Diablo Range
- Dipodomys venustus sanctiluciae (Santa Lucia kangaroo rat); which inhabit the Santa Lucia Range
