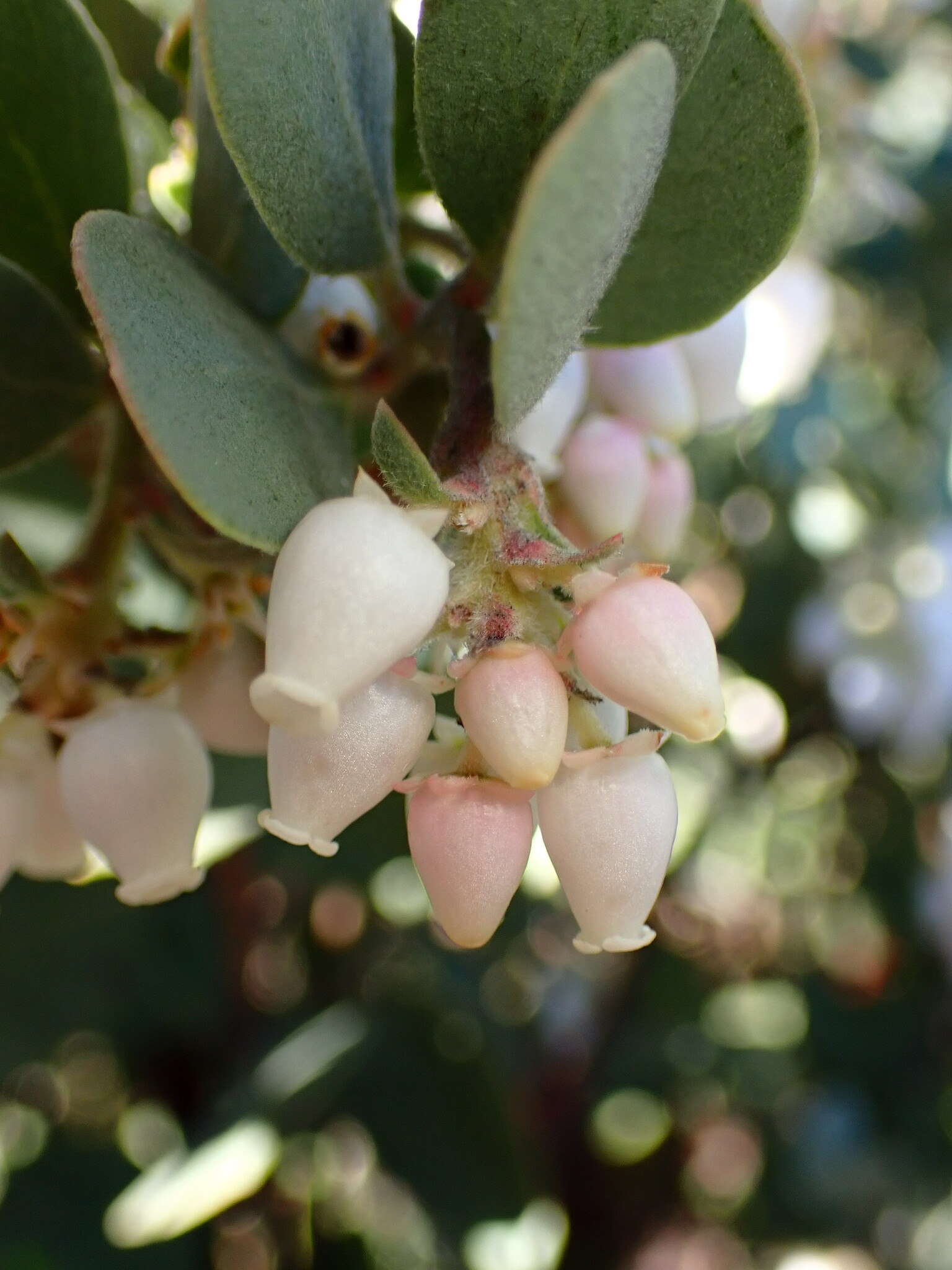

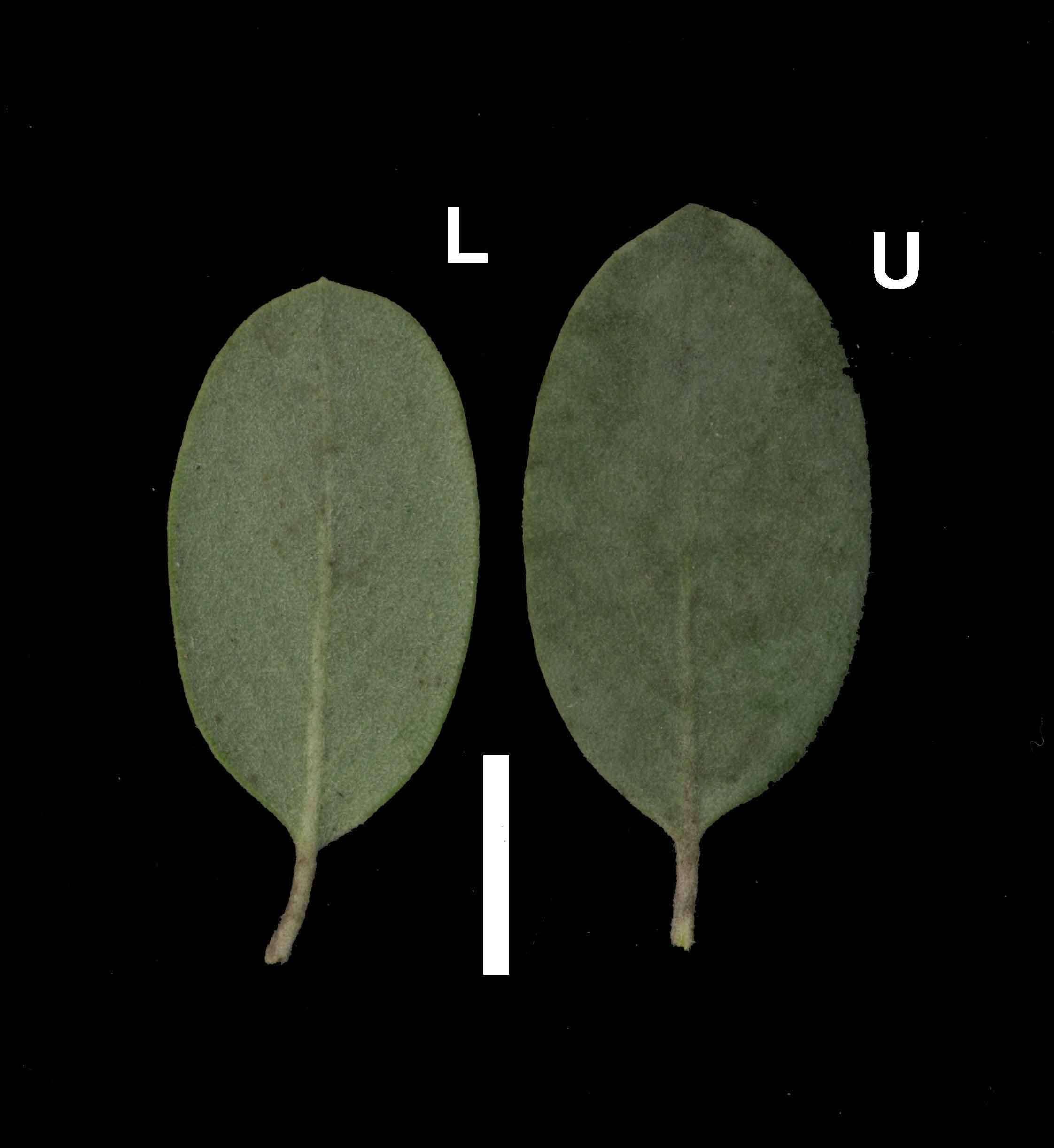

Conservation status
- Critically Imperiled (NatureServe)

Scientific classification
- Kingdom: Plantae
- Clade: Tracheophytes
- Clade: Angiosperms
- Clade: Eudicots
- Clade: Asterids
- Order: Ericales
- Family: Ericaceae
- Genus: Arctostaphylos
- Species: A. silvicola

Binomial name
- Arctostaphylos silvicola Jeps. & Wiesl.

= Arctostaphylos silvicola =

Bonny Doon manzanita

Species of flowering plant

Arctostaphylos silvicola is a species of manzanita known by the common names Bonny Doon or silverleaf manzanita. It is endemic to the sandhills of the southern Santa Cruz Mountains in California's Santa Cruz and Santa Clara counties.

== Description ==
This is a large shrub growing at least a meter tall and known to exceed six meters in height, looking much like a tree. The bark is dark red and smooth. The leaves are greenish gray in color and sometimes slightly woolly. They are oval in shape and up to 3.5 centimeters long. The shrub flowers in inflorescences of long, urn-shaped manzanita flowers and produces drupes 6 to 12 millimeters wide.

== Habitat ==
Arctostaphylos silvicola grows in coniferous forest and chaparral on inland marine sands.

== Conservation status ==
Silverleaf is listed as "fairly endangered" by the California Native Plant Society. The main threats to the species are habitat loss through sand mining and development. A portion of the habitat is protected by the Bonny Doon Ecological Reserve.
