= Maritime coast range ponderosa pine forest =

Coordinates: 37.0670°N 122.0535°W

The maritime coast range ponderosa pine forests, also known as ponderosa sand parklands and ponderosa pine sandhills, are a rare temperate forest community consisting of open stands of a disjunct population of ponderosa pine growing on sandy soils in the Santa Cruz Mountains of north central coastal California. Limited to approximately 200 acres (81 ha), the only two known occurrences of this type are near the towns of Ben Lomond and Bonny Doon in Santa Cruz County.

== Description ==
This forest type is restricted to very sandy Zayante soils that are isolated pockets of decomposing sandstone from the Miocene terraces of the coastal range, distinct from the volcanically formed rocks which make up most of the Santa Cruz Range. These soils are deemed to be relicts of once larger expanses found when this region was geologically even younger, and hence had more evidence of the sandstone erosion of the ancient uplifted ocean floor. Estimated to originally cover 6,000 acres (2,400 ha), 40% of this type has been lost, mostly to sand quarrying and development.

The forests occur on less than 200 acres (81 ha), consisting of open stands of Ponderosa Pine with occasional Knobcone Pine and Santa Cruz Cypress.

Fire historically played an important role in this habitat.

One of these three forests is located atop a ridge that straddles the Carbonera Creek and Zayante Creek watersheds of Santa Cruz County within the western slopes of the Santa Cruz Mountains.

The forests are home to three endemic insects and four endemic plants.

== See also ==
- Ponderosa pine forest
- Bonny Doon Ecological Reserve
- Henry Cowell Redwoods State Park
- High conservation value forest
- Endangered arthropod
