= Mount Hermon, California =

Unincorporated community in California, United States

Mount Hermon
- Census-designated place & unincorporated community
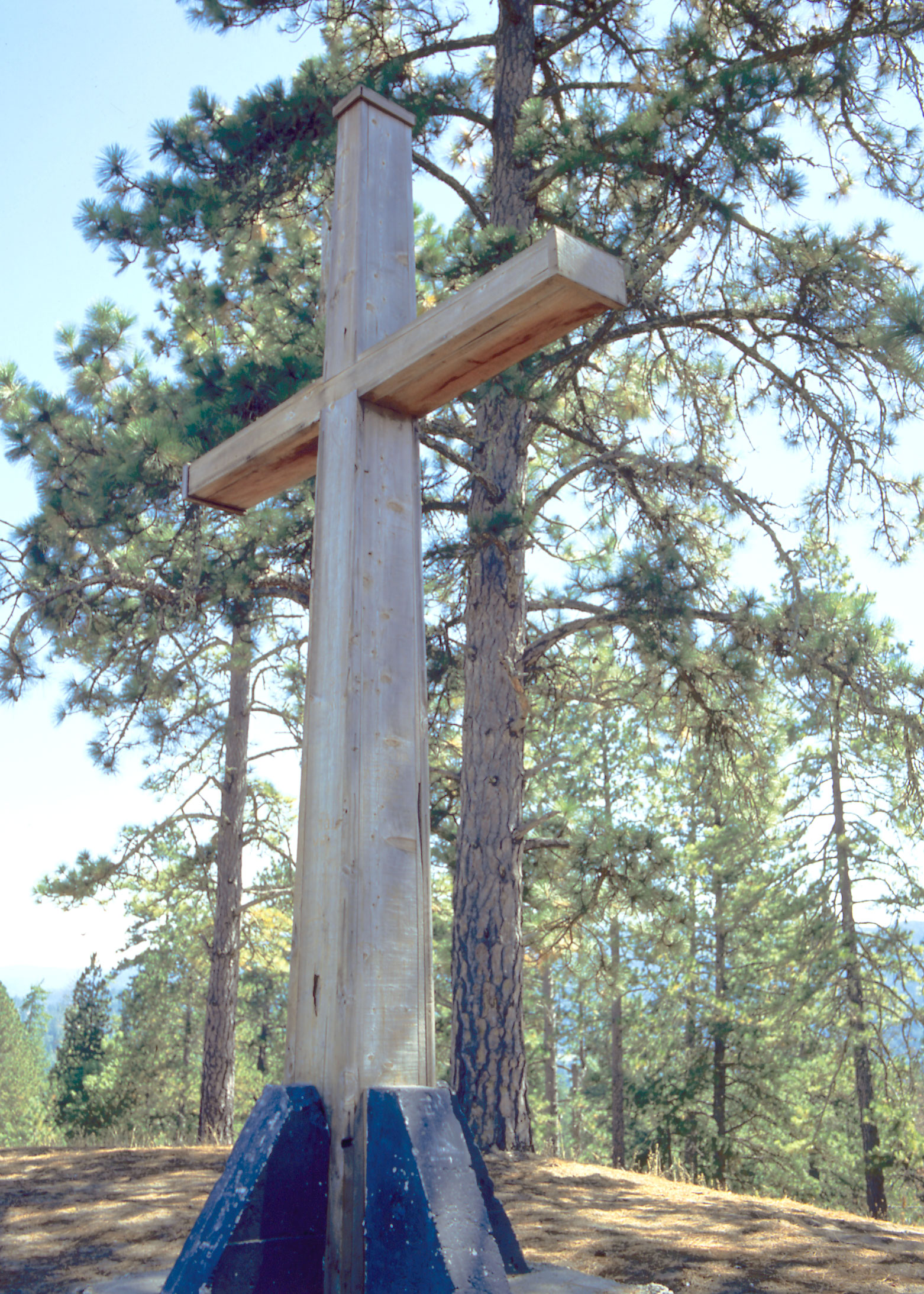
- Cross on the summit of Mount Hermon

- Location within California
- Coordinates: 37°3′4″N 122°3′27″W
- Country: United States
- State: California
- County: Santa Cruz

Area
  - Total: 0.650 sq mi (1.684 km^{2})
  - Land: 0.650 sq mi (1.684 km^{2})
  - Water: 0 sq mi (0 km^{2}) 0%
- Elevation: 584 ft (178 m)

Population (2020)
  - Total: 1,110
  - Density: 1,710/sq mi (659/km^{2})
- ZIP code: 95041
- Area code: 831

Mount Hermon is an unincorporated community and census-designated place (CDP) in Santa Cruz County, California, United States. As of the 2020 census, Mount Hermon had a population of 1,110.

== History ==
In 1841, California's first water-powered sawmill was built at the junction of Bean Creek and Zayante Creek by Peter Lassen, Isaac Graham, J. Majors, and F. Hoeger.

Mount Hermon, known as "Tuxedo Junction" prior to 1906, was a stop on the South Coast Pacific Railroad from Alameda to Santa Cruz. Hotel Tuxedo was on the property; the hotel was purchased and renamed the Zayante Inn on April 14, 1906, by a group which later became the Mount Hermon Association, Inc. Five ladies of the group were entrusted with the selection of a new name for the area, and they chose that of the peak in the Holy Land. The land was to be used as a Christian retreat center, whose dedication day, known as "The Great Day", was July 22, 1906; the event was held at the Zayante Inn with 1400 people in attendance. Speaking at the dedication was Dr. Reuben A. Torrey, President of the Moody Bible Institute in Chicago, Illinois.

The Zayante Inn and surrounding cottages were destroyed by fire on April 18, 1921. At the site, the Mount Hermon Christian Conference Center, with three separate facilities, operates on much of the original property. There are also several hundred privately owned homes, the Mount Hermon post office, and a bookstore.

== Geography ==
According to the United States Census Bureau, the CDP covers an area of 0.65 square miles (1.7 km^{2}), all land.

== Demographics ==
Historical population
Census	Pop.	Note	%±
2010	1,037		—
2020	1,110		7.0%
U.S. Decennial Census; 1860–1870 1880-1890; 1900 1910 1920; 1930 1940 1950; 1960 1970 1980; 1990 2000 2010; 2020

Mount Hermon first appeared as a census-designated place in the 2010 United States census.

=== Racial and ethnic composition ===
Mount Hermon CDP, California – Racial and ethnic composition Note: the US Census treats Hispanic/Latino as an ethnic category. This table excludes Latinos from the racial categories and assigns them to a separate category. Hispanics/Latinos may be of any race.
Race / Ethnicity (NH = Non-Hispanic)	Pop 2010	Pop 2020	% 2010	% 2020
White alone (NH)	908	870	87.56%	78.38%
Black or African American alone (NH)	6	8	0.58%	0.72%
Native American or Alaska Native alone (NH)	2	2	0.19%	0.18%
Asian alone (NH)	13	18	1.25%	1.62%
Native Hawaiian or Pacific Islander alone (NH)	1	0	0.10%	0.00%
Other race alone (NH)	0	3	0.00%	0.27%
Mixed race or Multiracial (NH)	24	80	2.31%	7.21%
Hispanic or Latino (any race)	83	129	8.00%	11.62%
Total	1,037	1,110	100.00%	100.00%

=== 2020 census ===
As of the 2020 census, Mount Hermon had a population of 1,110. The population density was 1,707.7 inhabitants per square mile (659.3/km^{2}). The racial makeup of Mount Hermon was 917 (82.6%) White, 8 (0.7%) African American, 2 (0.2%) Native American, 18 (1.6%) Asian, 0 (0.0%) Pacific Islander, 26 (2.3%) from other races, and 139 (12.5%) from two or more races. Hispanic or Latino of any race were 129 persons (11.6%).

98.0% of residents lived in urban areas, while 2.0% lived in rural areas.

The whole population lived in households. There were 422 households, out of which 118 (28.0%) had children under the age of 18 living in them, 234 (55.5%) were married-couple households, 25 (5.9%) were cohabiting couple households, 101 (23.9%) had a female householder with no partner present, and 62 (14.7%) had a male householder with no partner present. 119 households (28.2%) were one person, and 48 (11.4%) were one person aged 65 or older. The average household size was 2.63. There were 266 families (63.0% of all households).

The age distribution was 208 people (18.7%) under the age of 18, 84 people (7.6%) aged 18 to 24, 352 people (31.7%) aged 25 to 44, 269 people (24.2%) aged 45 to 64, and 197 people (17.7%) who were 65 years of age or older. The median age was 39.0 years. For every 100 females, there were 93.0 males. For every 100 females age 18 and over, there were 87.5 males age 18 and over.

There were 523 housing units at an average density of 804.6 units per square mile (310.7 units/km^{2}), of which 422 (80.7%) were occupied and 101 (19.3%) were vacant. Of these, 246 (58.3%) were owner-occupied, and 176 (41.7%) were occupied by renters. The homeowner vacancy rate was 0.0%, and the rental vacancy rate was 5.2%.

== Notable people ==
- Jordan Beck, NFL football player
- Joy Williams, singer – moved here with her family in 1993 when her father became CEO of Mount Hermon Christian Camps and Conference Center
