= Erysimum teretifolium =

Conservation status
- Critically Imperiled (NatureServe)

- Endangered (ESA)

Scientific classification
- Kingdom: Plantae
- Clade: Tracheophytes
- Clade: Angiosperms
- Clade: Eudicots
- Clade: Rosids
- Order: Brassicales
- Family: Brassicaceae
- Genus: Erysimum
- Species: E. teretifolium

Binomial name
- Erysimum teretifolium Eastw.

Species of flowering plant

Erysimum teretifolium is a species of Erysimum known by the common names Santa Cruz wallflower and Ben Lomond wallflower. It is a very rare plant endemic to Santa Cruz County, California, where it grows on inland sand spits, chaparral, and sandstone deposits in the southern Santa Cruz Mountains. It is a California state and federally listed endangered species.

This plant is a biennial or perennial herb with one or more unbranched erect dark reddish-purple stems reaching anywhere from 15 centimetres (5.9 in) to nearly 1 metre (39 in) in height. There are a few straight, somewhat toothed, dark greenish leaves along the stems. At the tops of the stems are thin clusters of flowers with rounded bright to dark yellow or orangish petals, each 1–2 centimetres (0.39–0.79 in) long. The flowers drop to leave long, flat fruits which are siliques up to 15 centimetres (5.9 in) long, sticking out from the stem.

== Reproductive biology ==
This species of plant is self-incompatible, meaning an individual is not capable of self-fertilization or autogamy, when both gametes come from the same individual. Instead, it must rely on cross-fertilization, one gamete from another individual, to produce seeds. According to research from The American Journal of Botany, it is clear that this species is likely to have high pollinator visitation rates, which could be responsible for the biological fitness of the species despite limitations of self-incompatibility. Population genetics studies have shown that most of this species genetic variation is found within populations rather than between them, this can be an indication of an outcrossing mating system and gene flow. The maintenance of genetic diversity within a population is considered to be crucial to the survival of this narrowly endemic species.

== Distribution and habitat ==
This species is found only within a strip of land measuring 9 by 5 miles (14.5 km × 8.0 km). Or the Zayante sandhills of Santa Cruz County, California. This is a rare dune environment found inland, characterized by deep sandy soils high in quartz content and generally open with vegetation. The sand hills have a variety of endemic species, like Chorizanthe pungens var. hartwegian, and Hesperocyparis abramsiana var. abramsiana, and are considered to be an area of conservation concern. The plant is mainly threatened by coastal and inland development in the area and mining of the sand it lives in. About 75% of the remaining plants grow on land belonging to a sand mining company. Fire suppression has also altered the habitat to the detriment of the plant; leaf and needle litter builds up while the plant requires stretches of open sand. Urban development is another threat, destroying habitat and leading to habitat fragmentation.

There are about 13 known extant populations. Several others are believed to have been extirpated. Habitat that has been damaged by sand mining operations will likely never be restored to its natural condition.
