= Zayante Creek =

- Location of the mouth of Zayante Creek in California
- Native name: Sayant (Awaswas language)

Location
- Country: United States
- State: California
- County: Santa Cruz

Physical characteristics
- Source: Santa Cruz Mountains
  - location: Castle Rock Ridge
  - coordinates: 37°9′21.81″N 122°0′4.85″W
  - elevation: 1,000 ft (300 m)
- Mouth: San Lorenzo River
  - location: Felton
  - coordinates: 37°2′52.82″N 122°4′4.87″W
  - elevation: 233 ft (71 m)
- Length: 10.3 mi (16.6 km)

Basin features
- River system: San Lorenzo River
- Tributaries
  - left: Mountain Charlie Gulch, Bean Creek
  - right: Lompico Creek

Zayante Creek (Ohlone: Sayant) is a 10.3-mile-long (16.6 km) stream within the San Lorenzo River watershed in Santa Cruz County, California, United States. The U.S. government has designated Zayante Creek as impaired with respect to sediment. Lompico Creek, a tributary of Zayante Creek, is listed for impairment by pathogens. In the period 1998 to 2000 a restoration project was conducted for this stream to improve anadromous fish passage, rearing and spawning. There has been a permanent U.S. Geological Survey gauging station on Zayante Creek which has operated since the year 1959; the mean altitude of the Zayante Basin, carved within the western slopes of the Santa Cruz Mountains, is 1,000 feet (300 m). Significant tributaries to Zayante Creek are Lompico Creek and Bean Creek.

== Geology ==
Soils formations along the mainstem of Zayante Creek by ascending altitude are: Monterey Formation, Zayante Formation, Vaqueros Sandstone and Lompico Sandstone; about midway through its course, Zayante Creek is bisected by the Zayante Fault.

== Ecology ==
Several notable ecological features are present in the Zayante Creek watershed, including the occurrence of a rare forest type: maritime coast range ponderosa pine forest, which contains two endangered arthropods. Regarding specific avafauna species there are sightings of Townsend's warbler.

== See also ==
- List of rivers in California
