= Surf City USA =

Trademark dispute

Locations of the two California cities claiming to be "Surf City"

The registration of the "Surf City USA" trademark inflamed a historical dispute between the California coastal cities of Huntington Beach and Santa Cruz. Both cities claimed the "Surf City" nickname, but after the Huntington Beach Conference and Visitors Bureau (now Visit Huntington Beach) filed three trademark applications for "Surf City USA" with the U.S. Patent and Trademark Office in 2004, a new conflict erupted, a controversy Surfer dubbed "Moniker-gate." The resulting publicity generated the equivalent of several million dollars in advertising with thousands of stories and news reports broadcast across the globe. A lawsuit was eventually settled in January 2008 which validated Huntington Beach's exclusive rights to the trademark.

== Background ==
The cities of Huntington Beach and Santa Cruz both claimed to be "Surf City," based on their respective surfing cultures.

Santa Cruz was the site of first recorded surfing in California, by Hawaiians. It is home to the Santa Cruz Surfing Museum and 11 surf breaks, such as Steamer Lane, which create some of the best surfing waves in the world. Santa Cruz is also the site of the O'Neill Cold Water Classic and other international surfing contests.

Huntington Beach hosts one of the most important surfing events in the world, the U.S. Open of Surfing, as well as the International Surfing Museum, Surfing Walk of Fame, Surfers' Hall of Fame and more than 50 surfing events each year. It offers ten miles of wide open sandy beach with a consistent surf break, and Huntington Beach Pier, known for its waves and crowds that gather to watch surfers. In addition, the American rock duo Jan and Dean had Huntington Beach in mind, not Santa Cruz, when they recorded "Surf City," the first surf song to reach number one on the Billboard charts. "'It was the surf media which first dubbed this place Surf City," Dean Torrence told the Christian Science Monitor. "I can say for sure it wasn't Santa Cruz.'"

Santa Cruz began using the "Surf City" nickname in 1927 after a local newspaper coined the moniker. Torrence successfully lobbied Huntington Beach City Council to officially adopt the "Surf City" nickname in 1991. A Huntington Beach assemblyman introduced a state resolution to recognize "Surf City Huntington Beach" in 1992, but Santa Cruz fought the initiative and it failed. Huntington Beach applied for a "Surf City Huntington Beach" trademark, which was approved and placed on the Principal Register in 1994.

== Development and Registration of the trademark ==
An effort to formally evaluate the best way to market Huntington Beach began during a workshop organized by Huntington Beach Convention and Visitors Bureau President Doug Traub on July 20, 2004. The goal was to gain a consensus for how to brand the community as the most desirable beach city on the West Coast. Six potential branding positions were tested over an 18-month period. The research revealed that Southern California beach and surfing culture offered the most commercial potential. The ideal brand was best expressed by the term "Surf City".

The challenge was that Surf City was in the public domain. "Geographic terms or signs are not registrable as trademarks if they are geographically descriptive," according to the U.S. Patent & Trademark Office. Traub added "USA" to "create a brand position that could clearly be associated with a lifestyle and state of mind rather than a song or place on the map." During early November 2005, he used the Surf City USA trademark for the first time in advertising, and printed on brochures, t-shirts and sports bags. A brand new surfcityusa.com website was also launched in a "startlingly different manner," with the "Surf City" song briefly played on a visit to the homepage.

When the first three trademark applications were submitted later that month, the story was picked up the Associated Press and distributed to hundreds of newspapers and broadcasters. The introductory Surf City USA campaign was off and running with Dean Torrence as an official brand spokesperson. With only a few months of usage, however, the U.S. Patent and Trademark rejected the initial attempt to secure trademarks on the Primary Register. Surf City USA was deemed "geographically descriptive," so they were entered on the Supplemental Register. To get them on the Primary Register would be a "difficult task," requiring the Bureau to use Surf City USA over a period of years and then to prove Surf City USA had acquired "secondary meaning" or "distinctiveness."

By the time trademarks were entered on the Supplemental Register in May 2006, press attention had skyrocketed due to interference from Santa Cruz. The controversy made front page in The Wall Street Journal. Traub announced seven more trademark applications. He planned a family of Surf City USA product licensees that would operate like a franchise family, producing revenue to promote the city. One of the first products developed was the Surf City USA Beach Cruiser by Felt Bicycles. By April 2008, Traub signed six licensing deals for credit union services, sportswear, and merchandise including t-shirts and key chains. In May, the Pacific Shoreline Marathon changed its name to Surf City USA Marathon.

Publicity generated during the launch of the Surf City USA brand created the equivalent of several million dollars in free advertising support, with thousands of stories and news reports appearing across the globe. "The decades-old rivalry made good fodder for radio and television shows. Today, the name "Surf City USA" resides securely in Huntington Beach," notes the book, Destination Branding for Small Cities. Former Huntington Beach Mayor Shirley Detloff, the Bureau's chairwoman at the time, noted, "We are officially Surf City USA because of Doug." The success of the branding effort was acknowledged by The New York Times on July 16, 2009.

The trademarks were placed on the Primary Register in February 2009. Visit Huntington Beach retains four Surf City USA trademarks on the Primary Register for advertising, economic development and retail stores; print marketing; surf music, mouse pads and magnets; and toy cars. A new Principal Register trademark for real estate services was approved for publication by the U.S. Patent & Trademark Office on February 6, 2024.

== Response and settlement ==
In response to complaints about the trademark in late 2004, Santa Cruz politicians claimed they would file their own trademark for "Original Surf City USA". The Mayor, Mike Rotkin, went on local television singing his own version of Jan and Dean's "Surf City" to protest. "Let’s have a contest bring your sticks, but leave your lawyers with their trademark tricks," he sang. In response, Torrence said that when they wrote Surf City, "none of us had Santa Cruz in mind ...I'm flattered that [Santa Cruz] is so uptight about it." Rotkin also proposed a surf-off with the trademark as the prize.

The next challenge came in August 2005 when Senator Joe Simitian, representing Santa Cruz, introduced a resolution to designate his city as "Surf City USA" to thwart Huntington Beach's trademark applications. '"There was an informal truce reached that both cities could use the name," he said, referring to the last time the issue came before the Legislature in 1992. "But that was ripped asunder when the (Huntington Beach) Conference and Visitors Bureau asked to patent nine separate trademarks."' Following in-person lobbying in Sacramento from Traub and Huntington Beach Mayor Jill Hardy, and a request from Huntington Beach Assemblyman Tom Harmon to table the bill, the resolution was withdrawn.

Almost a year later, legal counsel discovered a merchant in Santa Cruz selling t-shirts printed with Surf City USA. The Bureau sent a cease and desist letter to Noland's on the Wharf and Shoreline Surf Shop on September 7, 2006. In follow up phone calls, the Noland's were asked to stop selling the offending shirts and to donate the profits they had made to charity. In early October, Traub learned from reporters that the merchants hired a Silicon Valley intellectual property law firm, Townsend and Townsend and Crew, who had successfully challenged Microsoft in court. They planned to file a lawsuit to remove the Surf City USA trademark from the Supplemental Register.

The Bureau, represented by Gordon & Rees in San Diego, moved the lawsuit from a state court in Santa Cruz to federal court in San Jose. "Justice shouldn’t depend on a race to the courthouse or ‘hometowning’ Huntington Beach before a hostile local jury," said attorney Rich Sybert. The Bureau then filed a counterclaim against the merchants asking the court to declare the merchants had infringed on the trademark. Subsequent attempts to move the trial south from San Francisco failed. Attempts to dismiss the lawsuit were also unsuccessful. The parties agreed upon a confidential settlement in January 2008. Neither side admitted liability and all claims and counterclaims were dismissed.

== Aftermath ==
In April 2009, Surfer magazine proclaimed Santa Cruz the number one surf town considering "Best Places in the U.S. to Eat, Sleep, Work and Shred." The article went on to note, "Huntington Beach may have won the right to the name in the California courts, but any surfer who's ever paddled out at Steamer Lane knows the judge got it wrong." Of course, a judge had nothing to do with it. The matter was settled before a federal jury could rule on it.

Surfer Today offered a different perspective. "Looking back in history, one of life’s many ironies may be that officials from a small college town in northern California unwittingly helped to make the official brand of Huntington Beach a huge success almost the day it was launched. The irreverent and defiant response from Santa Cruz officials helped to give the Surf City USA brand public awareness and equity that normally would have taken years to cultivate."

On May 26, 2023, California Assemblyman Tri Ta introduced Assembly Concurrent Resolution 87, designating the I-405–Highway 39 (Beach Boulevard) interchange in Huntington Beach as the 'Surf City USA' interchange. The California State Assembly passed it by a margin of 80 to 15. Funds to erect the signs at the interchange would have to be donated from non-state sources.

== Gallery ==
Scenes in Huntington Beach
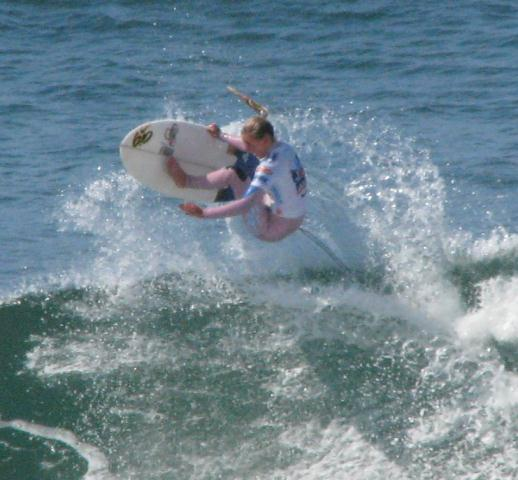
Professional surfer Lakey Peterson competing at the 2011 U.S. Open of Surfing

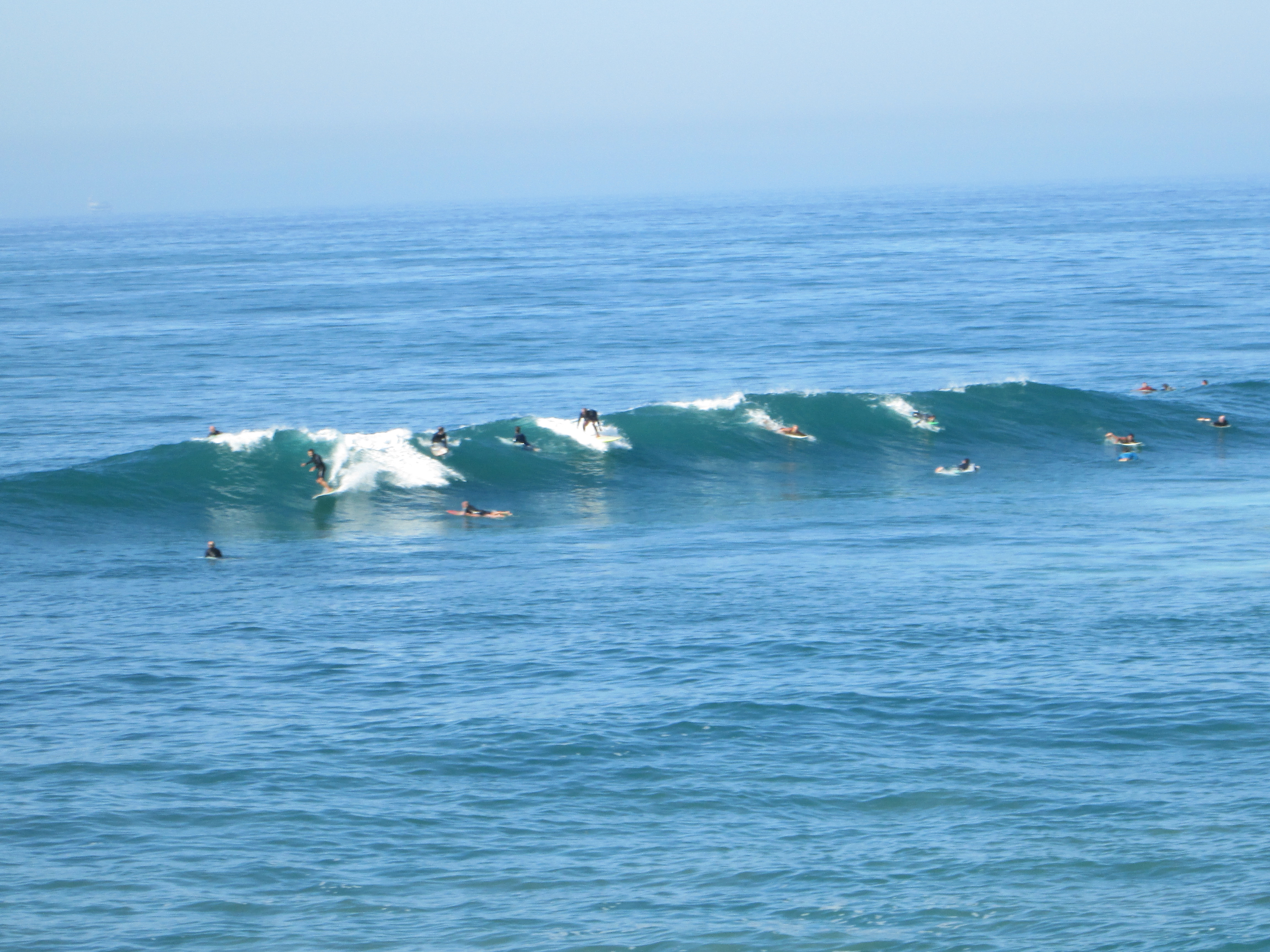
Surfers off of Huntington Beach

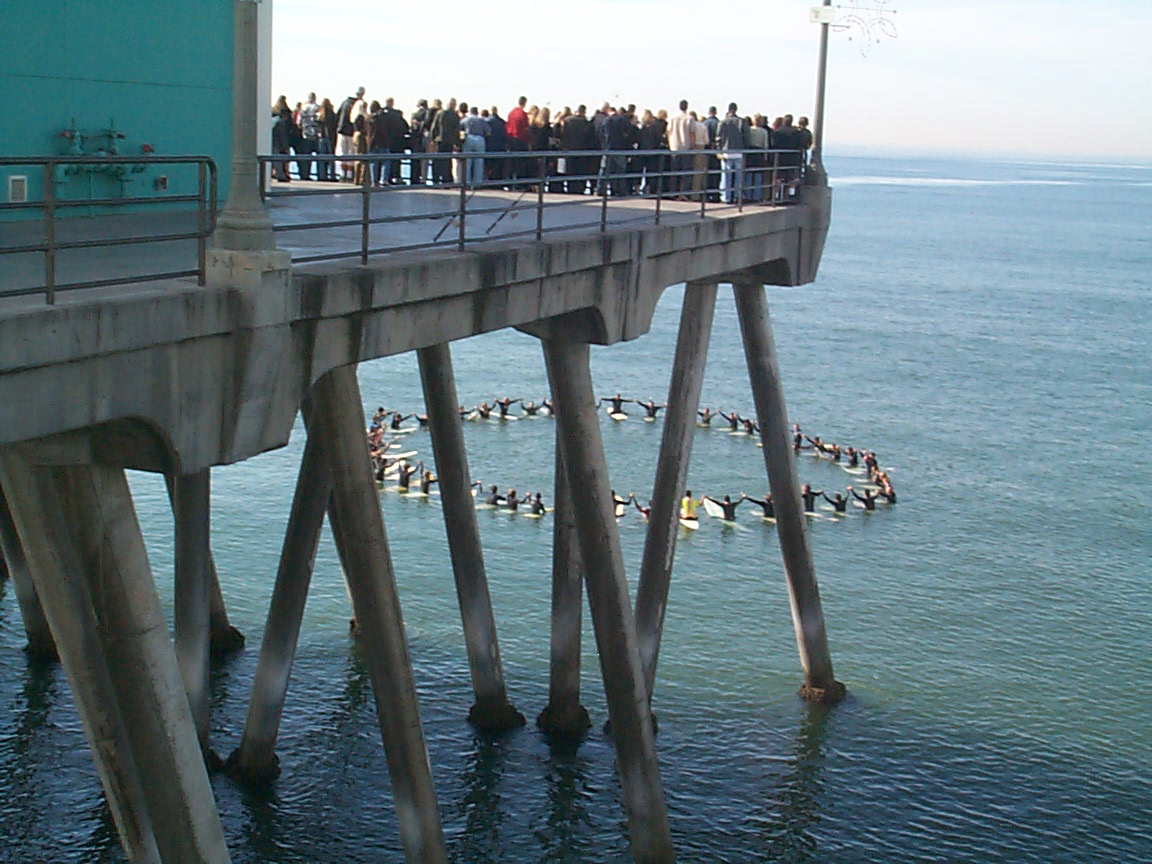
A surfer memorial service being held at the Huntington Beach Pier

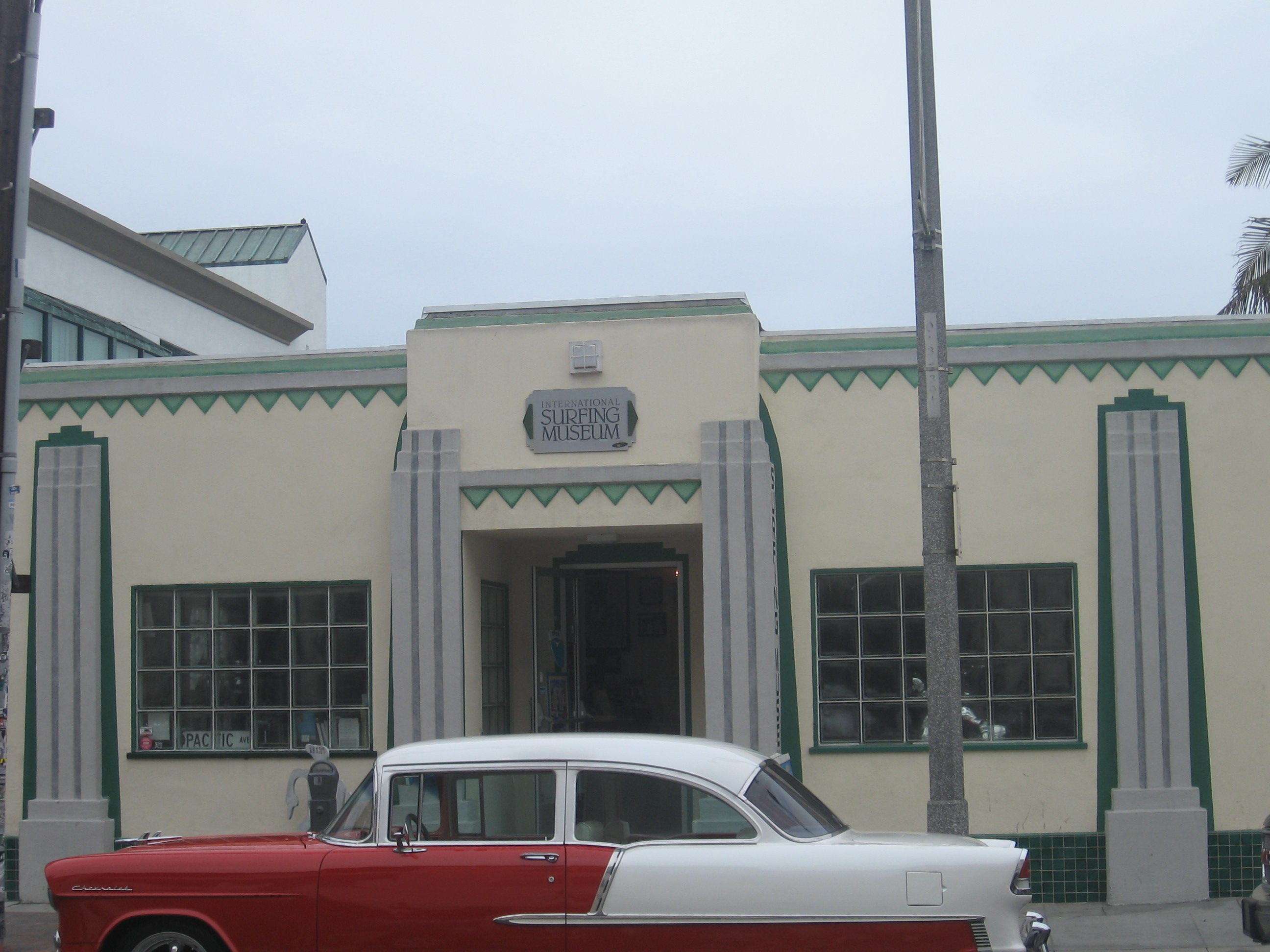
International Surfing Museum
Scenes in Santa Cruz
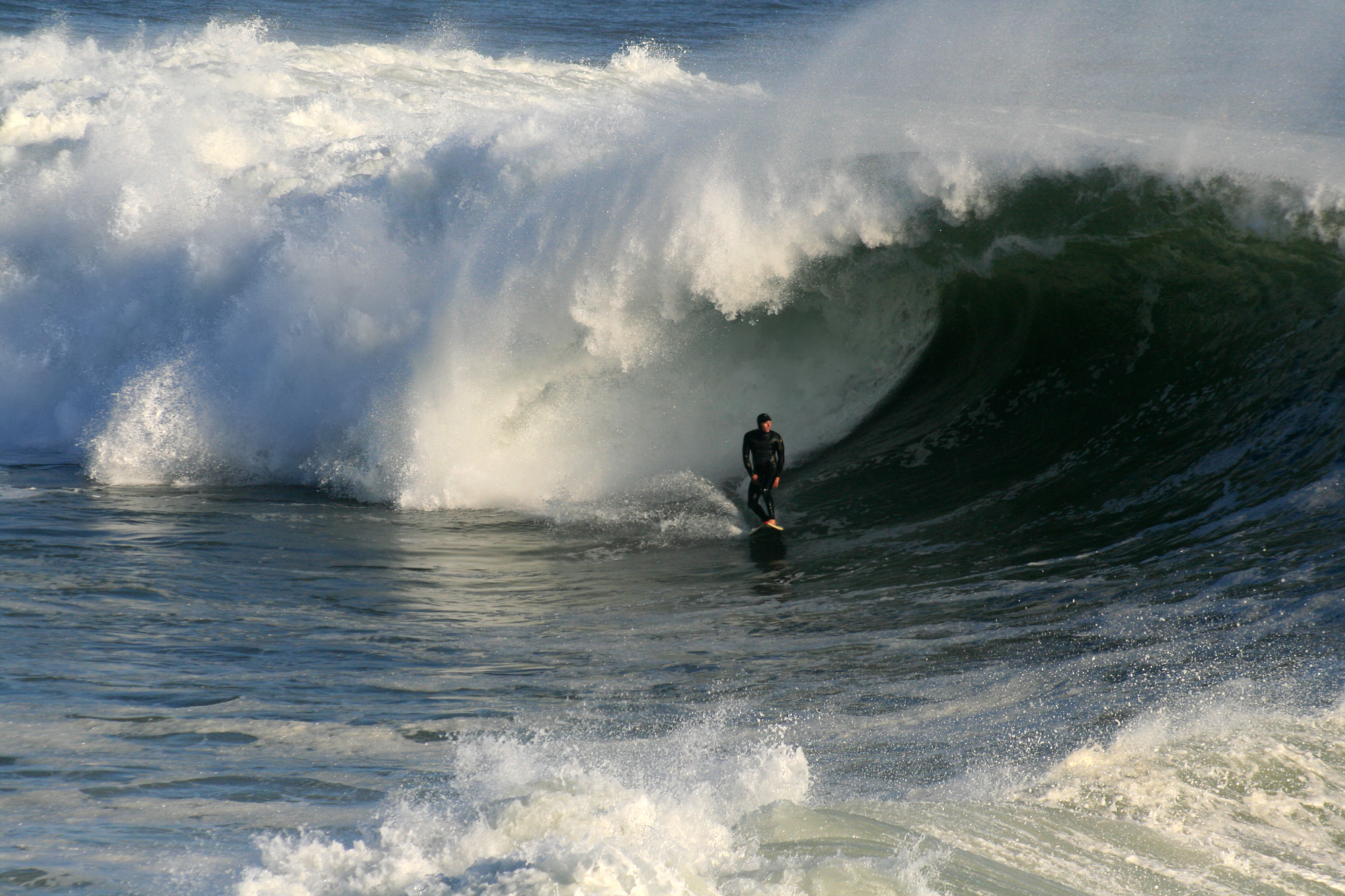
A big wave breaking in Santa Cruz

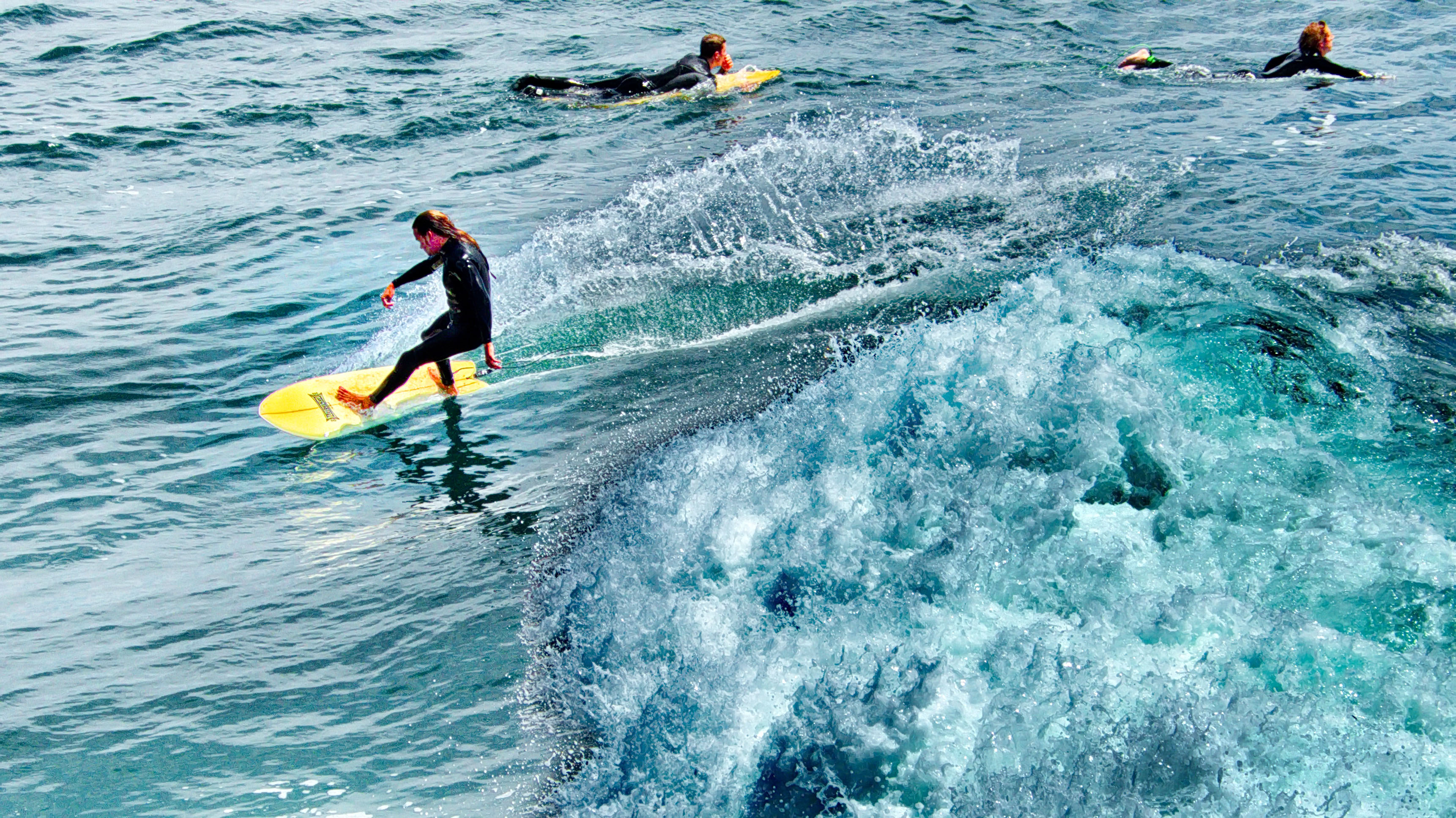
Surfers off of Santa Cruz

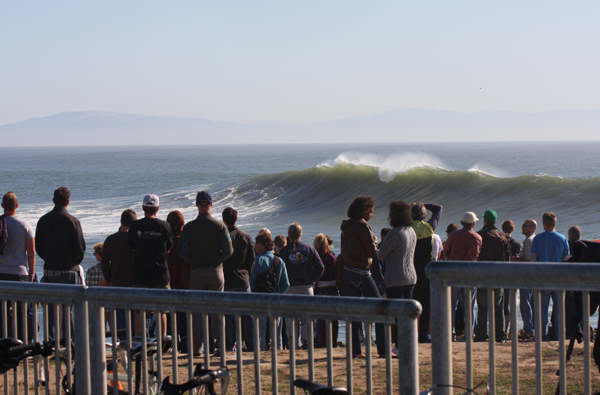
A crowd watches the waves at Steamer Lane

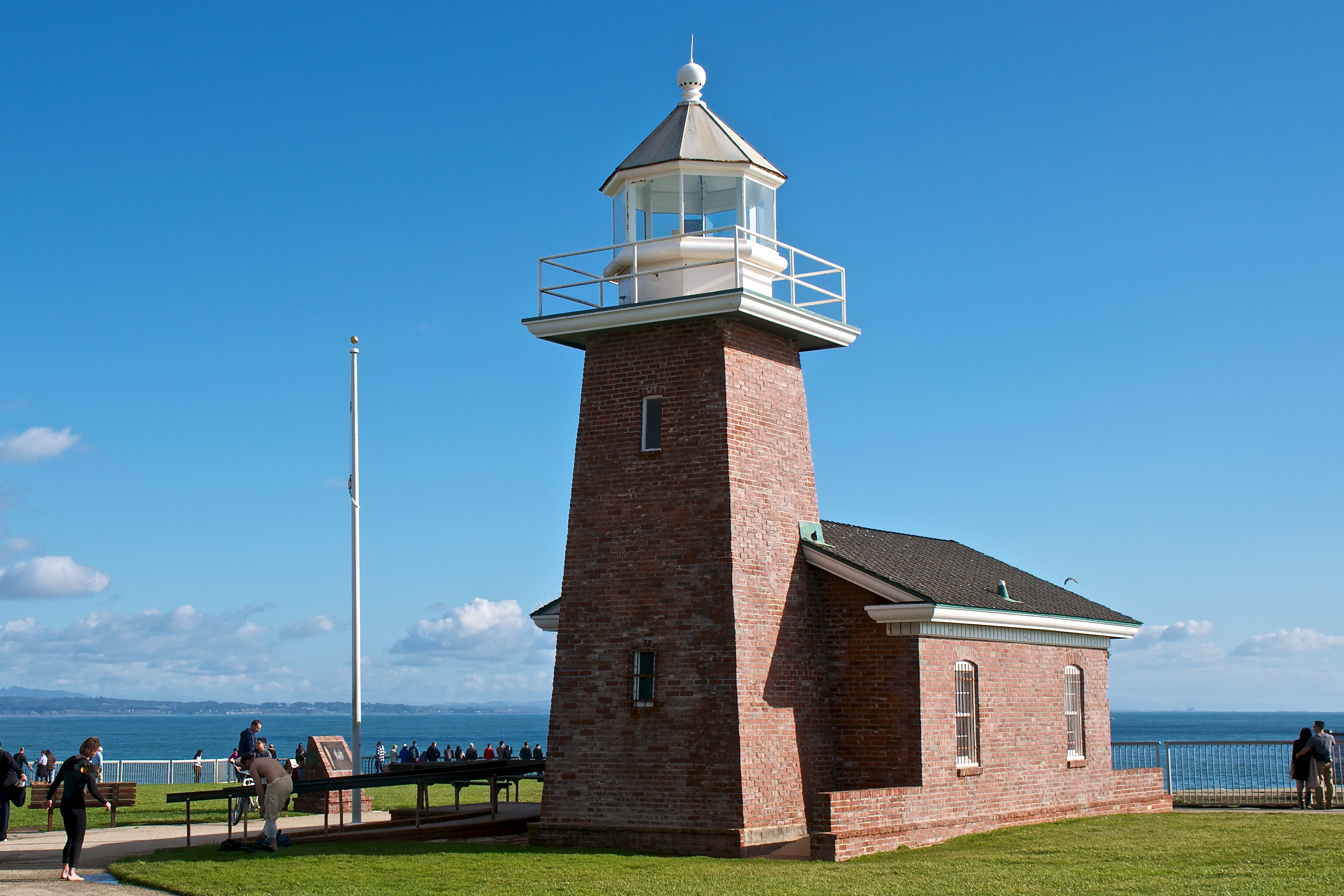
Santa Cruz Surfing Museum
