= Pleasure Point Night Fighters =

Community-oriented organization

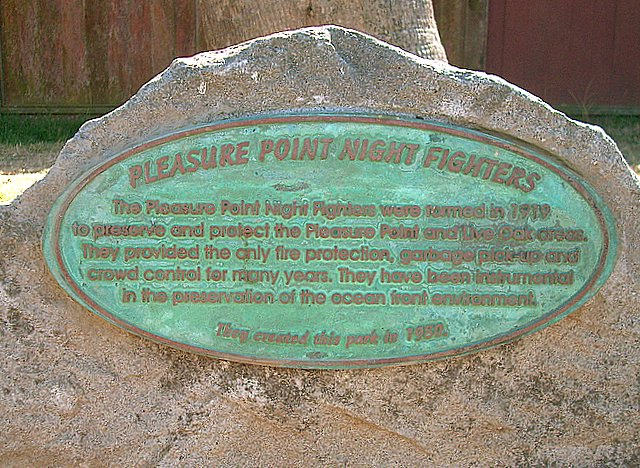
Pleasure Point Night Fighters acknowledgment plaque

The Pleasure Point Night Fighters, a.k.a. PPNF, is a community-oriented organization that comes together to preserve and protect the Pleasure Point area and originated Pack Your Trash.

== Background ==
The Pleasure Point Night Fighters were the first to use the name Pleasure Point. This designation is used to define the surfing community on Soquel Point in the county of Santa Cruz. It is defined by Moran Lagoon, Portola Dr, 41st Ave and the Pacific Ocean.

During the time of Prohibition (1919 to 1933), the Pleasure Point, Santa Cruz, California community was not served by the Santa Cruz City Fire Department after dark. In response to this lack of fire service in the night time, a group of volunteer's organized to fill this need. The Pleasure Point Night Fighters began as a volunteer fire fighters organization. They helped to fight many fires that were started by drunken revelers who came to this remote area between Santa Cruz and Capitola during Prohibition.

PPNF was also renowned as a vigilante organization that kept the peace in unincorporated area of Pleasure Point. The people who were at the mercy of those who came into the area turned to this local organization for protection. The rumors of the many valiant actions and the heroes of this time are still told among the older members of Pleasure Point surfing community.

During World War II, many of the members joined the service to protect the USA from the greater world threat and their activities were suspended. The PPNF was revived in the 1950s when "Pleasure Point Night Fighters" became the call to arms and rebel yell for the locals. Jim Phillips, world-renowned for his surf art and contributions to surf culture, designed the PPNF calling cards. He and Harry Conti, reincarnated the Night Fighters in the 1970s.

== Community work ==
In the 1980s they planned and developed the Night Fighter Park at the corner of Pleasure Point Dr and East Cliff Dr.

They ran Pack Your Trash, for many years. Pack Your Trash started a larger trend that has evolved to larger beach clean-up days. These larger clean-ups are supported by Save Our Shores, Surfrider, Coastal Conservancy and Save Our Seas Hawaii, among others. The PPNF is now a strong community-oriented organization that comes together to preserve and protect the Pleasure Point area.

It is working together with the County to preserve the Pleasure Point roadhouse for a community center. PPNF is working to create guidelines for the Pleasure Point Community Plan, in response to neighborhood concerns about new large houses that overwhelm the traditional beach cottages.

== Gallery ==
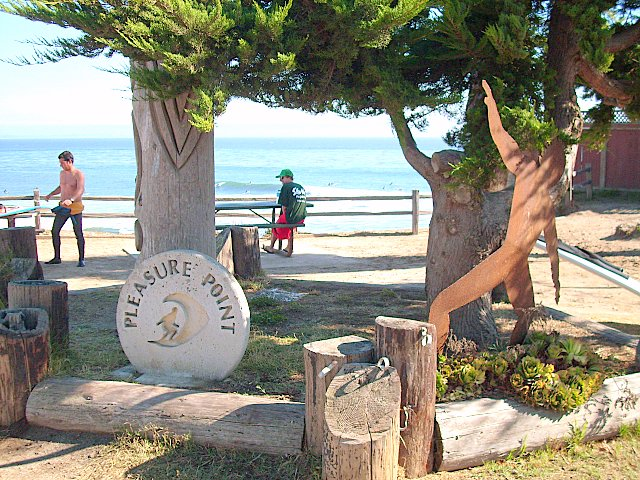
Pleasure Pt Park

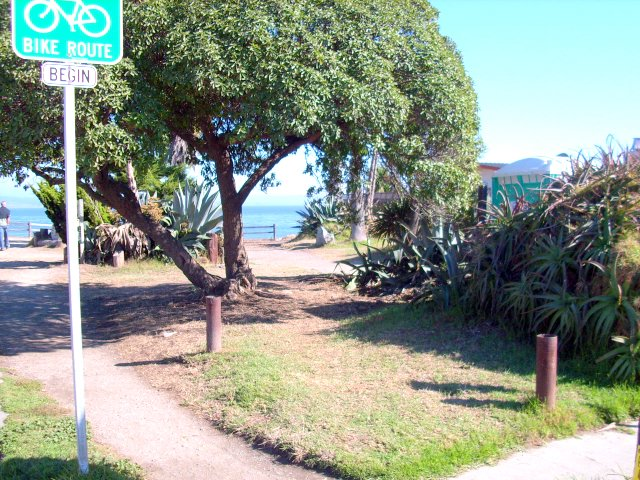
View from Pleasure Point Dr

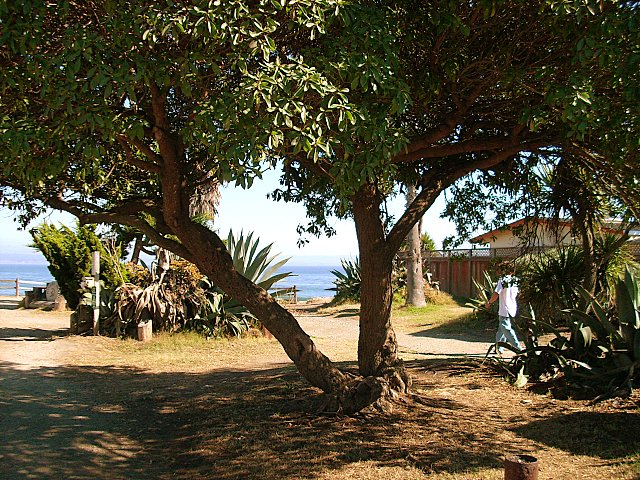
Ocean view
