= L. D. Esty =

American architect (1875–1943)

Lee Dill Esty (August 19, 1875 - July 23, 1943) was an early Arts and Crafts movement architect. He worked with the Berkeley Craftsmen practitioners and has many important projects in Santa Cruz, California, among them the Mission Santa Cruz restoration.

== Pogonip ==
Esty's Pogonip Clubhouse in Pogonip Park is on the National Register of Historic Places. The exterior of the clubhouse was a shooting location for the 1987 film The Lost Boys.

Pogonip Clubhouse

== Houghton House ==
His father-in-law A D Houghton was architect and engineer for John D. Rockefeller. Houghton's house sat on over 100 acres (0.40 km^{2}) of land at the tip of Soquel Pt. Now known as Pleasure Point, Santa Cruz, California It was noted as a beautiful home when it burned in 1915.

== Pleasure Point roadhouse ==
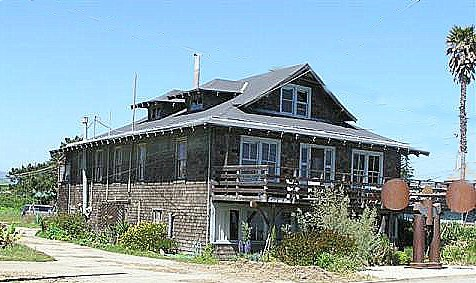
Roadhouse, front west side

The Roadhouse and the Houghton house have many visual similarities. Historians believe that the Pleasure Point roadhouse is an Esty. (1.2) This century old home, with the visual clues and the proximity of this site to Esty/Houghton home, leads historians to this connection. (see Ross)

The Pogonip Clubhouse and the Pleasure Point roadhouse also have many similarities. Both are Brown Shingle construction in Natural settings. Very striking is the visual connection between the back of the Clubhouse and the side of the Roadhouse.

== Arts and crafts influence ==
The Roadhouse pre-dates the American Craftsman style, yet contains many of the elements that are found in it.

From the flared "Oriental" eves, to the "clinker" brick fireplace. The use of natural redwood shingles and the windows to take in the light and warmth. The interior wainscoting and the hardwood floors which were covered with oriental rugs. The placement of the house and its longer western wall, take advantage of the natural oceans setting. The placement is above a natural cove that was accessed by stairs to the beach below.

The Roadhouse maybe the trend setter that led to the Craftsman shingle style Berkeley style made well known by Julia Morgan, Bernard Maybeck and Greene and Greene. It reflects many of the concepts found in The Simple Home, Charles Keeler, 1906 a great influence on the American Craftsman School.

== Esty and the arts and crafts movement ==
Esty went on, in 1931, to work with C. J. Ryland. A former employee of Julia Morgan. Esty went on to rebuild the Santa Cruz Mission and to build the City Halls in Santa Cruz and Monterey, California.
