= Santa Cruz Surfing Museum =

Museum in Santa Cruz, California

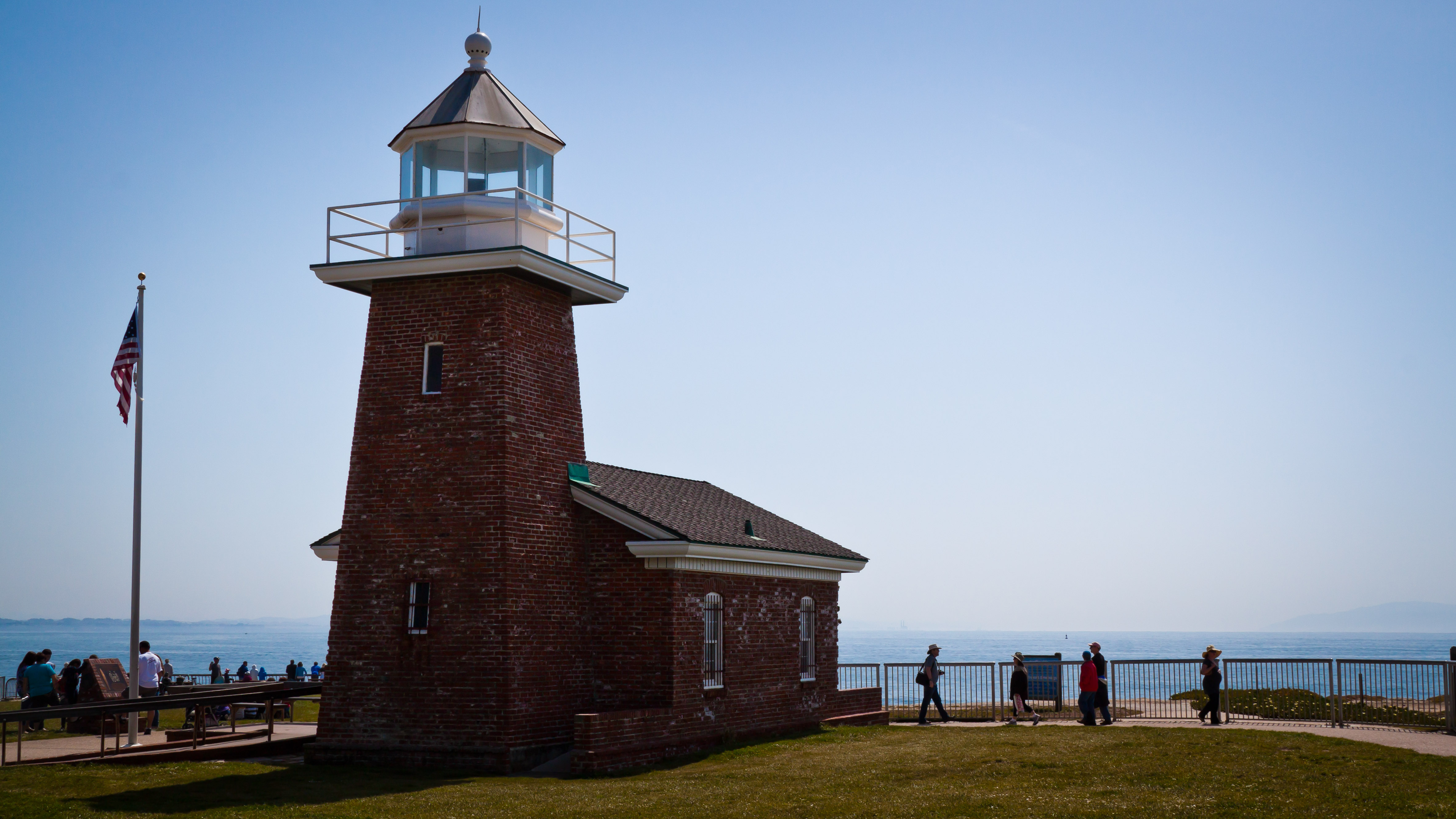
- Established: 1986
- Location: Santa Cruz, California
- Type: History
- Visitors: 70,000 visits annually
- Director: Jenifer Lienau-Thompson
- Website: www.santacruzsurfingmuseum.org
- Santa Cruz Light; Mark Abbott Memorial
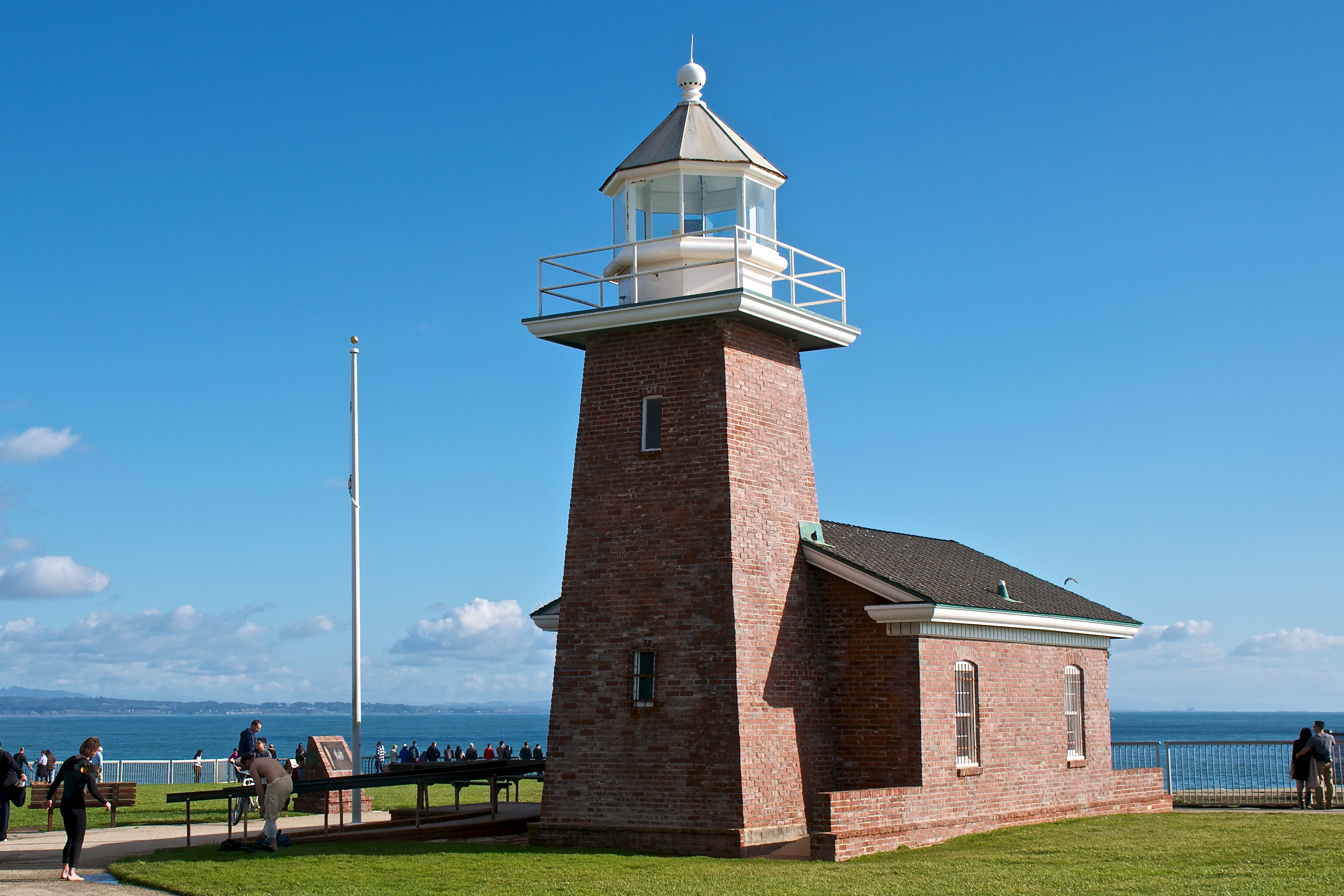
- Coordinates: 36°57′05.34″N 122°01′36.36″W
- Constructed: 1869 (first)
- Construction: brick tower
- Automated: 1941
- Height: 39 feet (12 m)
- Shape: square tower with balcony and lantern
- Markings: unpainted tower, white lantern
- Operator: Santa Cruz Surfing Museum
- First lit: 1967 (current)
- Focal height: 60 feet (18 m)
- Lens: Fifth order Fresnel lens (removed)
- Range: 12 nautical miles (22 km; 14 mi)
- Characteristic: Fl W 5s.

The Santa Cruz Surfing Museum is a museum which was established in May 1986 to document the history of surfing. With collections dating back to the earliest years of surfing on mainland United States, the museum houses a historical account of surfing in Santa Cruz, California.

== Location ==
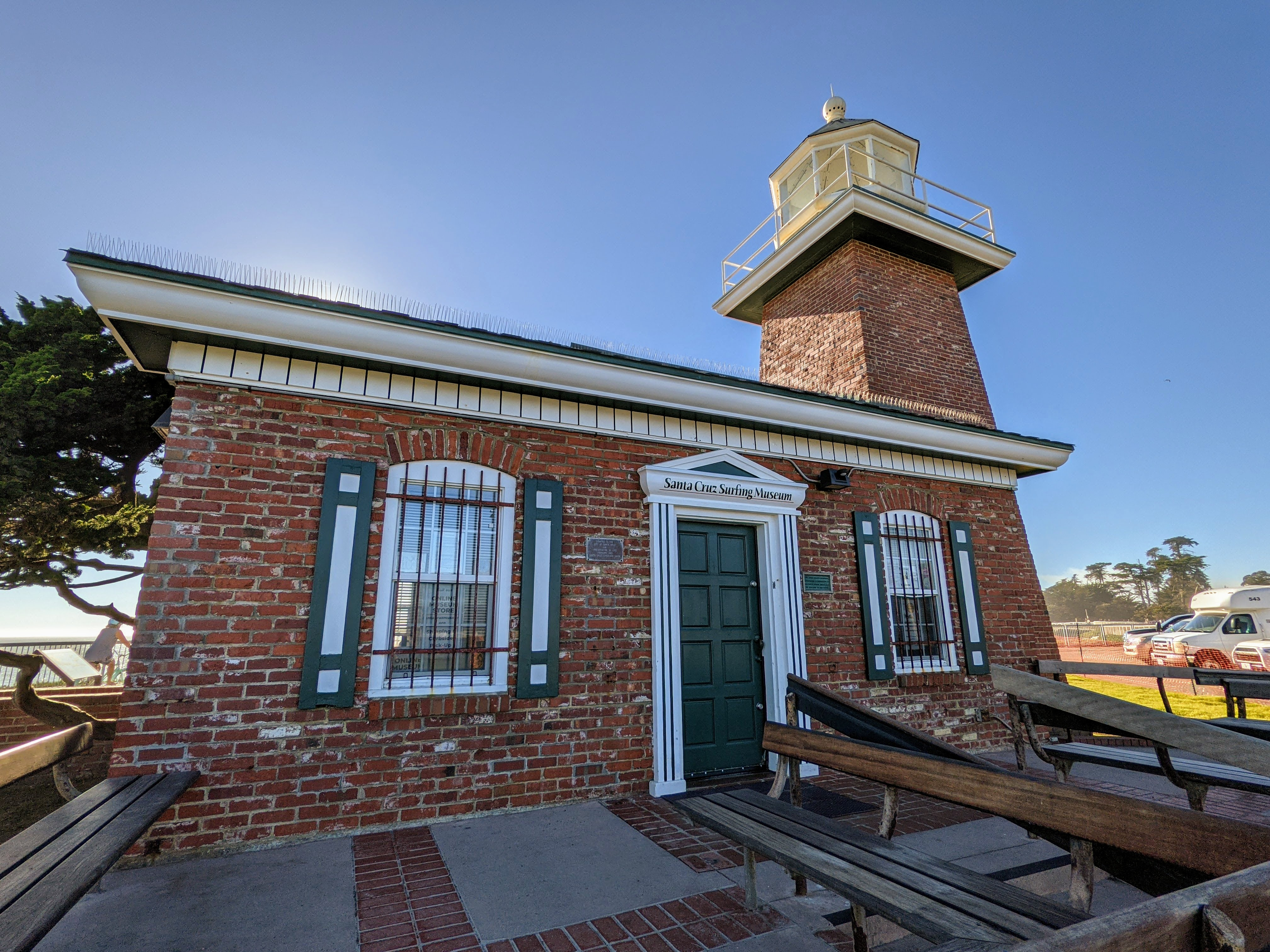
Entrance to the Santa Cruz Surfing Museum

Located in the Mark Abbott Memorial Lighthouse at Lighthouse Point on West Cliff Drive, the Santa Cruz Surfing Museum opened its doors in June 1986 as the first surfing museum in the world.

The lighthouse was built in 1967 as a memorial to surfer Mark Abbott, who died while surfing at the nearby Pleasure Point surf break.

Overlooking the Steamer Lane surfing hotspot, this little museum features photographs, surfboards, and videos tracing over 100 years of surfing history in Santa Cruz. After funding cuts in 2009, the Santa Cruz Surfing Club Preservation Society and private donations kept the museum open.

== Exhibits ==
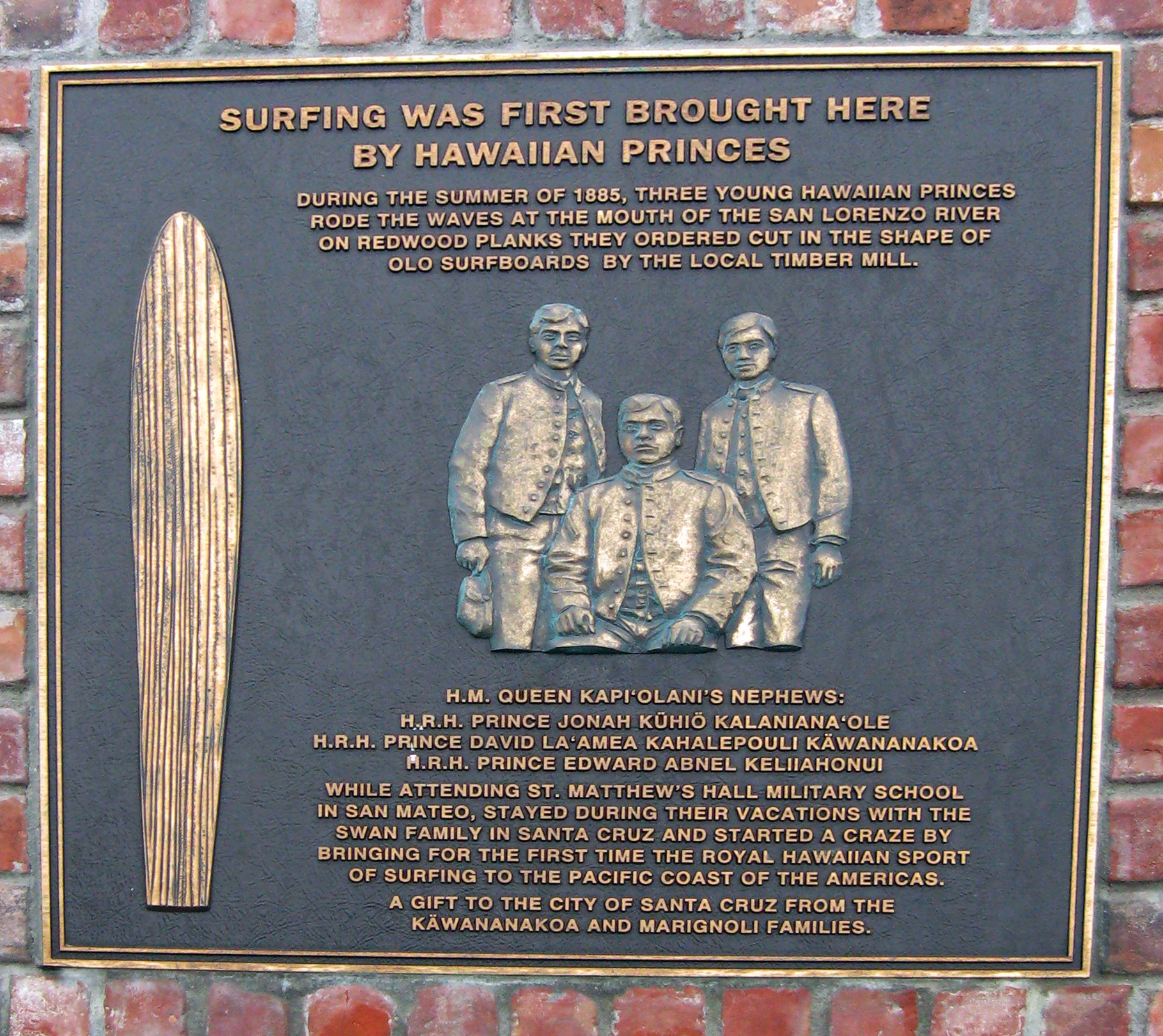
Plaque honoring 1885 Hawaiian surfers

The exhibits at the museum explore over 100 years of surfing in Santa Cruz. Introduced in 1885 by three Hawaiian princes who surfed the mouth of the San Lorenzo River on plank boards, surfing has permeated every facet of the Santa Cruz community. A plaque was dedicated to the princes: David Kawānanakoa, Edward Abnel Keliʻiahonui, and Jonah Kūhiō Kalanianaʻole (later a delegate to US Congress) in April 2010.

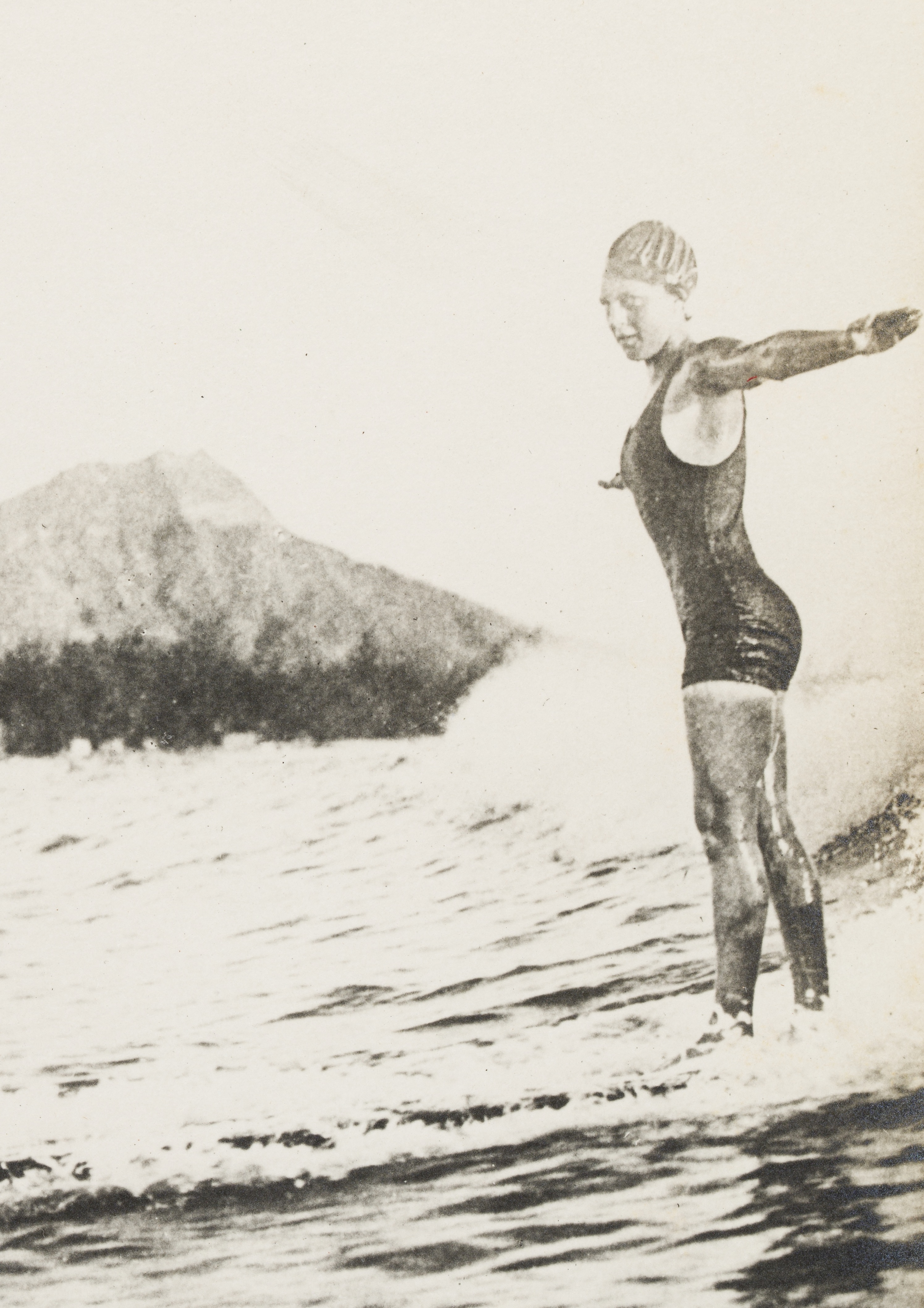
Dorothy Becker in 1915, a surfing pioneer featured at the museum

Throughout its history, surf culture has reflected and responded to popular culture. Photographs chronicle the evolution of surfing culture in Santa Cruz from idyllic summers spent at the beach in the 1930s and 1940s, through the hipster beach party 1950s, the surf rock 1960s, the "soul surfing" 1970s, the neon 1980s, and the rebirth of classic long-board riding in the 1990s.

Examples of surfboards from each era are on display, from the huge hollow paddle boards and redwood planks made and ridden in the 1930s and 1940s to examples of early foam and fiberglass boards, and speedy short boards used to create radical new surf moves beginning in the 1970s.

== Santa Cruz Light ==
The museum contains the current Santa Cruz Light, marking Point Santa Cruz on the west side of Santa Cruz Anchorage.

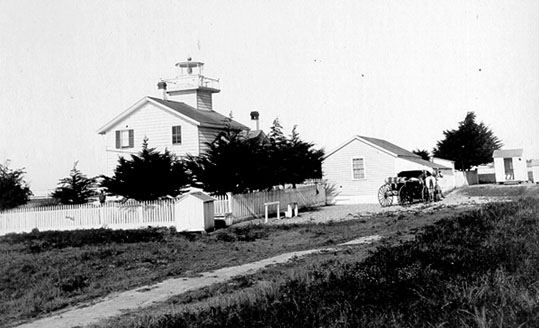
Undated USCG photo of the original lighthouse

The original lighthouse was one of a number of California coastal lights allocated funding by Congress in 1850, only 19 days after statehood. Because of disputes over ownership of the land, construction did not proceed until 1868. The original light was a two-story wooden structure, with a lantern housing a fifth-order Fresnel lens. Erosion of Point Santa Cruz required the lighthouse to be moved back 300 feet (91 m) in 1879.

Around 1909 (sources vary, possibly 1913) the lens was replaced with a fourth-order Fresnel, for better visibility against the light of the city. The light was electrified in 1917, replaced by a wooden tower in 1941, and the original building demolished in 1948.

== See also ==
- List of lighthouses in the United States
