= Opal Cliffs, California =

Unincorporated community in California, United States

Opal Cliffs
- unincorporated community (former census-designated place)
- Location in Santa Cruz County and the state of California
- Coordinates: 36°57′41″N 121°58′15″W
- Country: United States
- State: California
- County: Santa Cruz

Area
  - Total: 2.0 sq mi (5.2 km^{2})
  - Land: 0.77 sq mi (2 km^{2})
  - Water: 1.2 sq mi (3.2 km^{2})
- Elevation: 46 ft (14 m)

Population (2000)
  - Total: 6,458
  - Density: 3,217/sq mi (1,241.9/km^{2})
- Time zone: UTC-8 (PST)
  - Summer (DST): UTC-7 (PDT)
- ZIP code: 95062
- Area code: 831
- FIPS code: 06-53924
- GNIS feature ID: 1659307

Opal Cliffs is an unincorporated community in Santa Cruz County, California, United States.

The population was 6,458 at the 2000 census. For statistical purposes, the United States Census Bureau defined Opal Cliffs as a census-designated place (CDP). The Opal Cliffs CDP was abolished prior to the 2010 census and replaced with the Pleasure Point CDP. The census definition of the area may not precisely correspond to local understanding of the area with the same name.

== Geography ==
Opal Cliffs is located at 36°57′41″N 121°58′15″W (36.961500, -121.970920).

According to the United States Census Bureau, the CDP had a total area of 2.0 square miles (5.2 km^{2}), of which 0.8 square miles (2.1 km^{2}) was land and 1.2 square miles (3.1 km^{2}) (61.50%) was water.

== Demographics ==
Historical population
Census	Pop.	Note	%±
1960	3,825		—
1970	5,425		41.8%
1980	5,041		−7.1%
1990	5,940		17.8%
2000	6,458		8.7%
U.S. Decennial Census; 1860–1870 1880-1890; 1900 1910 1920; 1930 1940 1950; 1960 1970 1980; 1990 2000 2010

As of the census of 2000, there were 6,458 people, 2,843 households, and 1,410 families residing in the CDP. The population density was 8,353.9 inhabitants per square mile (3,225.5/km^{2}). There were 3,169 housing units at an average density of 4,099.3 per square mile (1,582.7/km^{2}). The racial makeup of the CDP was 84.87% White, 0.98% African American, 0.77% Native American, 2.20% Asian, 0.14% Pacific Islander, 6.41% from other races, and 4.63% from two or more races. Hispanic or Latino of any race were 12.51% of the population.

There were 2,843 households, out of which 24.6% had children under the age of 18 living with them, 33.5% were married couples living together, 10.7% had a female householder with no husband present, and 50.4% were non-families. 33.6% of all households were made up of individuals, and 9.4% had someone living alone who was 65 years of age or older. The average household size was 2.24 and the average family size was 2.84.

In the CDP, the population was spread out, with 18.5% under the age of 18, 9.8% from 18 to 24, 36.7% from 25 to 44, 24.9% from 45 to 64, and 10.1% who were 65 years of age or older. The median age was 37 years. For every 100 females, there were 104.8 males. For every 100 females age 18 and over, there were 102.6 males.

The median income for a household in the CDP was $42,673, and the median income for a family was $48,258. Males had a median income of $43,705 versus $31,729 for females. The per capita income for the CDP was $29,617. About 8.9% of families and 14.2% of the population were below the poverty line, including 13.6% of those under age 18 and 11.9% of those age 65 or over.

== Government ==
In the California State Legislature, Opal Cliffs is in the 17th senatorial district, represented by Democrat John Laird, and in the 29th Assembly district, represented by Democrat Robert Rivas.

In the United States House of Representatives, Opal Cliffs is in California's 19th congressional district, represented by Democrat Jimmy Panetta.
