= Pleasure Point roadhouse =

Building on the Monterey Bay, California, United States

Coordinates: 36.95945°N 121.96651°W

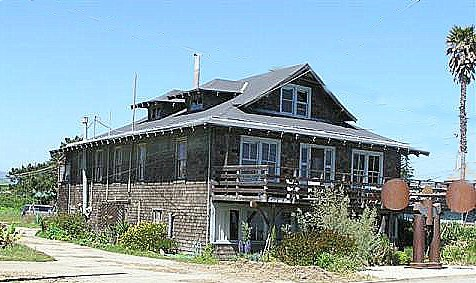
Pleasure Point roadhouse, 2007

The Pleasure Point Roadhouse was a historic building on the Monterey Bay, located at 2-3905 East Cliff Dr., 95062 in Santa Cruz County, California. It originally served as a house and later a roadhouse and was torn down September 27, 2008.

== Built by John J. Henchy ==
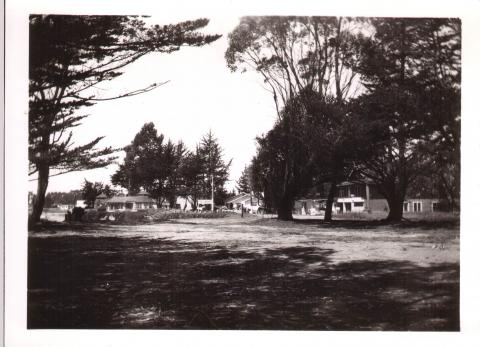
Setting of the Pleasure Point Roadhouse, before 1927

The house was built between 1902 and 1904 by former San Francisco saloon owner John J. Henchy. He bought the land that now spans 38th Ave. to 41st Ave. on the coast of Pleasure Point, Santa Cruz, California. Henchy built his home on the property he bought from N E Neary, thus acquiring a natural view of the cove and Monterey Bay.

He built his home in a trapezoidal form that aligned with East Cliff Dr. The second story living area and master bedroom had great ocean views. A long, enclosed light-filled gallery wrapped around the east and south sides of the main floor and created a sun porch. The front deck afforded an expansive ocean view. It had many elements derived from the Early Craftsman Style thinking. Henchy's large shingle-sided house and drive-through carriage house were the first large impressive buildings in the area.

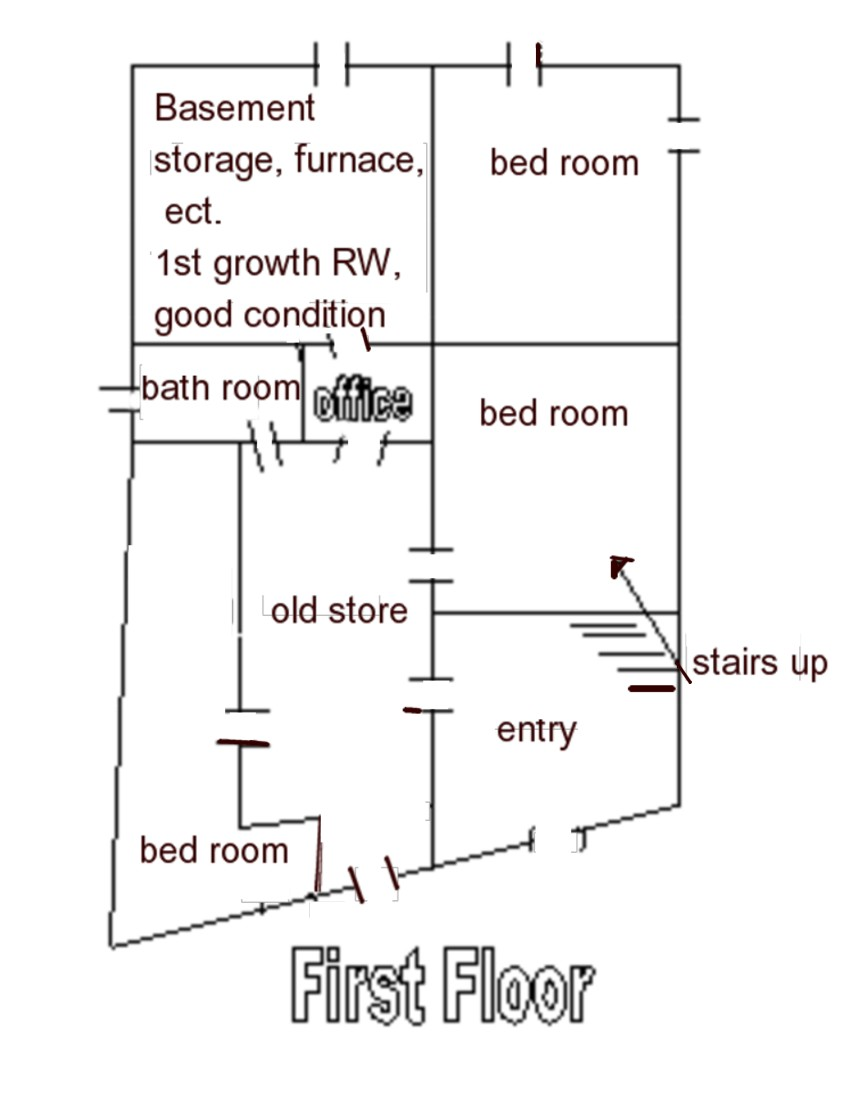
1st floor Roadhouse.

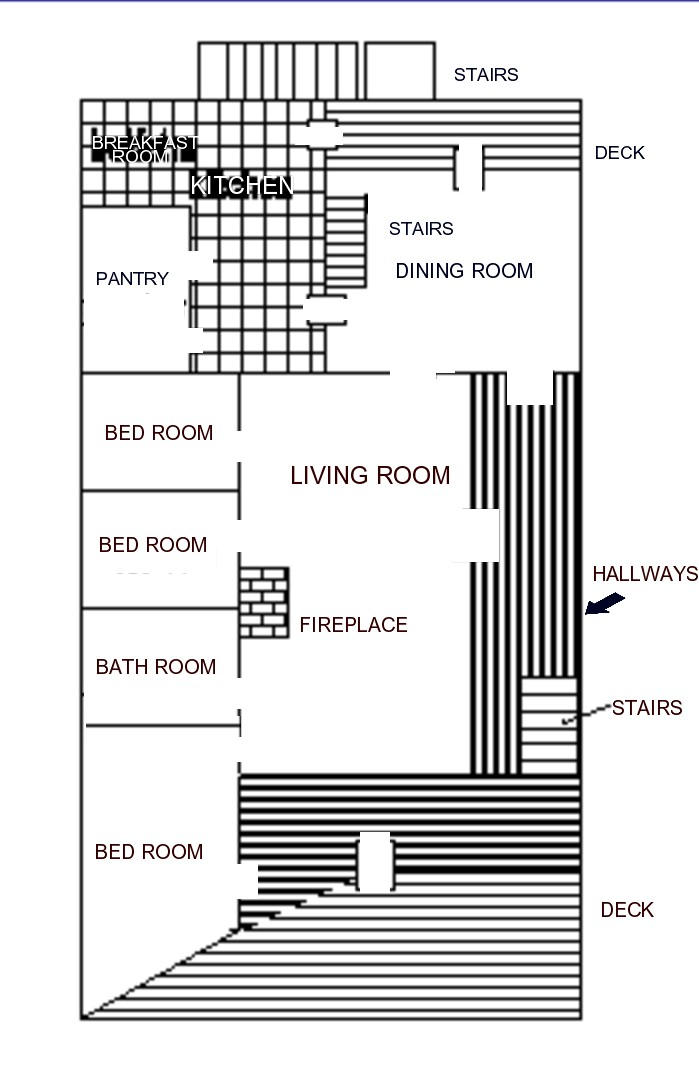
2nd floor Roadhouse

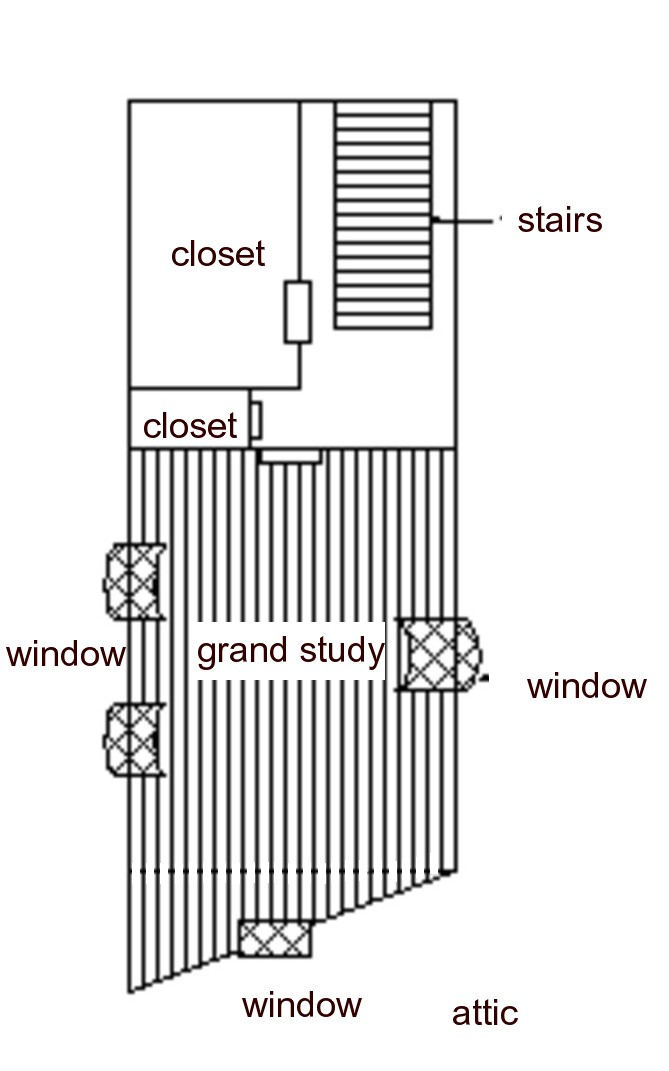
Attic, reading room

The dining room opened off the living room and was adjacent to the kitchen. The kitchen opened into the windowed breakfast area with views to the natural setting and mountains behind.

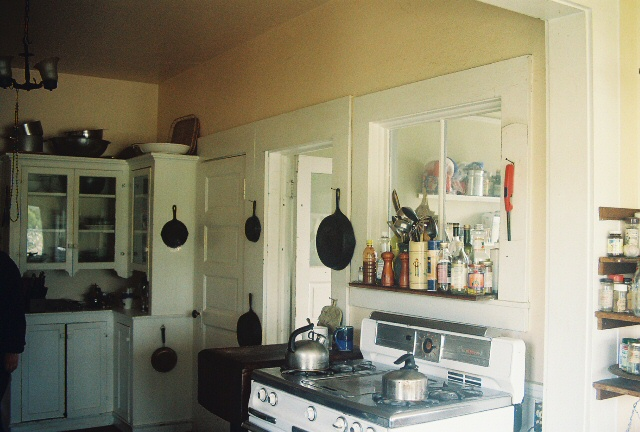
Kitchen

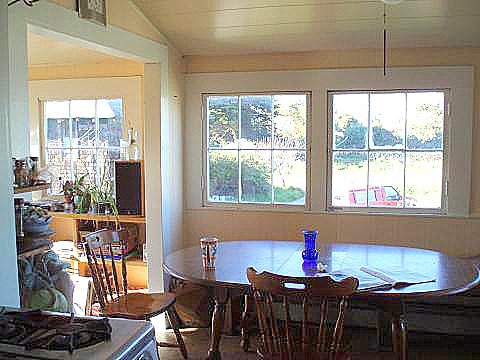
Breakfast room off kitchen

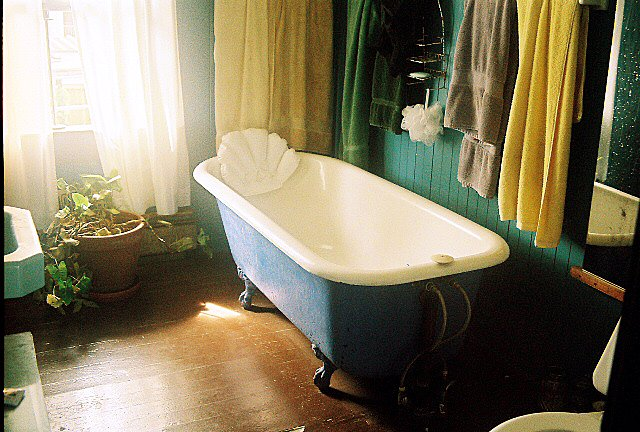
Bathtub in bathroom next to fireplace

The front door opened directly into the living room, which in turn connected to the dining room. Often, the two rooms were separated only by a half wall.

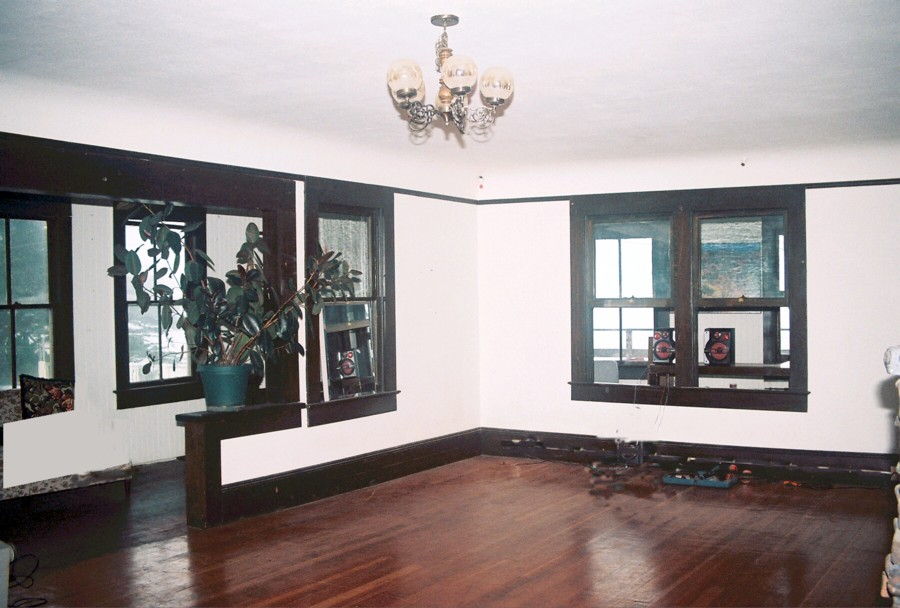

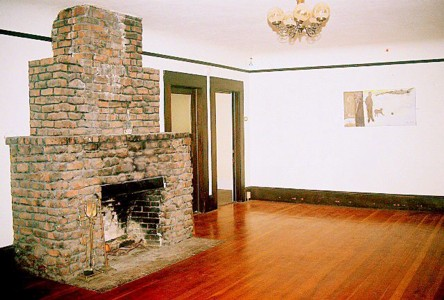

The wood-paneled attic room, used as the reading room, took advantage of the natural, wooded ocean setting with its hardwood floors and windows.

== Architect ==
The Roadhouse pre-dated the American Craftsman style, yet contained many of the elements that are found in it. The Roadhouse may be the trend setter that led to the Craftsman shingle style Berkeley style made well known by Julia Morgan, Bernard Maybeck and Greene and Greene. It reflects many of the concepts found in The Simple Home, Charles Keeler, 1906, a great influence on the Craftsman School.

This century-old home, with the visual clues and the proximity of this site to Esty/Houghton home, leads historians to believe that is an L D Esty home. (see Ross) HisPogonip Clubhouse is on the National Register of Historic Places.

== History of ownership ==
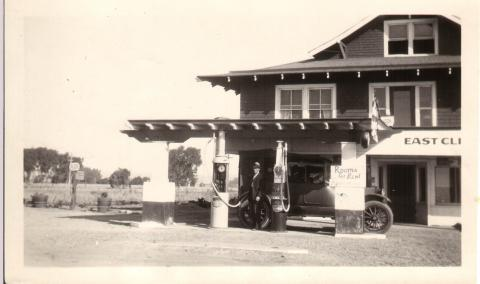
Roadhouse Gas Station, 1927

It was owned and occupied by a number of locally successful families.

- 1908 N Neary
- 1921 J Menzel
- 1926 Anton V Peterson Built the gas station, store and Cosy Cottage Resort.
- 1971 Liela Naslund of Los Gatos bought the property. She removed the gas station and store. She rented the rooms and cottages and kept an apartment on the lower back floor.
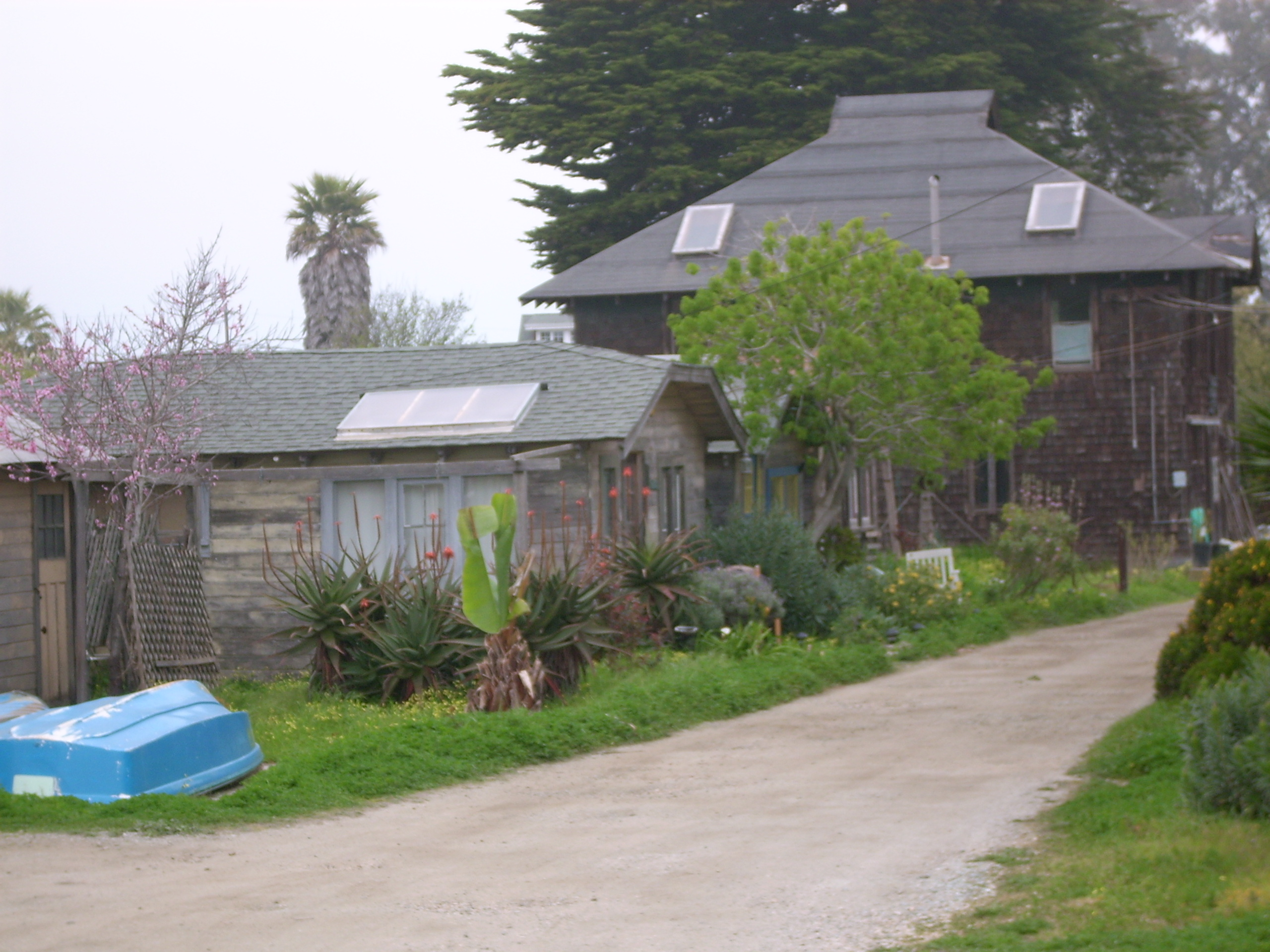
Cottages and barn from East Cliff Dr

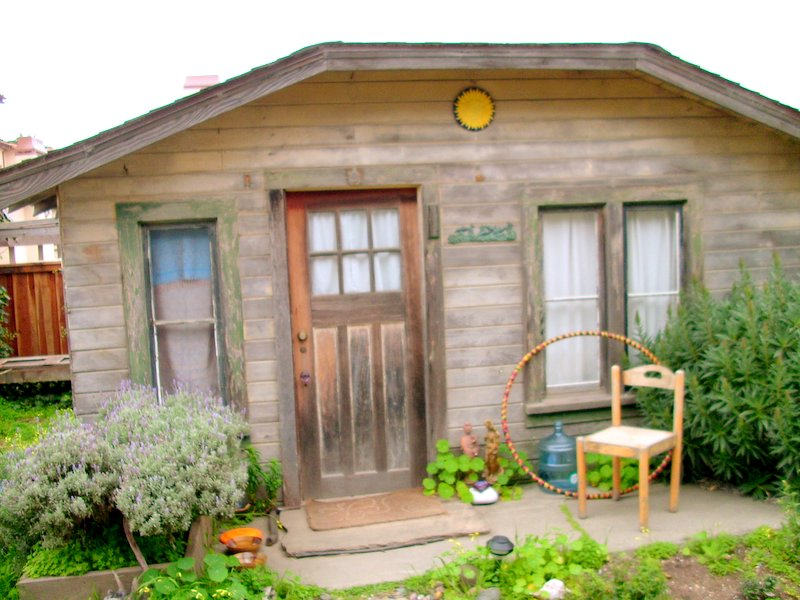
1st cottage

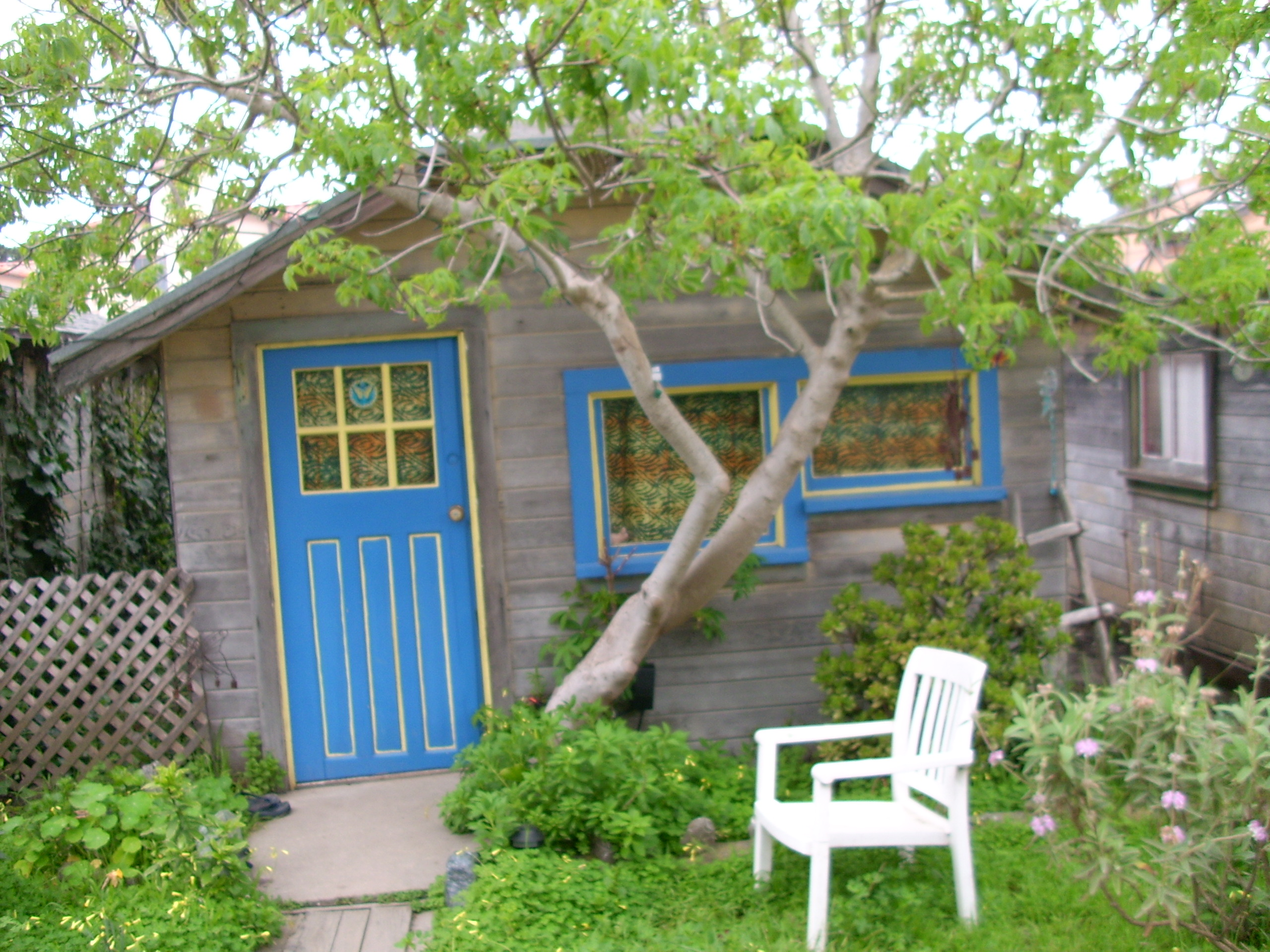
2nd cottage

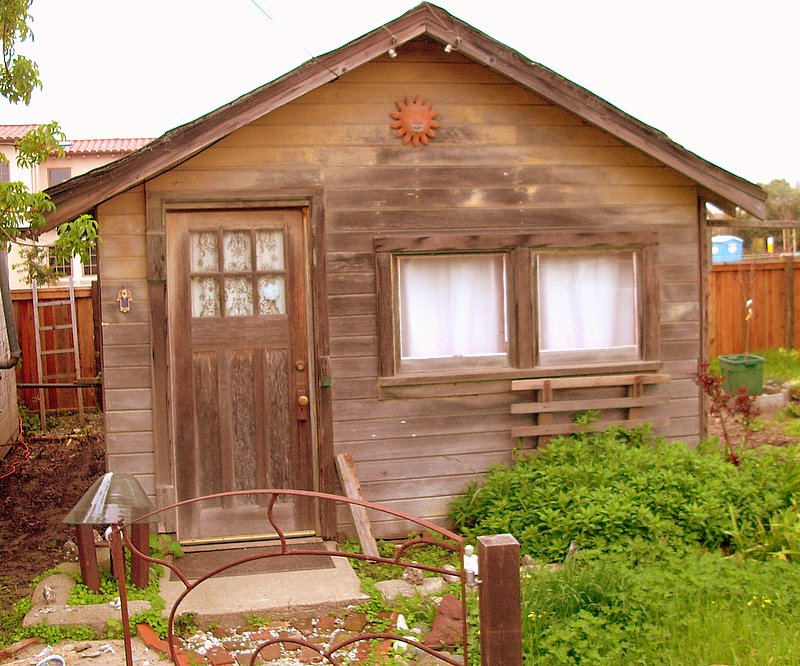
3rd cottage

== Effort for historic listing ==
2007 The county in updating historic property inventory had the Roadhouse nominated by the Live Oak History group as one of its highest priorities for listing. Activist Charles Paulden worked with the group. He also started up a group called People for the Preservation of Pleasure Point. The group wanted it preserved as a landmark and Paulden said that it should be restored and used as a museum or community center.

Anthony Kirk was hired by the absentee homeowner to challenge the Historic designation. The tenants were evicted and the property fenced with chain link. Also barbed wire erected around the property. It is rumored that the owner's daughters gave the tenants 60 days to vacate.

The County of Santa Cruz is considering it as a park.

It was torn down on September 27, 2008.

Part of the heavy plastic outdoor furniture was bought by Judith & Buck Hoelscher and is now being used at their Vacation Rental, The Tudor Rose Manor's yard in the flats in Rio del Mar beach area.

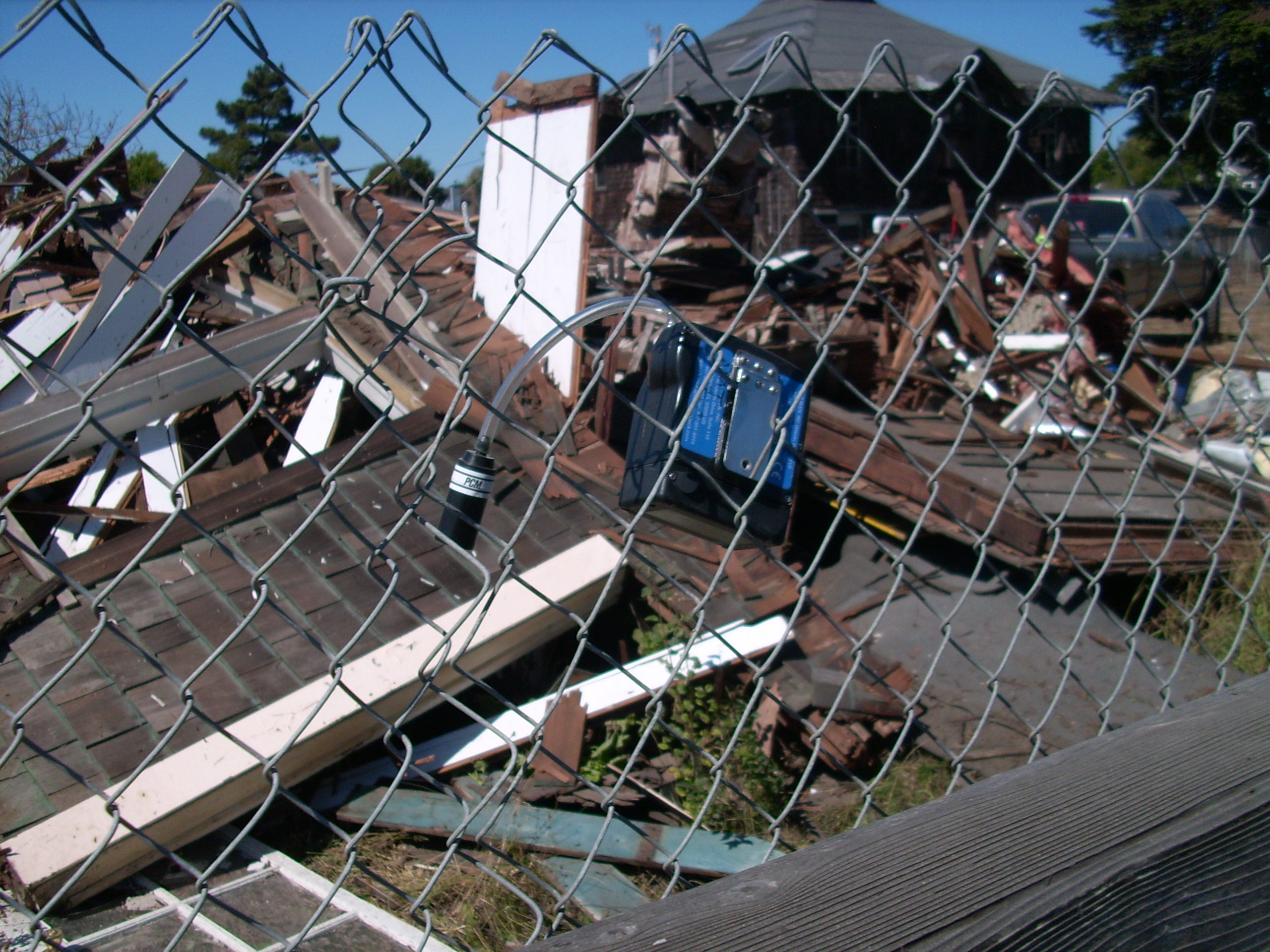
Broken wood from the destruction of the Roadhouse

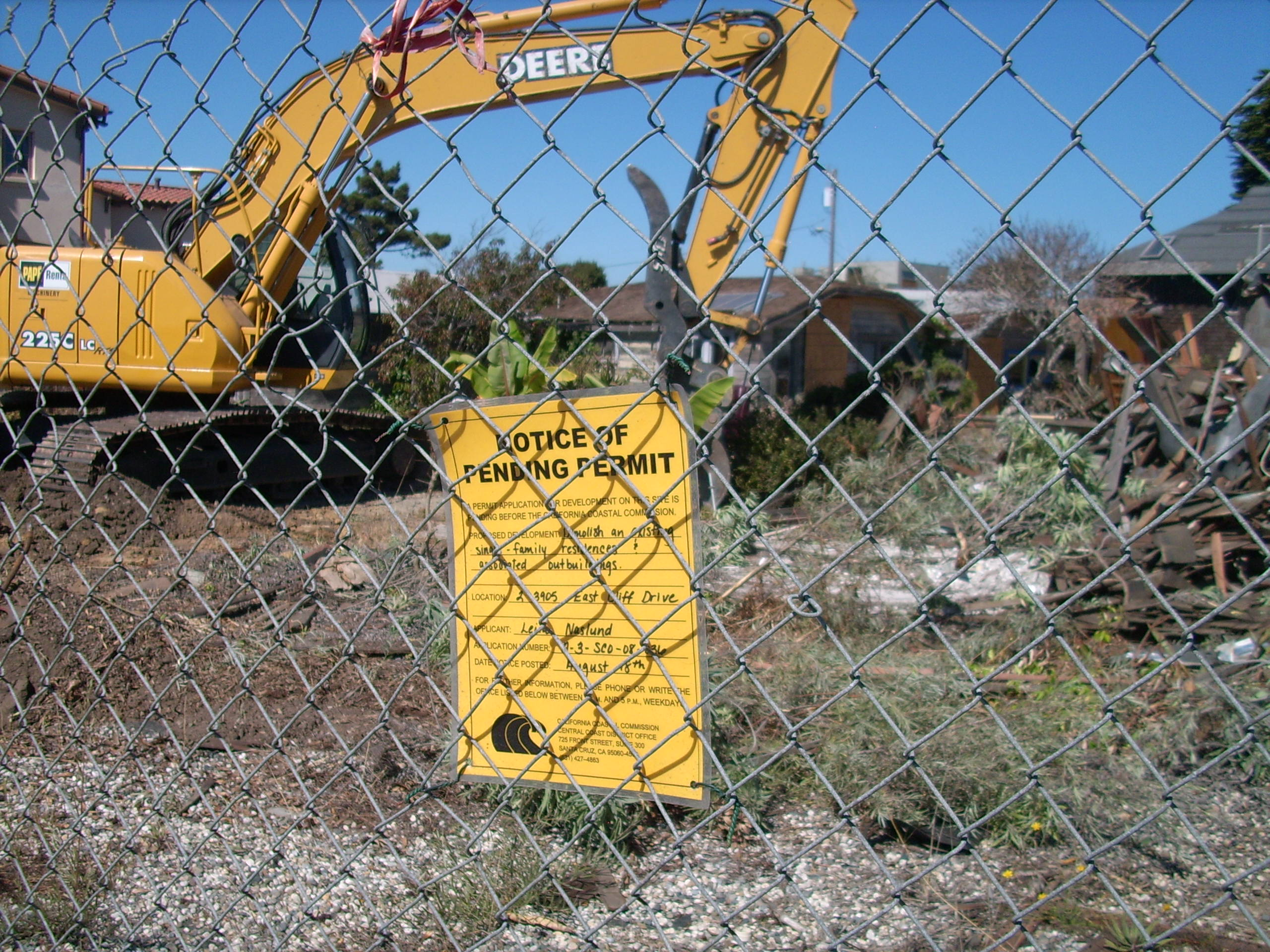
Despite the Public appeal to the Coastal Commission it was destroyed and not recycled or moved

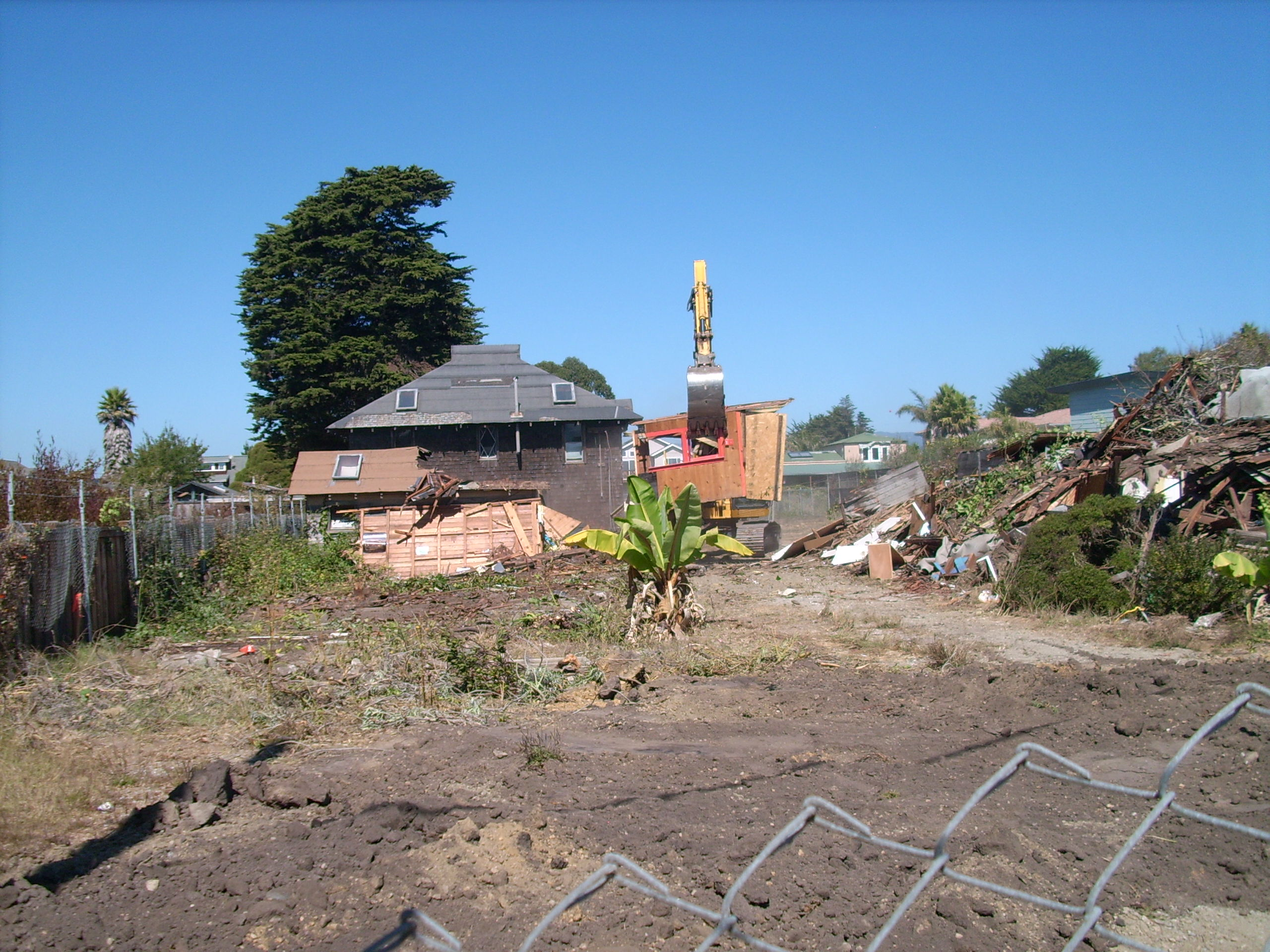
The County said the structures could not be moved, even though the Cottages could have been. The next day the buildings were destroyed.

== Sources ==
- Ross Gibson HISTORIC SIGNIFICANCE OF THE PLEASURE POINT ROADHOUSE, 2007 2007 DPR for 2-3905 East Cliff Dr., Santa Cruz, Ca 95062
- Norm Poltevan 2007 research for History Journal
- Carol Swift 2007 DPR for 2-3905 East Cliff Dr., Santa Cruz, Ca 95062
