= Steamer Lane =

Famous surfing spot in Santa Cruz, California

Coordinates: 36°57′14″N 122°01′27″W

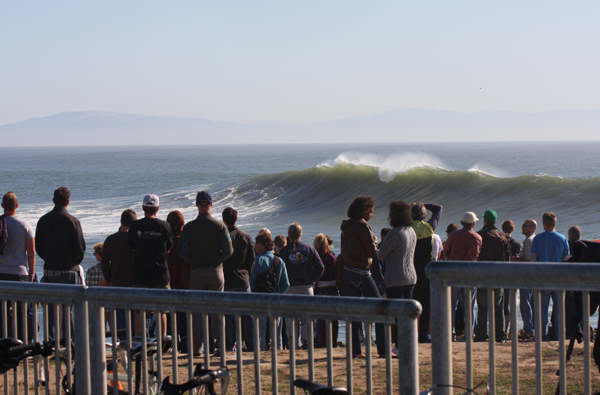
A crowd gathers near the lighthouse to watch the waves at Steamer Lane.

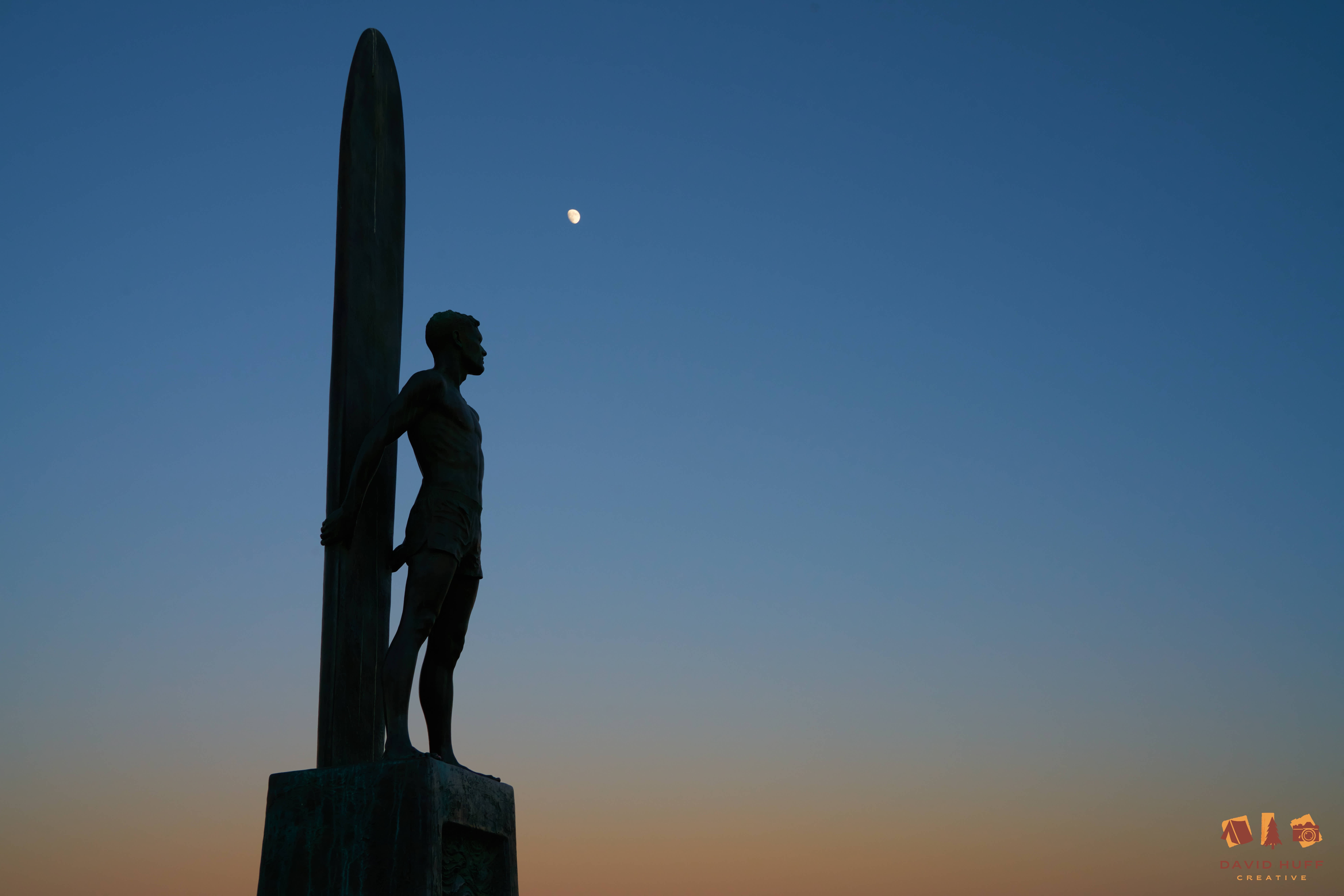
Surfing Statue

Steamer Lane is a famous surfing location in Santa Cruz, California. It is just off a point on the side of cliffs in the West Cliff residential area near downtown Santa Cruz, providing easy access and a good vantage point for viewing. The Santa Cruz Surfing Museum is housed in a lighthouse there. "Steamer Lane" is the preferred form of the name used by the people surfing there. Steamer Lane was named by Claude Horan while he was a student at San Jose State in the late 1930s. One flat calm day he and his friend Wes Hammond thought it would be a good idea to hire steamships to cruise back and forth to generate waves for surfing. It was at Steamer Lane that the modern surfing wetsuit and the leash were mainly developed by Jack O'Neill, who had his surf shop nearby for many years.

== Geography ==
The cliffs overlooking Steamer Lane are composed of Quaternary period marine deposits, part of the Purisima formation. The rock underneath the lane is Santa Cruz mudstone from the Miocene era. Steamer Lane is part of the Monterey Bay National Marine Sanctuary.

There are four parts to Steamer Lane: Indicators, Middle Peak, The Slot, and The Point. Third Reef is an expert surfing zone just beyond the Lane and closely related.

Down coast to the east is Soquel Point, also known as Pleasure Point, California.

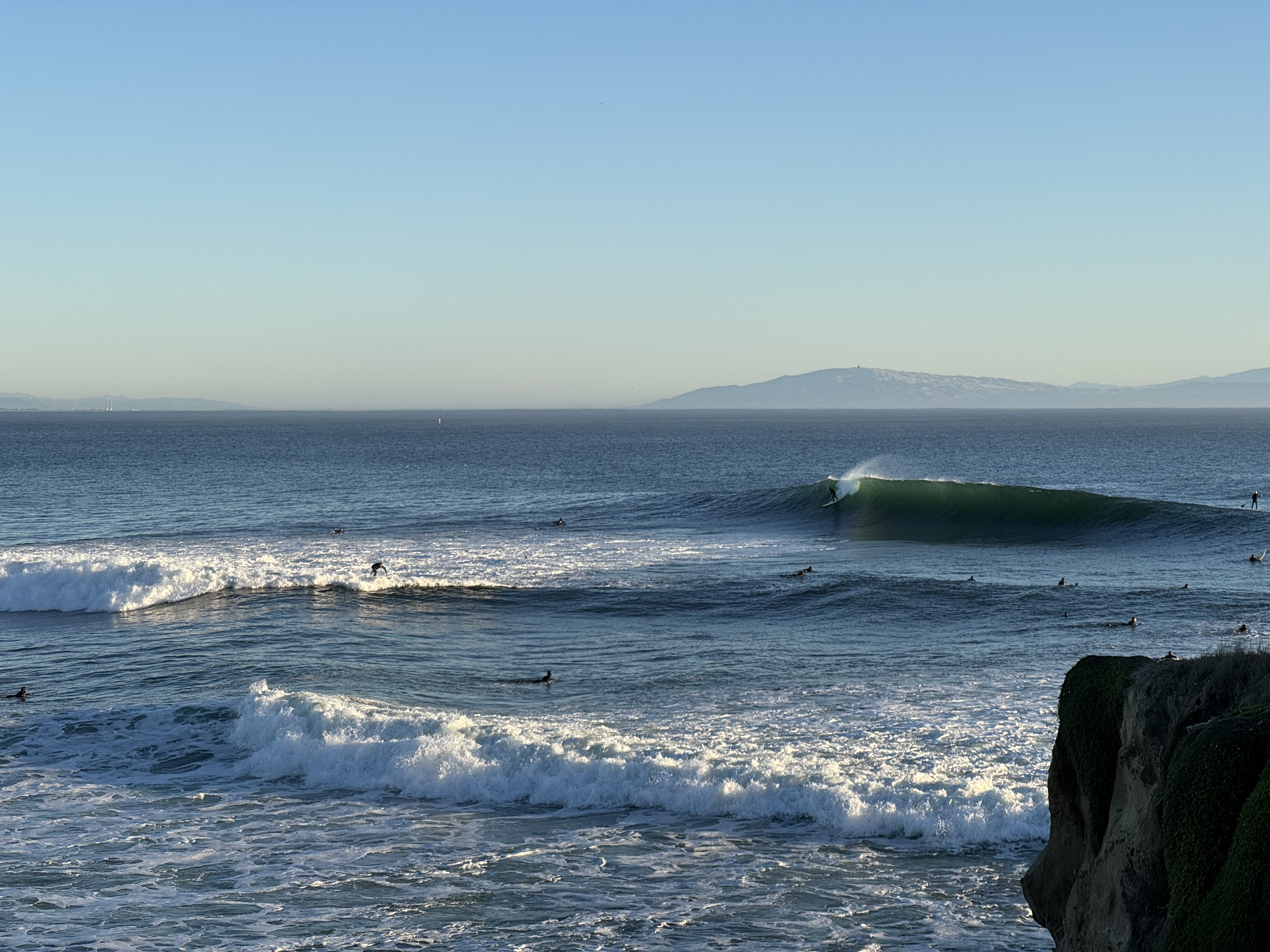
Hi-res picture of steamer lane.

== Santa Cruz and surfing ==
Santa Cruz has 11 surf breaks, including the point breaks over rock bottoms near Steamer Lane and Pleasure Point. Home to the Santa Cruz Surfing Museum at Steamer Lane, which continues to be staffed by docents from the Santa Cruz Surfing Club who have surfed Santa Cruz waves since the 1930s, Santa Cruz hosts several surf contests drawing international participants each year, including the O'Neill Cold Water Classic, the International Longboard Association contest, and many others. Santa Cruz is well known for watersports such as sailing, diving, swimming, paddling, and surfing. However, Steamer Lane has also seen animosity between local surfers and surf kayakers as the two groups seek to share waves.
