= Dorothy Becker =

American swimmer and surfer (1900–1989)

Dorothy Alden Becker
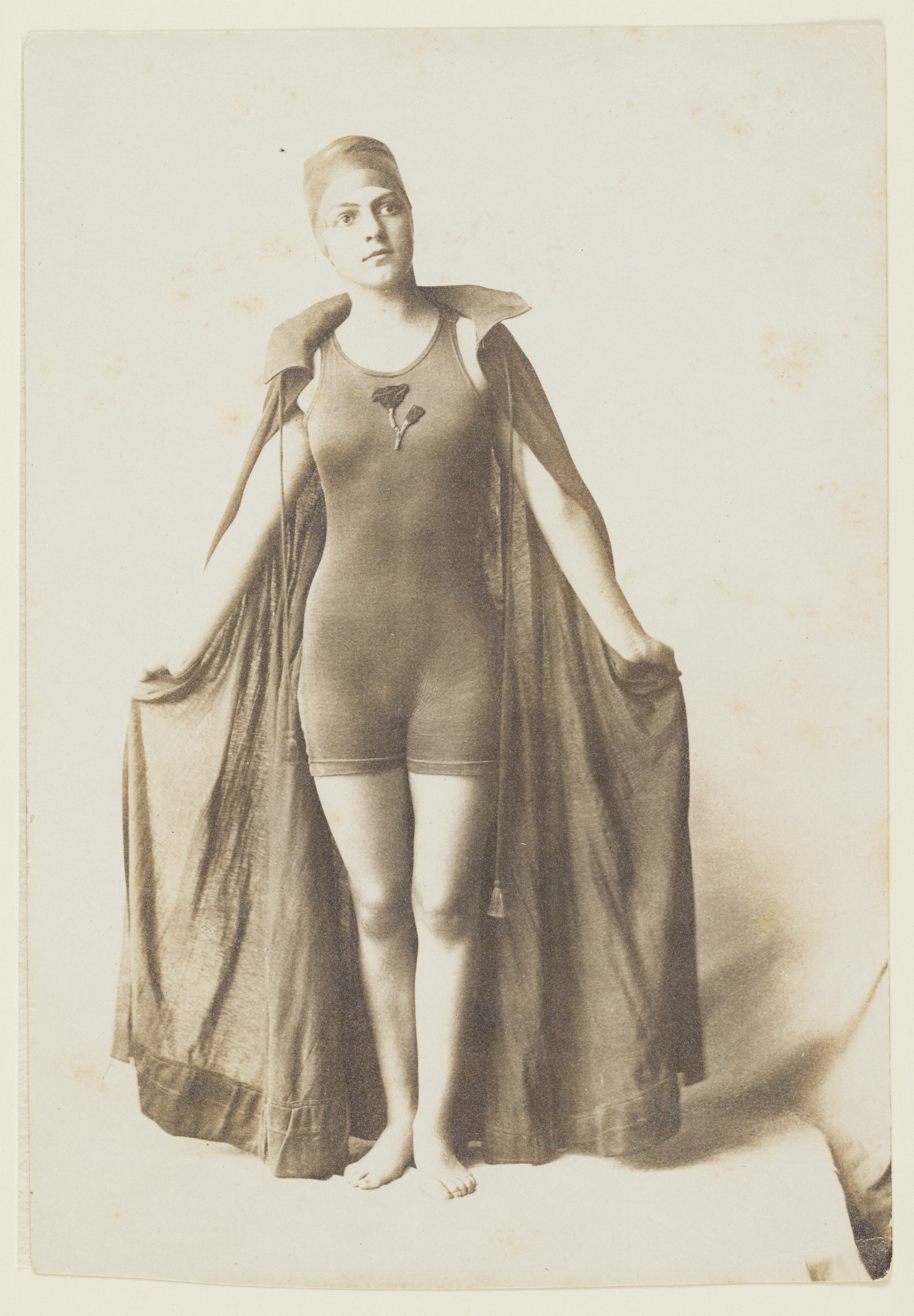
- Dorothy Becker

Personal information
- Born: 1900
- Died: 1989 (aged 88–89)

Surfing career
- Sport: Surfing
- Major achievements: pioneer, headstand for 75 yards

Dorothy Alden Becker Lineer (1900 – 1989) was an American surfer and competitive swimmer. Regarded as the first woman surfer from the mainland United States, she was better known as a swimmer during her era because surfing was a little-known sport on the mainland at the time. She was nicknamed the "California Mermaid."

Becker was born in Sitka, Alaska. Given a grim diagnosis by a doctor, her family moved her to Santa Cruz, California for a "nature cure" and set her on a strict regiment of exercise including swimming and diving.

== Voyage to Hawaii ==
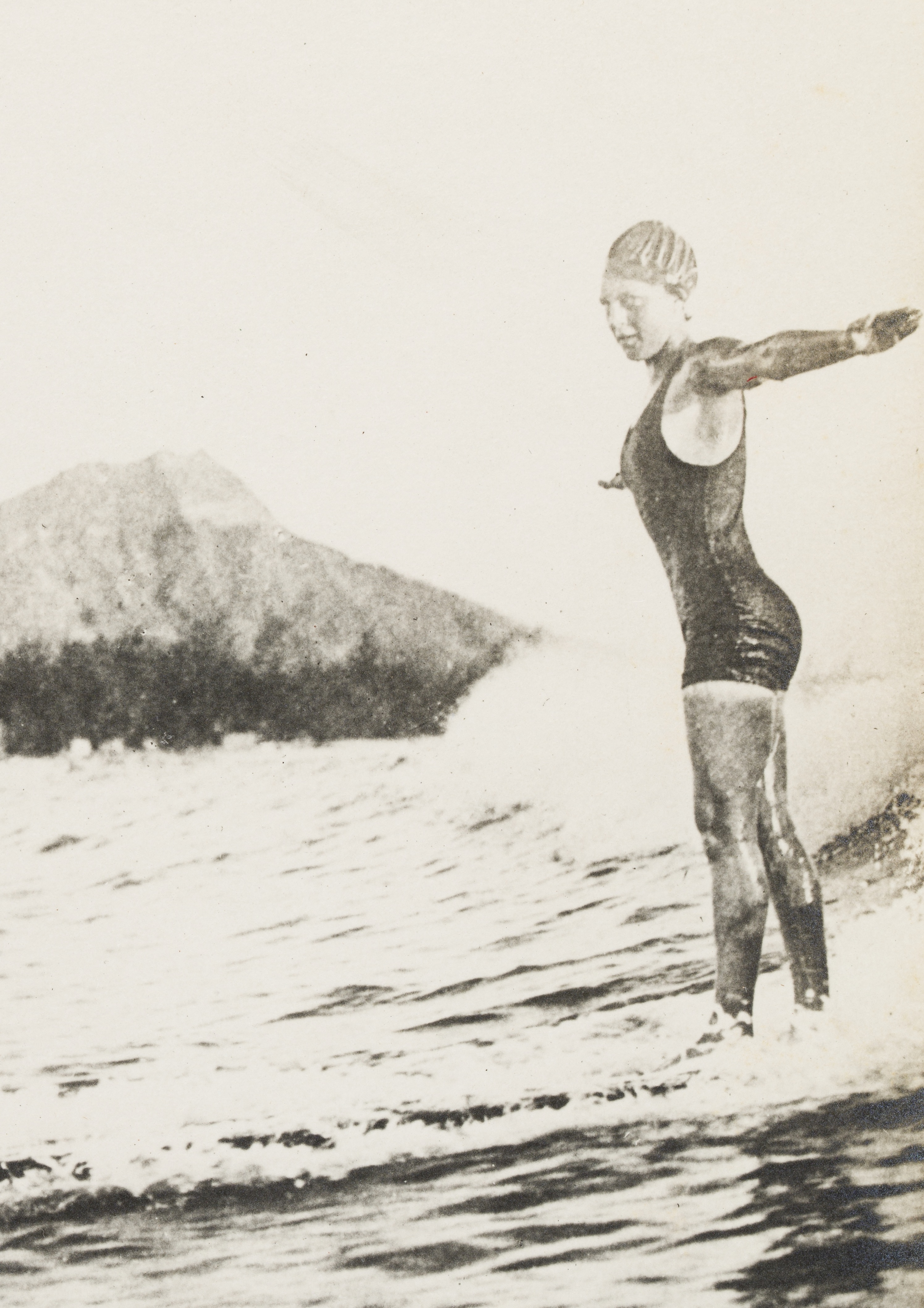
Becker surfing in Hawaii, 1915

She sailed to Honolulu in 1915, at the age of 15, to compete against champion American swimmer Ruth Stacker, who held the record of 50 yards in 31 seconds. During the race, Stacker accidentally entered Becker's swim lane. Both swimmers became confused; the race took 35 1/5 seconds, won by Becker.

While in Hawaii Becker "learned the trick of riding the surf boards" with a board she borrowed from swimmer and surfer Duke Kahanamoku. At this time, few people other than Pacific Islanders had learned to surf. Becker took to the sport quickly, surprising onlookers by performing a headstand on the board. Photos of Becker's tricks were published in the Chicago Tribune. The publicity introduced many Americans to the novel sport of "Waikiki surf-riding."

Returning from Hawaii, Becker brought her surfing skills back to her hometown of Santa Cruz, where a small surfing community already existed, started by Hawaiians in the 19th century. According to the Santa Cruz Sentinel she was first woman surfer from the mainland United States.

In a letter to Bernarr Macfadden, Becker credits exercise with saving her life from illness. She says her well-developed muscles allow her to surf 75 yards while standing on her head. The letter is one of the earliest known references to a woman using resistance training to improve her sports performance.

== Swimming accomplishments ==
Becker was the first woman to be a member of several athletic organizations, including the first in the Pacific Division of the Amateur Athletic Union. She resigned from the Pacific Athletic association in 1916 because of a dispute over a racing foul.

In a time when swimming garments for women were typically bulky, Becker defied convention by swimming in a form-fitting, knit suit. Her suit was similar to that of men of the era like Duke Kahanamoku.

=== Races won ===
Event	Time	Date	Location	Opponent(s)	Notes
50 yards	30 4/5 seconds	March 27, 1921	Neptune Beach	6 women	
100 yard breast stroke	1:39 1/5 seconds	June 19, 1920	Del Monte		

== Personal life ==
She married George Lineer
