= Pleasure Point, California =

Pleasure Point
- Census-designated place
- Position in California.
- Coordinates: 36°57′35″N 121°58′12″W
- Country: United States
- State: California
- County: Santa Cruz

Area
  - Total: 2.014 sq mi (5.216 km^{2})
  - Land: 0.749 sq mi (1.941 km^{2})
  - Water: 1.264 sq mi (3.274 km^{2}) 62.78%
- Elevation: 33 ft (10 m)

Population (2020)
  - Total: 5,821
  - Density: 7,767/sq mi (2,999/km^{2})
- Time zone: UTC-8 (Pacific (PST))
  - Summer (DST): UTC-7 (PDT)
- GNIS feature ID: 2408992

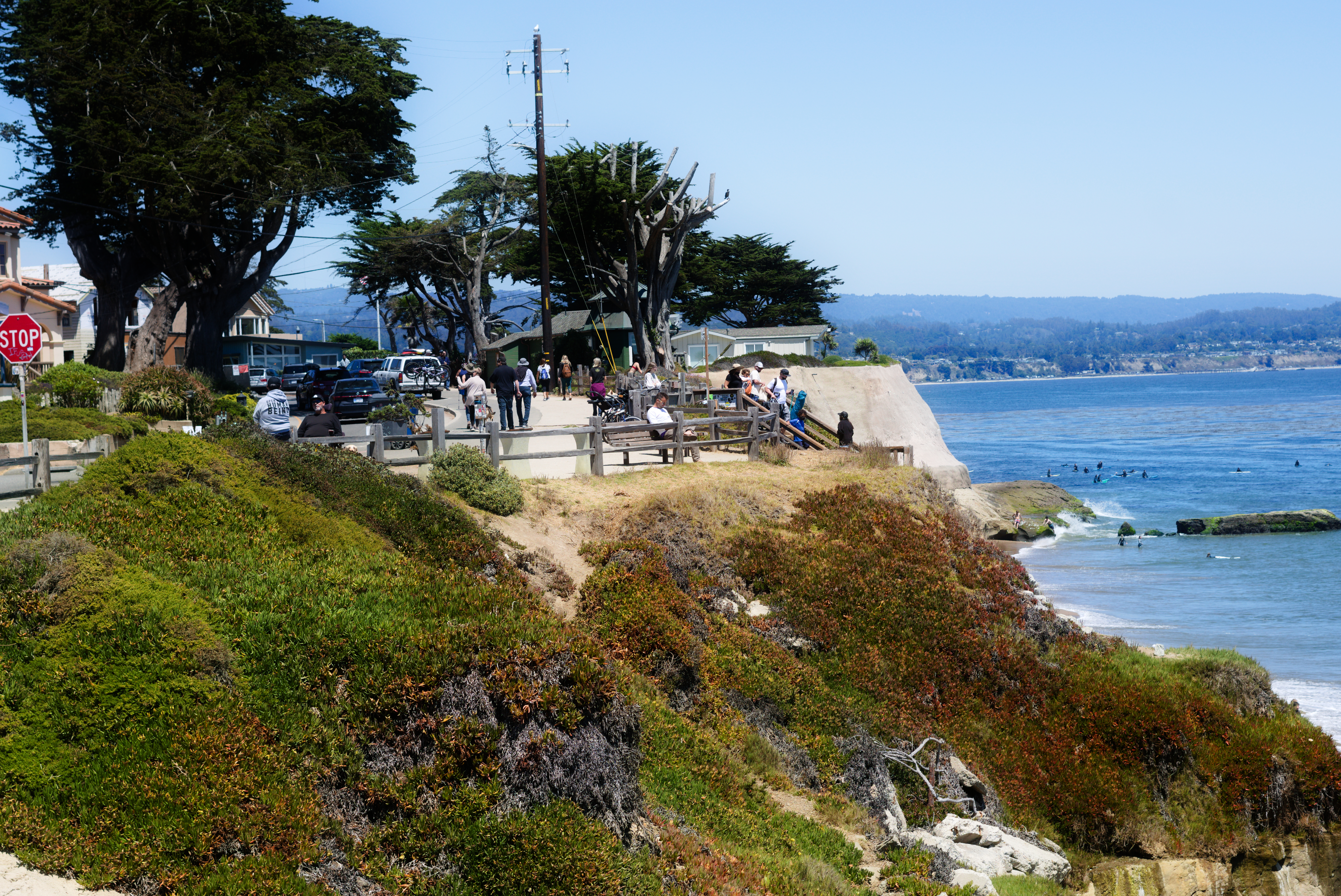
Pleasure Point in 2021

Pleasure Point is a census-designated place (CDP) in Santa Cruz County, California, United States. Pleasure Point sits at an elevation of 33 feet (10 m). The 2020 United States census reported Pleasure Point's population was 5,821. Prior to the 2010 census, this CDP was called Opal Cliffs.

== Geography ==
According to the United States Census Bureau, the CDP covers an area of 2.0 square miles (5.2 km^{2}), of which 0.7 square mile (1.9 km^{2}) is land and 1.3 square miles (3.3 km^{2}) (62.78%) is water.

== Demographics ==
Historical population
Census	Pop.	Note	%±
1960	3,825		—
1970	5,425		41.8%
1980	5,401		−0.4%
1990	5,940		10.0%
2020	5,821		—
U.S. Decennial Census; 1860–1870 1880-1890; 1900 1910 1920; 1930 1940 1950; 1960 1970 1980; 1990 2000 2010; 2020

The community first appeared as an unincorporated community under the name Opal Cliffs in the 1960 U.S. census; and then as a census-designated place in the 1980 United States census. The name was changed to Pleasure Point prior to the 2010 U.S. census.

=== Racial and ethnic composition ===
Pleasure Point CDP, California – Racial and ethnic composition Note: the US Census treats Hispanic/Latino as an ethnic category. This table excludes Latinos from the racial categories and assigns them to a separate category. Hispanics/Latinos may be of any race.
Race / Ethnicity (NH = Non-Hispanic)	Pop 2000	Pop 2010	Pop 2020	% 2000	% 2010	% 2020
White alone (NH)	5,177	4,314	3,940	80.16%	73.79%	67.69%
Black or African American alone (NH)	59	47	36	0.91%	0.80%	0.62%
Native American or Alaska Native alone (NH)	40	29	17	0.62%	0.50%	0.29%
Asian alone (NH)	138	136	143	2.14%	2.33%	2.46%
Native Hawaiian or Pacific Islander alone (NH)	9	5	13	0.14%	0.09%	0.22%
Other race alone (NH)	27	22	43	0.42%	0.38%	0.74%
Mixed race or Multiracial (NH)	200	153	342	3.10%	2.62%	5.88%
Hispanic or Latino (any race)	808	1,140	1,287	12.51%	19.50%	22.11%
Total	6,458	5,846	5,821	100.00%	100.00%	100.00%

=== 2020 census ===
As of the 2020 census, Pleasure Point had a population of 5,821. The population density was 7,761.3 inhabitants per square mile (2,996.7/km^{2}).

The census reported that 99.6% of the population lived in households, 0.4% lived in non-institutionalized group quarters, and no one was institutionalized. 100.0% of residents lived in urban areas, while 0.0% lived in rural areas.

There were 2,572 households, out of which 21.9% included children under the age of 18, 39.2% were married-couple households, 10.4% were cohabiting couple households, 27.1% had a female householder with no spouse or partner present, and 23.4% had a male householder with no spouse or partner present. 32.5% of households were one person, and 14.6% were one person aged 65 or older. The average household size was 2.25. There were 1,407 families (54.7% of all households).

The age distribution was 16.1% under the age of 18, 6.7% aged 18 to 24, 28.5% aged 25 to 44, 29.6% aged 45 to 64, and 19.2% who were 65 years of age or older. The median age was 43.8 years. For every 100 females, there were 99.7 males, and for every 100 females age 18 and over there were 99.3 males age 18 and over.

There were 3,056 housing units at an average density of 4,074.7 units per square mile (1,573.3 units/km^{2}). Of all housing units, 84.2% were occupied and 15.8% were vacant. Of occupied units, 55.2% were owner-occupied, and 44.8% were occupied by renters. The homeowner vacancy rate was 1.6% and the rental vacancy rate was 5.2%.

== Culture and history ==
Pleasure Point, on the northern Monterey Bay in Santa Cruz County, California, is a well-known surf location, traditionally defined as the area along the coast from 41st Ave to Moran Lagoon, up 30th Ave to Portola and over to 41st Ave down to the sea at the "Hook". It has a firmly rooted surf culture.

=== Early history ===
The Ohlone were the early inhabitants of the Central Coast, prior to the arrival of the Spaniards in 1769. The Spanish sent missionaries to introduce indigenous people to Christianity. The Spanish missions held onto their land and power for twelve years after the independence of Mexico from Spain in 1821. The Mexican government seized the Mission lands and distributed it to a few powerful families, among them the Rodriguezes and the Arandas.

=== Mexican land grants ===
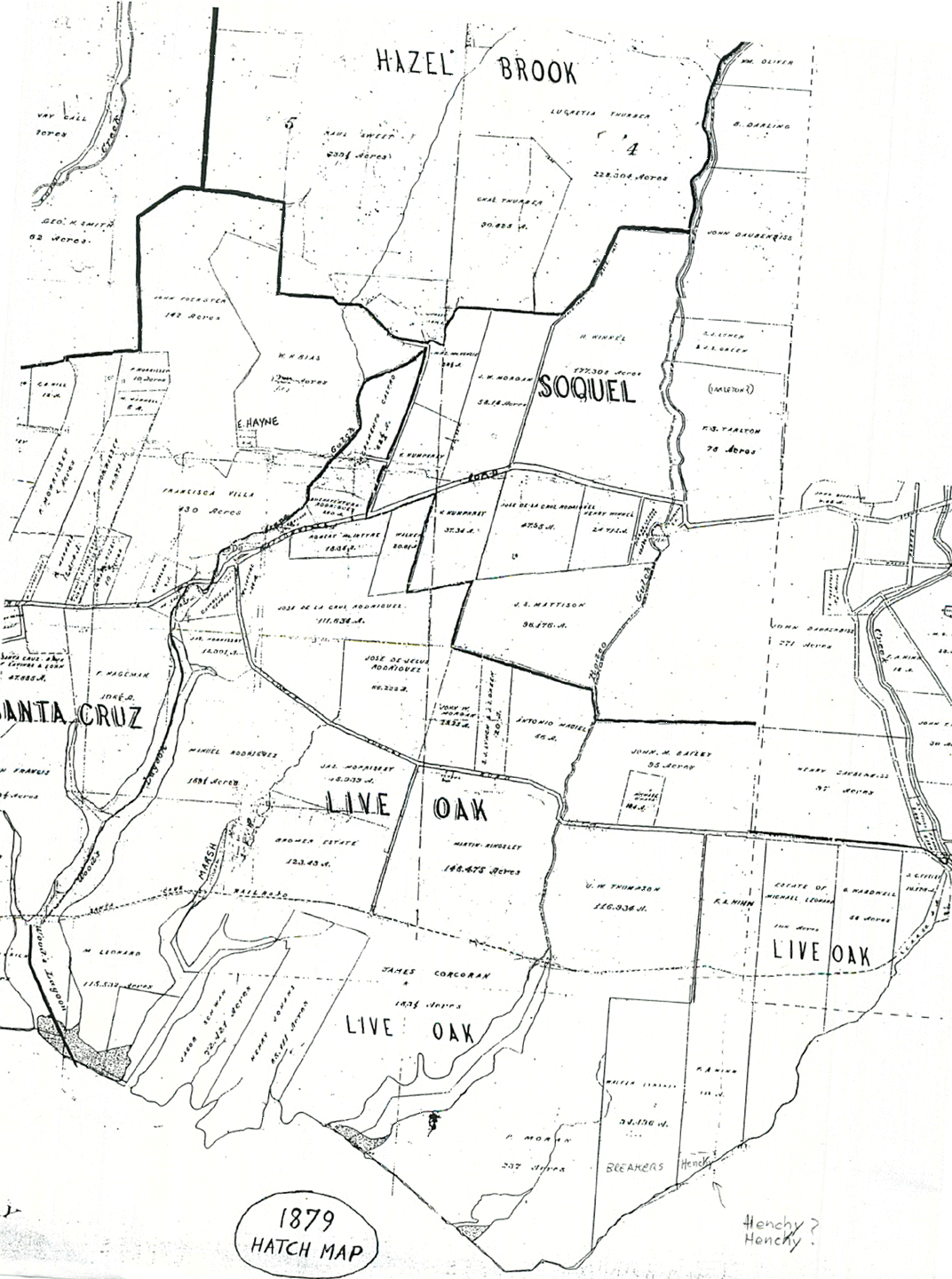

Rancho Arroyo del Rodeo was granted by Gov. Figueroa to Francisco Rodriguez. This area was used for cattle round ups by the Rodriguez and Castro families, in a natural amphitheater where the freeway crosses Rodeo Gulch. Also known as "Los Coyotes", a one-quarter square league from Rodeo Gulch to Soquel Creek, from the sea up. Rancho Encinalitos (little live oak ranch), owned by Alejandro Rodriguez, ran from Corcoran West and included the lands to Woods Lagoon.

=== Daubenbiss and Hames ===
The conclusion of the Mexican American War in 1850 resulted in more immigration. Americans and Europeans joined with the Mexican Rancho families or through purchase gained land in the area. In 1845 John Daubenbiss and John Hames bought 1,100 acres (4 km^{2}) from Alexander Rodriguez. The Daubenbiss house is on the rise coming out of Soquel Village. The 1855 grant was confirmed by the land commission. Originally surveyed as 2,353 acres (10 km^{2}) in 1858, it was resurveyed in 1861 as 1,473.04 acres (5.9612 km^{2}). In 1869, after a second notice they appealed yet were held to the smaller size because they didn't object in time. H. and E. Pagels patented part of the lands in 1868. Hames and Daubenbiss patented this Rancho in 1882.

=== Nineteenth century ===
- M. Leonard owned 115 acres (0.5 km^{2}) east of Woods Lagoon- The Yacht Harbor and Arena Gulch to Schwan Lagoon- the twin lakes area.
- Schwan owned 72 acres from Schwan Lagoon to near Blacks Point. He built the Inn in 1892. Helped develop Twin Lakes trolley station. Property landscaped by N.A. Beckwith with naturalistic landscape including eucalyptus.
- Henry Johans owned 85 acres from the Blacks Point and Sunny Cove area to 17th Ave.
- James Corcoran owned 183 acres of land west of Rodeo Gulch, from the Sea to Santa Maria, along the SCRR (Santa Cruz Rail Road) above the Schwan's and the Johan's lands, to upper Schwan Lake, the state park area by the Simpkin swim center of 17th Ave.
- Moran Patrick Moran and Rosa Smith 1866. Blacksmith in 1870 bought 237 acres of land from Rodeo Gulch/ Corcoran Lagoon to 33rd Ave- Lynskey property. Both sides of Moran Lagoon. From the sea to the RR, including Soquel Point and Pleasure Point.

Barn on 26th, now in Advent / Pleasure Point Church. Ship, Helen Merrian Cap. Nelson, with cargo of telegraph poles wrecks off ranch. 1896 - Son Patrick, 17, died of typhoid. 1897 - Divorced due to drinking. Son, Martin, drowned off Blacks Point in Jan 1901. Victorian house on beach. Burned March 1901. 1906 - Son, Edward died from mistakenly drinking acid, at his grandfather's ranch in Watsonville. Died in 1904.

- Walter Lynskey owned 54 acres from 33 Ave to 38th. Died 1918 and land sold.
- W. Hawes 1907 owned land along proposed E Cliff.
- F. A. Hihn owned around 120 acres from 38th to 41st the sea to Capitola Road. This included the Road House/ Casa Del Mar, on E. Cliff
- 1876 narrow gauge railroad from SC to Watsonville built by Hihn, whose locomotive Jupiter is in the Smithsonian.
- M. Leonard owned 108 more acres The Hook to Capitola Road, Opal Cliffs.
- G Wardwell owned 58 acres to Capitola Rd. Lower Opal cliffs.
- March 2, 1891, Corcoran, Moran and Johann gave 20 acres (81,000 m^{2}) to the Catholic Ladies' Aid Society
- June 1892 Hotel Santa Maria Del Mar opened.

=== Twentieth century ===
- 1906 The Chapel opened.
- Moran sold to Nellie Houghton in 1904 in an estate sale on Rosa's death. She bid $2,500 in gold coins. Built a family house at the end of 30th called the Owls, because of the many owls in the area. Mr. A. D. Houghton was an engineering consultant to John D Rockefeller.

Children went to Santa Cruz high on the Capitola Street car. They planted the eucalyptus windbreak that still shelters the area now. They also provided over wintering for the monarch butterfly. The house burned on 12.14, 1915.

- 1920 Neillie owned 6.25 acres at the end of Houghton/30th Ave.
- 1929 John C. Kleist owned the property
- C Thompson developed the Pleasure Point subdivision.
- Dr Norman Sullivan renamed Eucalyptus Dr, Pleasure Point Dr.
- The Plunge was opened in 1934. The swimming pool was built in the basement of the Houghton home. 1934 managed by Mrs. Thompson. 1955 re opened by Edward Maloney. 1962 was removed because of a large crack.
- Trolley Union Traction Twin Lakes to Capitola 1903-05 - 1925
- 1907 East Cliff Dr proposed 15-mile (24 km) auto speedway from SC to Capitola. 75–100 feet wide.
- 1907 Lamb and Burton owned 44 acres from UT to proposed E Cliff-33rd-38th. The Breakers.
- 1920s had 17.5 acres that developed as The Breakers 1921 Breakers Bonanza Beach

LOTS $5 down, $5 mo. 75–90 ft. Free water to lot, golden Waukesha mineral water. Free beach, 2,000 ft (610 m). long. Free camping.

- Rodeo Club 1922 meet at Larsen house on 38th to improve E Cliff 26-41st.
- Beltz 1920 6 acres (24,000 m^{2}) off 30th

1929 70 acres Moran Lagoon to 38th 1948 Beltz Haven 38th-34th 1936 permission to develop water system around Breakers Beach 1938 seeks to lay water mains in Live Oak 1938 sued by Breakers for poor water.

- Birds fly into homes in Capitola and Pleasure Point. Alfred Hitchcock, reading of this, makes the movie, The Birds.
- Pleasure Point Night Fighters
- 1920s Volunteer firefighters to protect the Point from fires and rowdy crowds during Prohibition 1919–1933. At this time rumrunners dropped off on the beaches.

Rumor is that the Pleasure Point roadhouse 2-3905 E-Cliff was used in these endeavors.

- The Pleasure Point roadhouse had one of the early gas stations along the Santa Cruz coast. It was a retreat with access to the ducks and waterfowl that filled the lagoons and wetlands in the area. 1870s F. A. Hihn owned the property. 1900s was owned by J. Henchy, a saloon keeper from San Francisco, who built the Pleasure Point roadhouse.
- 1920Nick Neary from San Francisco owned the property.
- 1926 A&E Peterson traded for their grape ranch in Chowchilla.
- 1986 L Naslund
- Jack O'Neill of the wetsuit patented the name "Surf Shop" in SF 1952. Moved to SC in 1959, first to Cowells and then to 41st Ave in Pleasure Point.
- Gion v. City of Santa Cruz (Cal. 1970) The use of the beach from at least 1900 lead to dedication of property to public use and prescriptive rights
- O'Neill bought Gion property along the coast of Pleasure Point. Formerly Breakers Beach owned by Hawes. 33rd-38th
- The PPNF, Pleasure Point Night Fighters, was reconstituted in the 1950s.

As the contests between the surfers from Steamer Lane and Pleasure Point increased, the Pleasure Point Surfing Association reinvigorated the PPNF in the 1960s with the inspiration from Jim Phillip's, renowned surf art-skate artist under Harry Contie.

- PPNF began Pack Your Trash. In the 1970s Pack Your Trash Day's began as one of the first beach clean ups in response to visitors who had not learned to respect the ocean environment.
- 1980 The PPNF Park was planted across from Elizabeth's Market, the old Port O Call market for Breakers Beach.
- Many surfing contest are held in this location, including the No Cord Classic developed by Keven Cante, in response to the use of shock cords or surf cords, now called surf leashes. The early version was attached to the board with a suction cup.
- 1970s Development of 41st Ave as a commercial district. Pleasure Businesses followed.
- 1995 the road across from the Pleasure Point roadhouse failed. As a result, the one way road is all that remains.

=== 21st century ===
- 2001- The sidewalk on lower 30th was the beginning of the end of the surf community, where many lived in an environment similar to that found at the State Park of Crystal Cove.

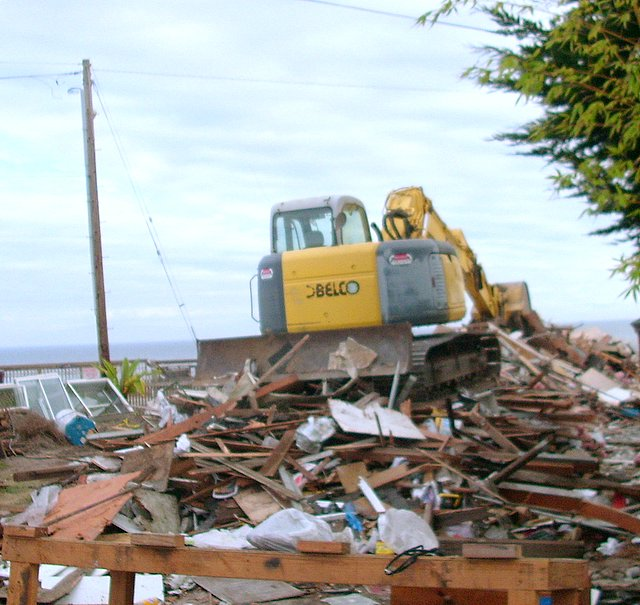

- With new "Curb Appeal", Realtors and developers rush in to replace the historic beach cottages with larger homes. Many long term renters left as vacation rentals and large houses used for a few weeks in the summer replace the small bungalows with cottage gardens. The pattern seen in Ocean Beach, San Diego, California and many Southern California beach cottage communities begins to transform one of the last surf communities along the coast.
- 2001 Park designation for openspace on the S-Turn
- 2001 The Rodgers project is opposed with a petition signed by a 1000 people against loss of small beach cottage used by surf community and removal of trees that protect monarch butterflies of Moran lagoon.
- 2002 Becomes a sanctuary for ducks, herons, and other waterfowl after local concern.
- 2003 Seawall proposed, but turned down by the California Coastal Commission because of a lack of consideration of alternatives to fight coastal erosion.
- 2004 Proposal to have a lower pathway along East Cliff by Coastal Commission.
- 2004 permission to build on the beach across from Moran Lagoon turned down
- 2004-Permission to build town house next to Roadhouse, on one of the last undeveloped lots. Though out of compliance with Neighborhood compatibility standards for similar scale, bulk and style to the surrounding homes; the project is approved much to the dismay of many long-term members of the community.
- 2005- Attempt to list The Pleasure Point roadhouse as a Cultural Resource NR-5. The trustees, with the help of realtors and developers fight the designation in opposition the community desire to save it for a museum and community center.
- 2007 community meetings to decide design guidelines in keeping with the historic beach cottage environment.
- Aug 14, 2007 County investigates Roadhouse as a park site
- Dec 2007 Coastal Commission permits Sea Wall from 33rd Ave to 36th and at the Hook on the end of 41st Ave.
- Aug 2012 Construction finished on the Sea Wall and improved Pleasure Point Park, now with bathrooms, showers and picnic tables and garden. The Dirt Farm has also been modified to handle more parking, though most of it is left as it was, including the bench.
- Sept 2015 The walk along East Cliff Drive from 32nd Ave to 41st Ave has now become a destination for a variety of people. Locals pushing baby carriages, tourists enjoying the unobstructed views of the surfers performing graceful acrobatics or spectacular "wipe-outs," dog walkers with their leashed dogs investigating the "p-mail" along the split-rail fence, Older folks being invigorated by the soft sea breezes, and just friendly folks stopping to chat and admire the ocean. There is a separate bike lane for the bicyclists and skateboarders. The Pleasure Point Path is from 12 to 24 ft wide and has two kinds of walking surfaces, packed dirt and asphalt.

=== Surfing ===
The beach at O'Neill's has long been used for surf access and gathering. Directly in front of O'Neill's house is the surf break called "Insides" and next to it on the land is a dirt field called "The Dirt Farm". Jack is kind enough to let the community use the property for running local dogs off leash or surf contests sponsored by the (Dirtfarm surf club]. All contestants must use surf boards built before 1970 with no leashes and wear an item like O’Neill. Famous surfers, including WSL Surfer Reilly Stone, Peter Mel, Jay Moriarty, Adam Repogle, Chris Gallagher, Kieran Horn, Marcel Soros, Flea Virostko, Kevin Reed, Richard Schmidt, Tanner Beckett, Christiaan Bailey, CJ Nelson and Homer Hernard. The early big wave rider Fred Van Dyke and the inventor of the wetsuit, Jack O'Neill, are historic figures associated with this area.

Two more spots surfed in the early 1970s are Little Wind & Sea and 26th. Both are just west of Sewers, First Peak, Second Peak, and sometimes at 26th Avenue to 36th Ave.
