= Branciforte Adobe =

Historic house in California, United States

- U.S. National Register of Historic Places
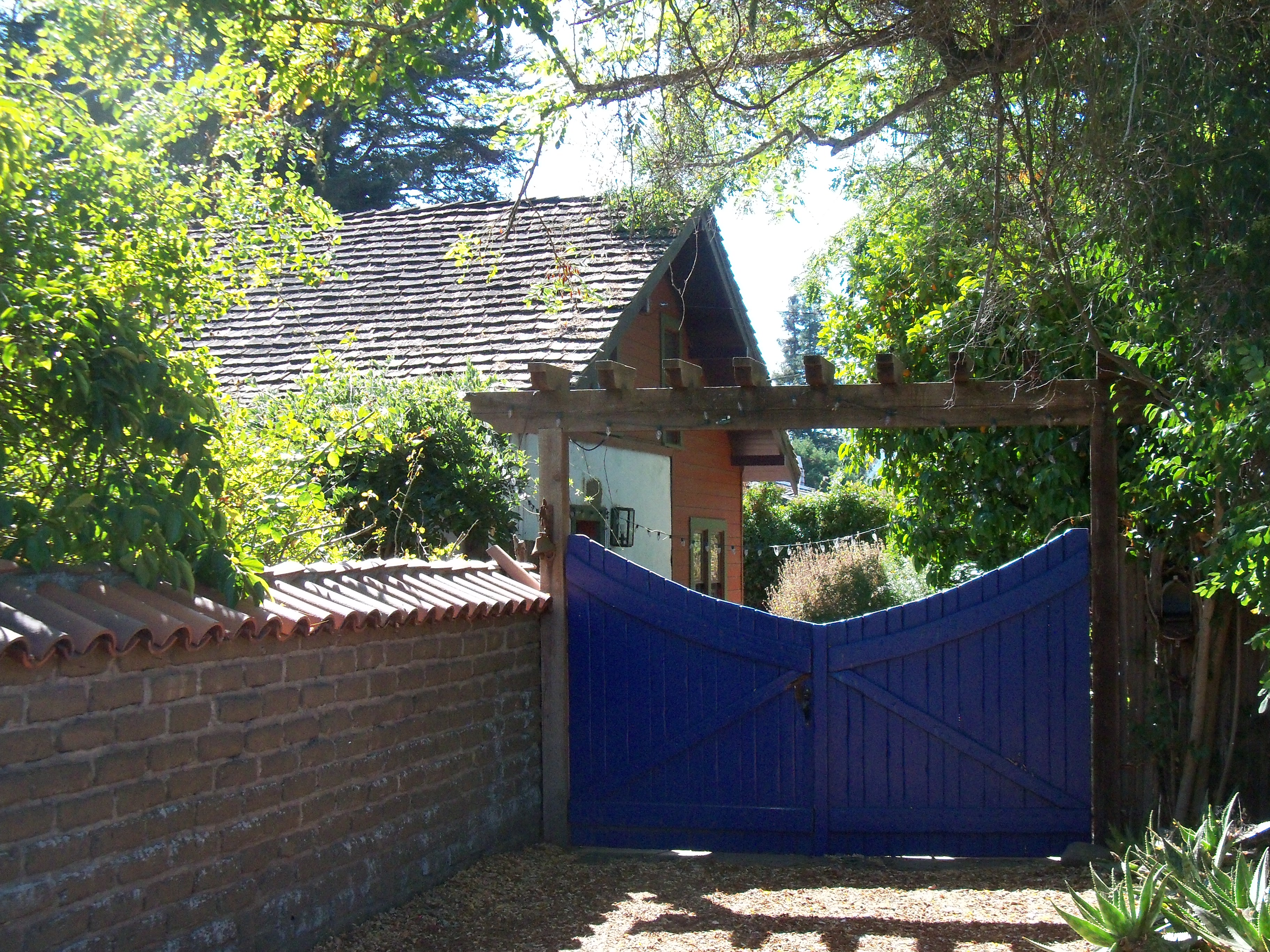
- Driveway on N. Branciforte Avenue; North face: 36.9898716°N 122.0108236°W

- Location within California Location within the United States
- Location: 1351 N. Branciforte Avenue, Santa Cruz, California
- Coordinates: 36°59′22″N 122°0′39″W
- Area: less than one acre
- Built: 1803
- Architectural style: Adobe
- NRHP reference No.: 79000552
- Added to NRHP: January 31, 1979

The Branciforte Adobe, also known as the Craig-Lorenzana Adobe, is the only remaining dwelling from the Villa de Branciforte, the settlement that was established in 1797 at the time of the Mission Santa Cruz.

The only remains from the settlement of the Villa de Branciforte is the two room Craig-Lorenzana Adobe which stands on the southwest corner of Branciforte and Goss Avenues in Santa Cruz. It is the oldest single-family dwelling in Santa Cruz.

== Description of structure ==
The Branciforte Adobe has 2-foot-thick (0.61 m) adobe mud plastered walls which are still remaining, a tile roof classic to the Spanish era later changed to redwood shake, and a veranda on the front rebuilt in the 1980s. The original adobe structure surviving from the Villa de Branciforte was one large rectangular room with two covered corridors (porches) on both length-wise sides of the house. The rear corridor ended adjacent to the fire pit and cooking area.

Over the years the house was modified many times; the most significant modifications were done by Jose Lorenzana in 1848. Lorenzana partitioned a small bedroom from the main room so that he and his wife could sleep separately from their reported 21 children. He "fancied up" the house adding doors, hinges, wallpaper and molding. Jose Lorenzana lived in the house until his death in 1863, ending the reign of Spanish inhabitants.

In the early 1870s Andrew Craig lived in the house. He became the district attorney and opened a law school in it. Craig was followed by the Winchester family who covered the adobe walls with redwood. After the Winchester family two men, Jim Hawley and Jim Hammond, resided in the Branciforte Adobe. They rebuilt the exterior and porch, and altered the roof to a redwood shake one.

== Restoration ==
"Branciforte Adobe was continuously inhabited since its construction and never unroofed, abandoned or moved. It is one of only two adobe structures left in the City of Santa Cruz and the only one remaining from the Villa de Branciforte."

The house was then bought in the 1970s by Edna Emerson Kimbro (née Cleave; June 25, 1948 – June 26, 2005), a bachelor of art history from the University of California, Santa Cruz, 1974, named Monterey District historian for the California Department of Parks and Recreation, and her husband, Joseph Rushton Kimbro (August 29, 1943 – June 30, 2011) who continued the restoration by stripping chicken wire and plaster from the exterior and restored the original adobe. This gave her the opportunity to examine the adobe and the wooden pieces used in the construction. At this point they added two additional bedrooms and two functional bathrooms. Edna Kimbro became very interested in preserving examples of early California History. She sold the Branciforte Adobe and moved on to restore the Castro Adobe, a two-story adobe in the Watsonville area which was built in the mid-19th century.

Edna Kimbro's work on the Branciforte Adobe was a very deliberate and detailed restoration which yielded information compatible with other classic adobe structures as well as revealing other unique characteristics. The Branciforte Adobe remains a private residence.
