= Santa Cruz, California =

City in California, United States

- City
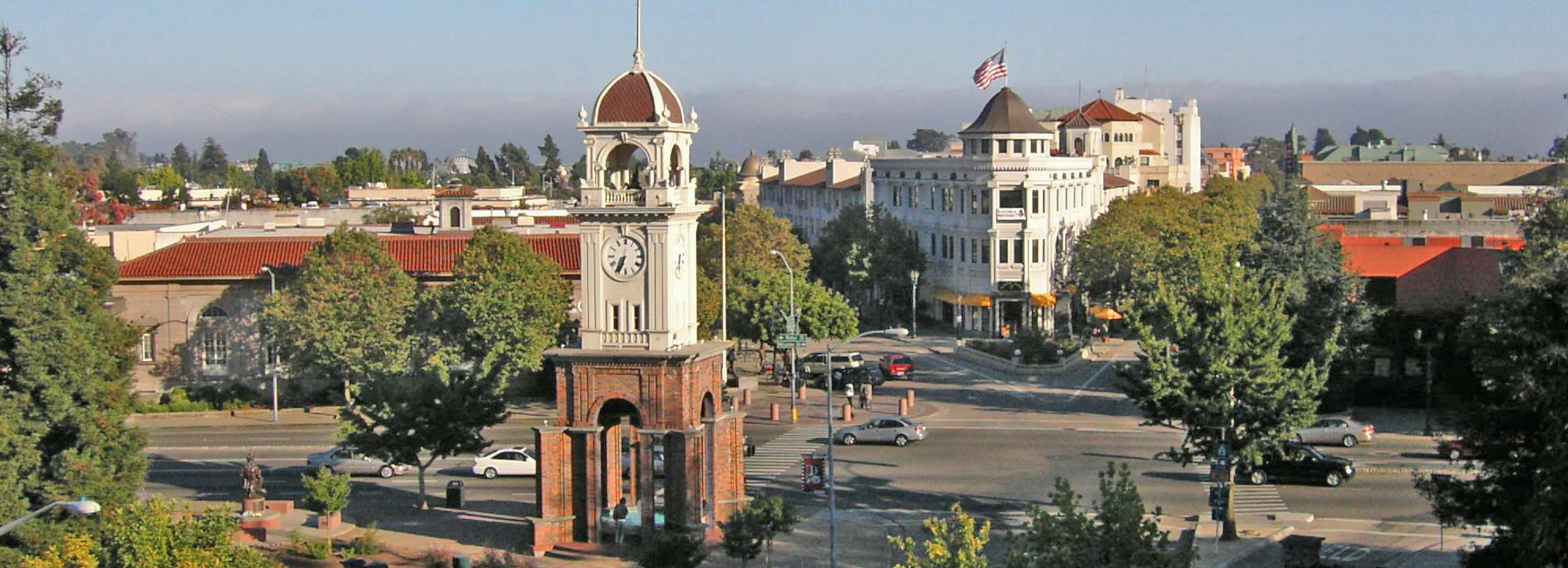
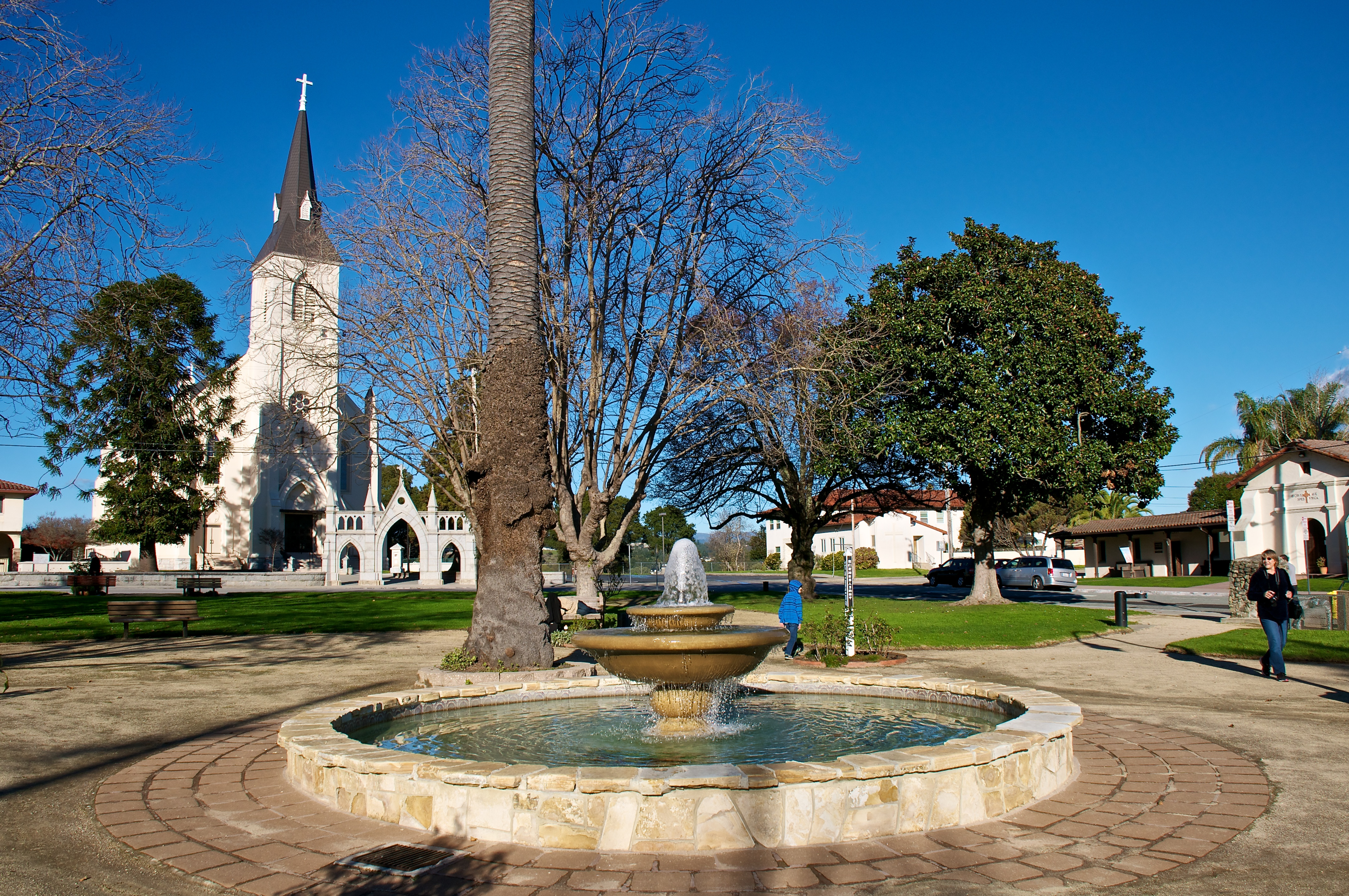
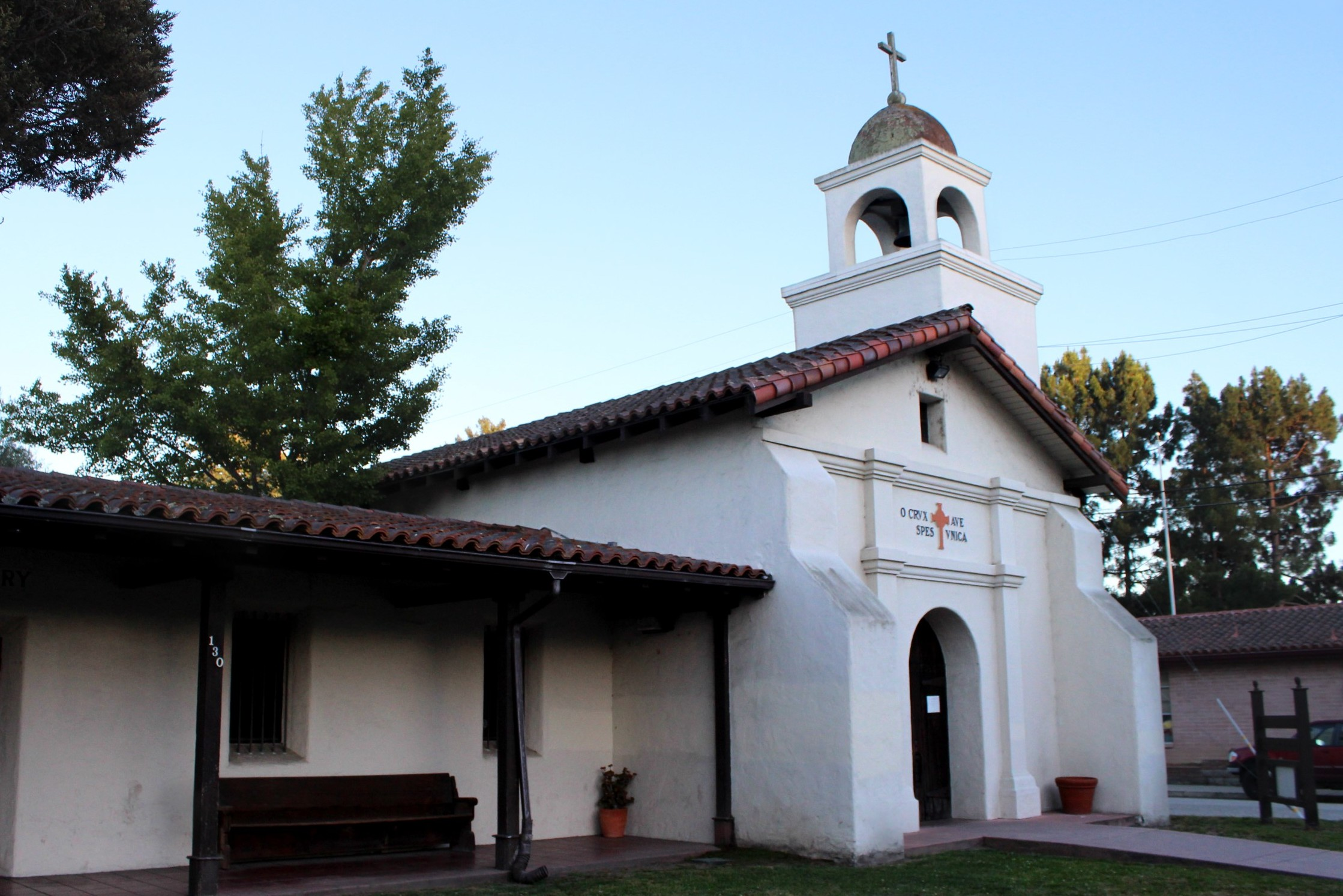
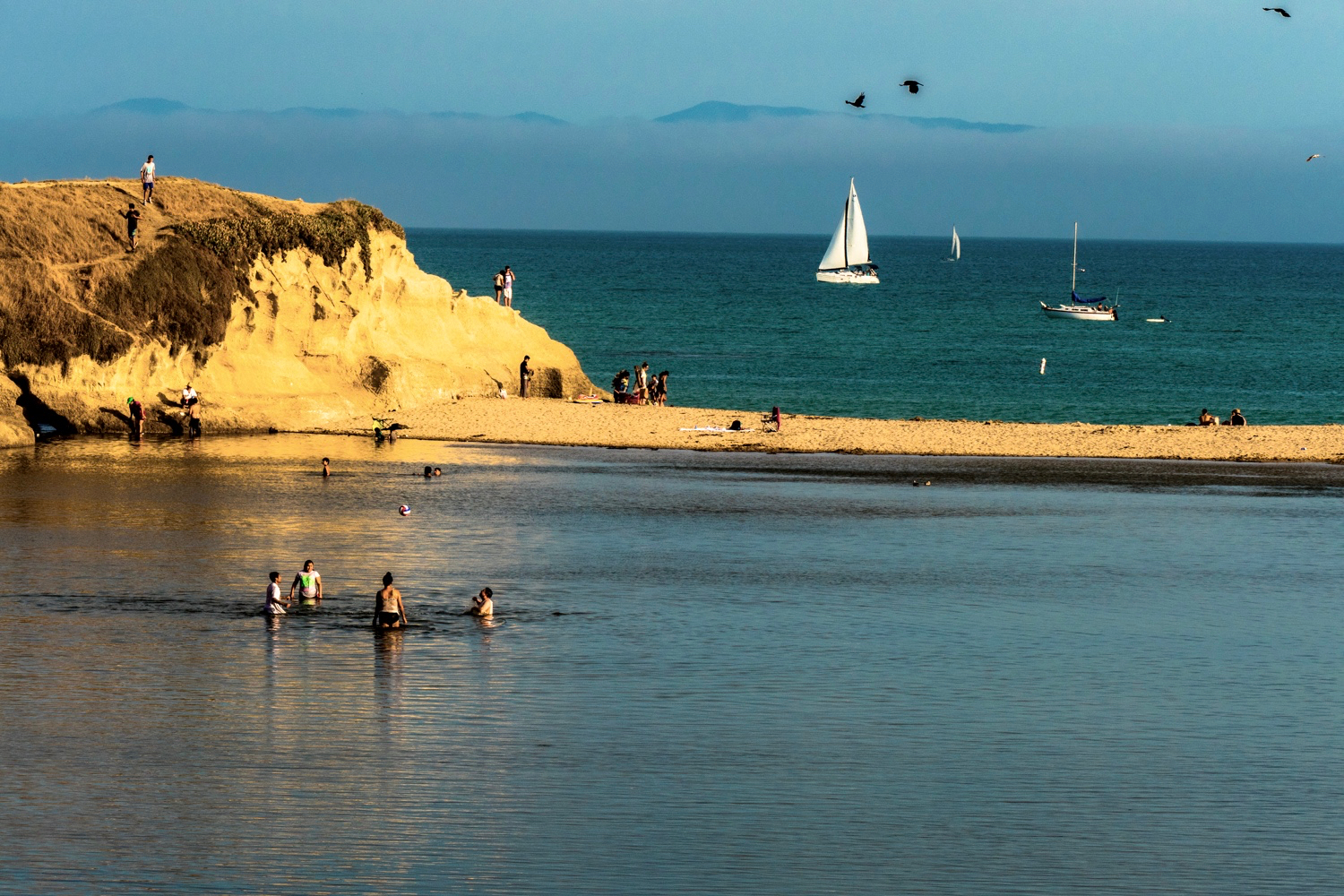
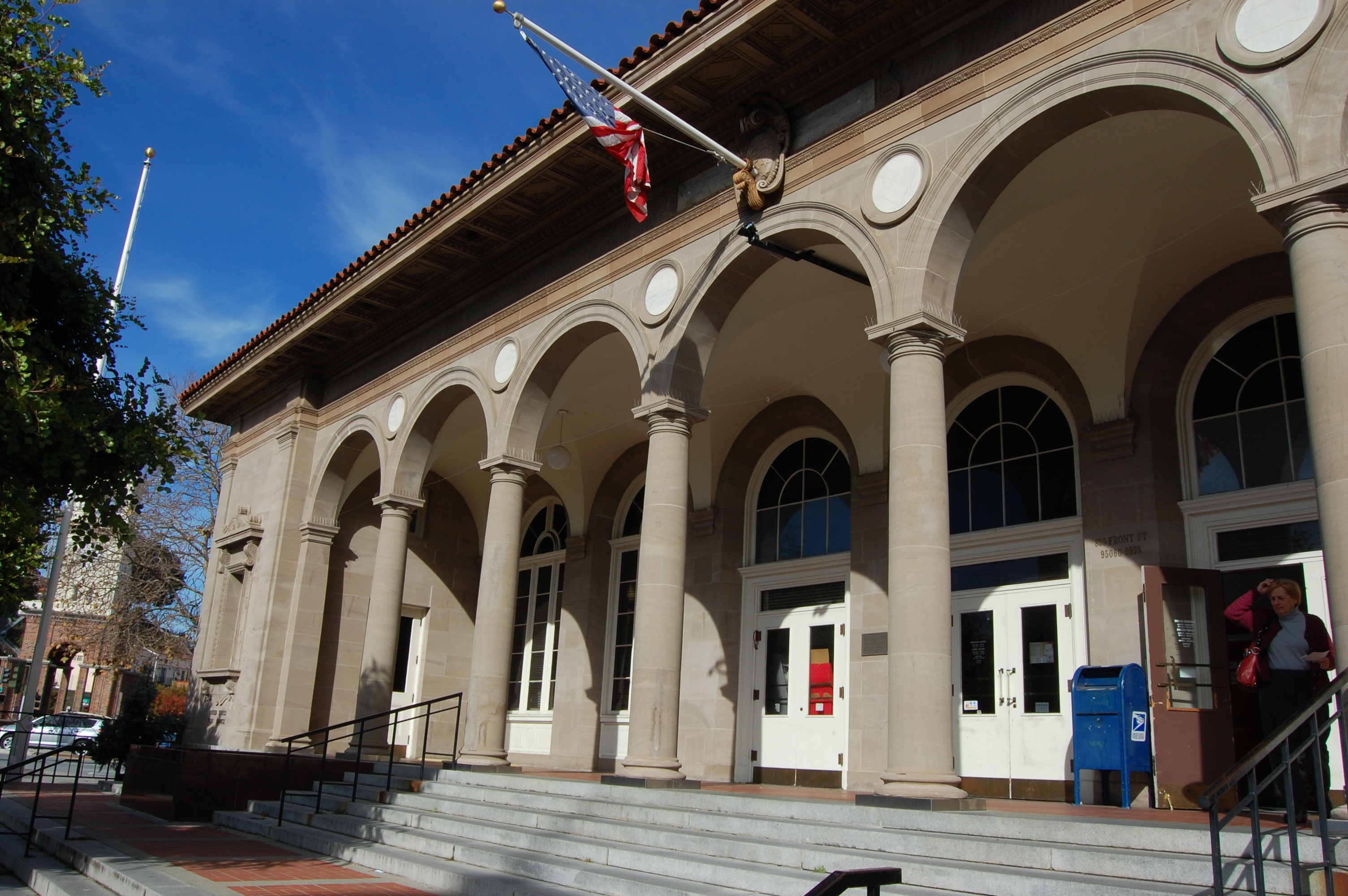
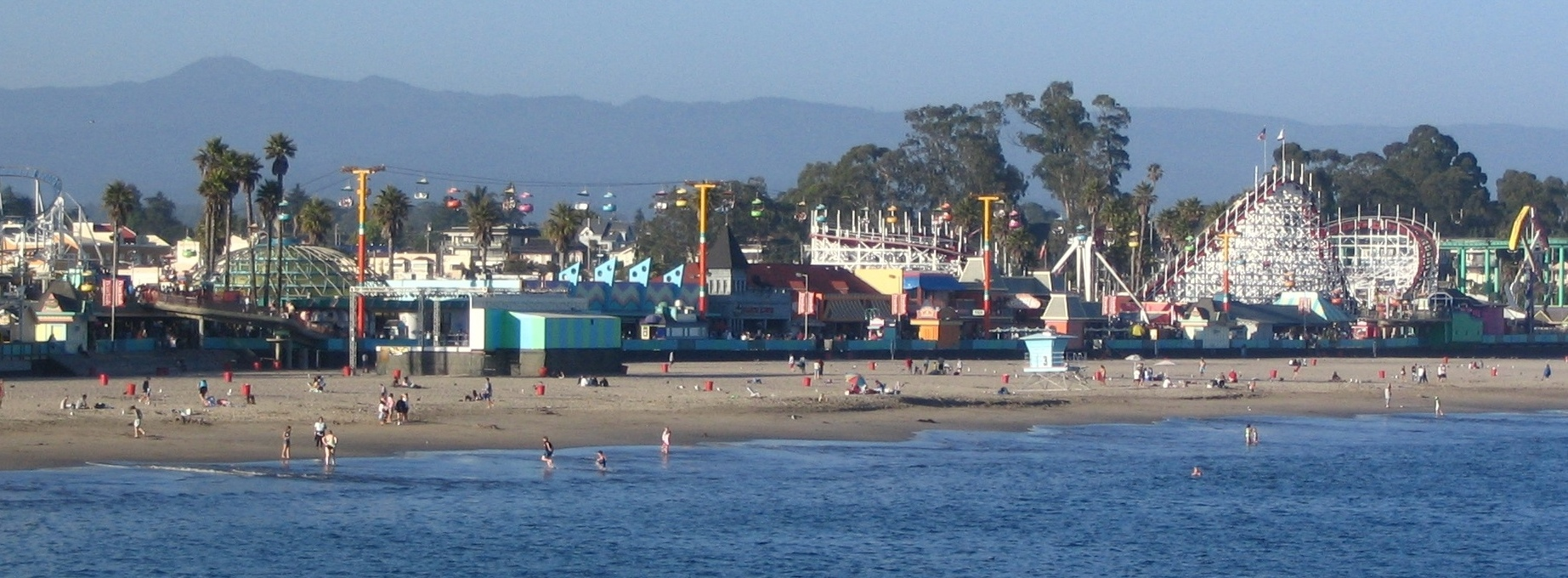
- Clockwise: Downtown Santa Cruz; Mission Santa Cruz; U.S. Post Office; Santa Cruz Beach Boardwalk; Seaside Beach; Mission Plaza.

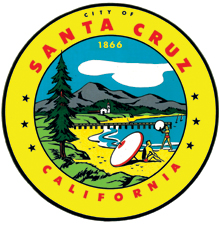
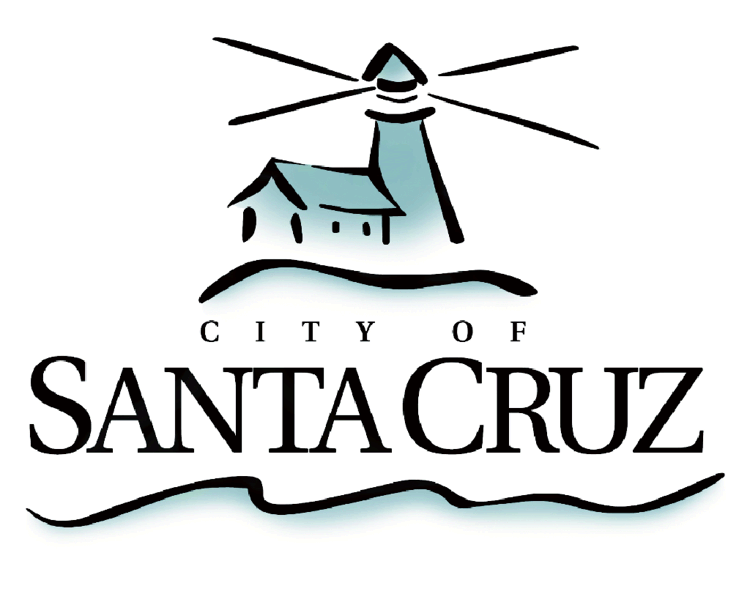
- Seal Logo
- Nickname: Surf City
- Interactive map of Santa Cruz, California
- Location within the United States
- Coordinates: 36°58′19″N 122°01′35″W
- Country: United States
- State: California
- County: Santa Cruz
- Mission: September 25, 1791
- Incorporated: March 31, 1866
- Chartered: April 1876

Government
  - Type: Council/Manager
  - Mayor: Fred Keeley
  - State senator: John Laird (D)
  - Assemblymember: Gail Pellerin (D)
  - U. S. Rep.: Jimmy Panetta (D)

Area
  - City: 15.83 sq mi (40.99 km^{2})
  - Land: 12.74 sq mi (33.00 km^{2})
  - Water: 3.09 sq mi (8.00 km^{2}) 19.51%
  - Urban: 58.3 sq mi (151.1 km^{2})
  - Metro: 607 sq mi (1,570 km^{2})
- Elevation: 36 ft (11 m)

Population (2020)
  - City: 62,956
  - Estimate (2024): 62,581
  - Density: 4,941/sq mi (1,908/km^{2})
  - Urban: 163,703
  - Metro: 262,382
- Time zone: UTC−08:00 (PST)
  - Summer (DST): UTC−07:00 (PDT)
- ZIP codes: 95060–95067
- Area code: 831
- FIPS code: 06-69112
- GNIS feature IDs: 1659596, 2411820
- Website: santacruzca.gov

Santa Cruz (Spanish pronunciation: [ˌsanta ˈkɾus]; Spanish for 'Holy Cross') is the largest city in, and the county seat of, Santa Cruz County, California, United States. As of the 2020 census, the city population was 62,956. Situated on the northern edge of Monterey Bay, Santa Cruz is a popular tourist destination, owing to its beaches, surf culture, and historic landmarks.

Santa Cruz was founded by the Spanish in 1791, when Fermín de Lasuén established Mission Santa Cruz. Soon after, a settlement grew up near the mission called Branciforte, which came to be known across Alta California for its lawlessness. With the Mexican secularization of the Californian missions in 1833, the former mission was divided and granted as rancho grants. Following the American Conquest of California and the admission of California as a U. S. state in 1850, Santa Cruz was incorporated as a town in 1866, and became a charter city in 1876. The completion of the South Pacific Coast Railroad in 1880 and the creation of the Santa Cruz Beach Boardwalk in 1904 solidified the city's status as a seaside resort community, while the establishment of the University of California, Santa Cruz, in 1965 made Santa Cruz a college town.

== History ==
=== Indigenous period ===
Indigenous people have been living in the Santa Cruz region for at least 12,000 years. Prior to the arrival of Spanish soldiers, missionaries and colonists in the late 18th century, the area was home to the Awaswas nation of Ohlone people, who lived in a territory stretching slightly north of Davenport to Rio Del Mar. The Awaswas tribe was made up of no more than 1,000 people and their language is now extinct. The only remnants of their spoken language are three local place names: Aptos, Soquel and Zayante; and the name of a native shellfish – abalone. At the time of colonization, the Indigenous people belonged to the Uypi tribe of the Awaswas-speaking dialectical group. They called the area Aulinta.

=== Spanish period ===
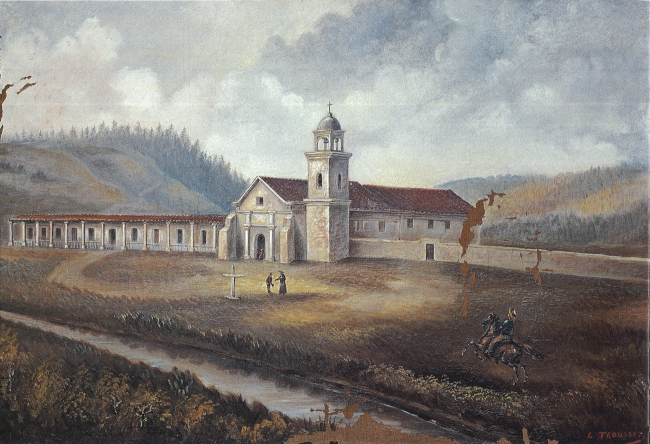
Santa Cruz was founded by the Spanish in 1791 when Fermín de Lasuén established Mission Santa Cruz.

The first European land exploration of Alta California, the Spanish Portolá expedition led by Gaspar de Portolá, passed through the area on its way north, still searching for the "port of Monterey" described by Sebastian Vizcaino in 1602. The party forded the river (probably near where the Soquel Avenue bridge now stands) and camped nearby on October 17, 1769. Franciscan missionary Juan Crespí, traveling with the expedition, noted in his diary that, "This river was named San Lorenzo." (for Saint Lawrence).

Next morning, the expedition set out again, and Crespi noted that, "Five hundred steps after we started we crossed a good arroyo of running water which descends from some high hills where it rises. It was named "El Arroyo de la Santísima Cruz, which translates literally as "The Stream of the Most Holy Cross".

In 1791, Father Fermín Lasuén continued the use of Crespi's name when he declared the establishment of La Misión de la Exaltación de la Santa Cruz (also known as Mission Santa Cruz) for the conversion of the Awaswas of Chatu-Mu and surrounding Ohlone villages. Santa Cruz was the twelfth mission to be founded in California. The creek, however, later lost the name, and is known today as Laurel Creek because it parallels Laurel Street. It is the main feeder of Neary Lagoon.

In 1797, Governor Diego de Borica, by order of the Viceroy of New Spain, Miguel de la Grúa Talamanca y Branciforte, marqués de Branciforte, established the Villa de Branciforte, a town named in honor of the Viceroy. One of only three civilian towns established in California during the Spanish colonial period (the other two became Los Angeles and San Jose), the Villa was located across the San Lorenzo River, less than a mile from the Mission. Its original main street is now North Branciforte Avenue. Villa de Branciforte later lost its civic status, and in 1905 the area was annexed into the City of Santa Cruz.

=== Mexican period ===
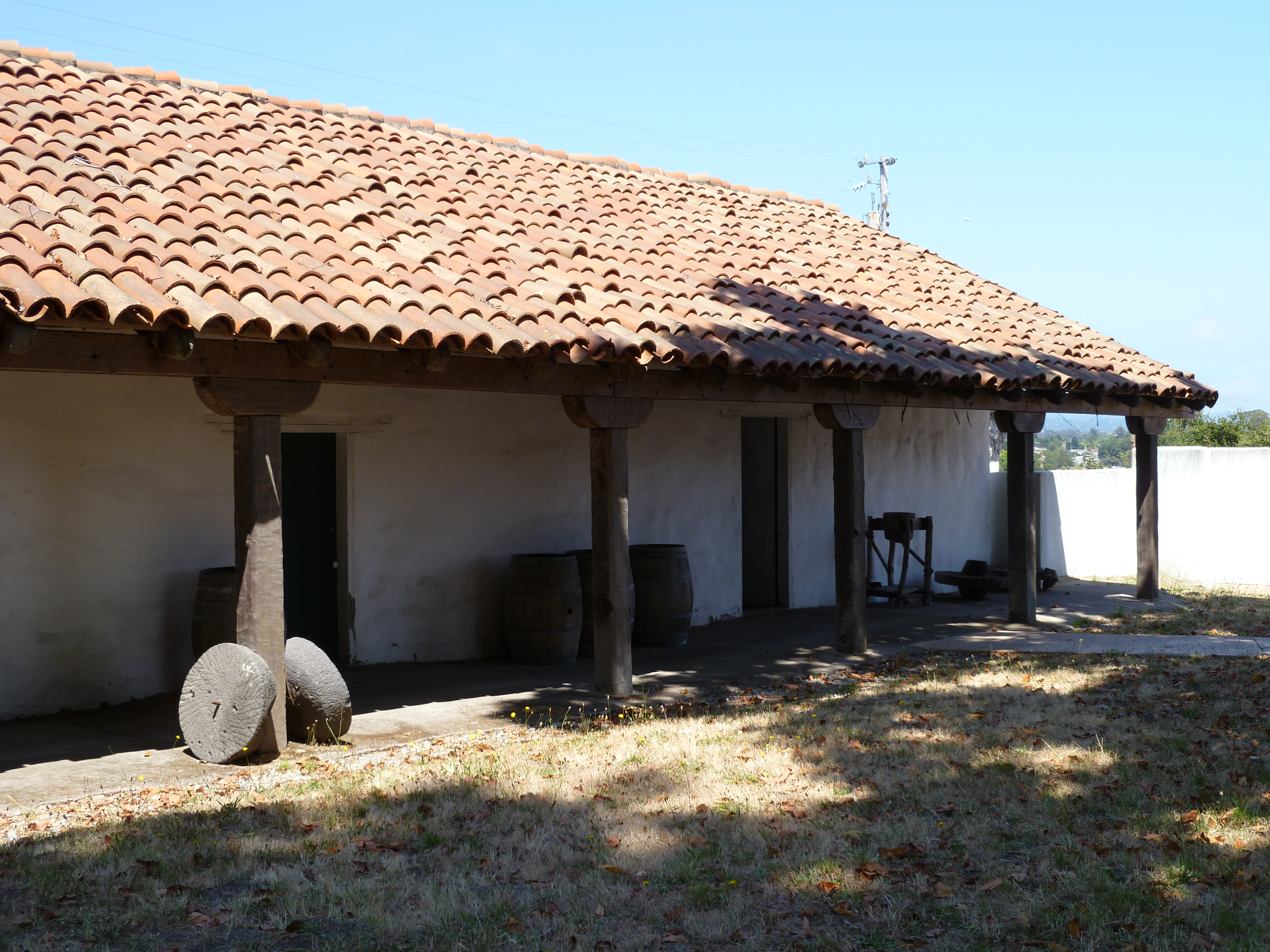
The Neary-Rodríguez Adobe, built c. 1810, is Santa Cruz's oldest building.

In the 1820s, newly independent Mexico assumed control of the area. Following the Mexican secularization act of 1833, governor Figueroa attempted to rename the community that had grown up around the mission after himself, to Pueblo de Figueroa. The pueblo designation was never made official, however. The new name did not catch on and Santa Cruz remained Santa Cruz.

The Santa Cruz mission, along with the rest of the twenty-one Alta California missions, was secularized within a few years after 1833. Even before secularization, the Native American population had declined. Following secularization, mission grazing lands, which once extended from the San Lorenzo River north along the coast to approximately today's Santa Cruz County border, were taken away and broken up into large land grants called ranchos. The grants were made by several different governors between 1834 and 1845 (see List of Ranchos of California).

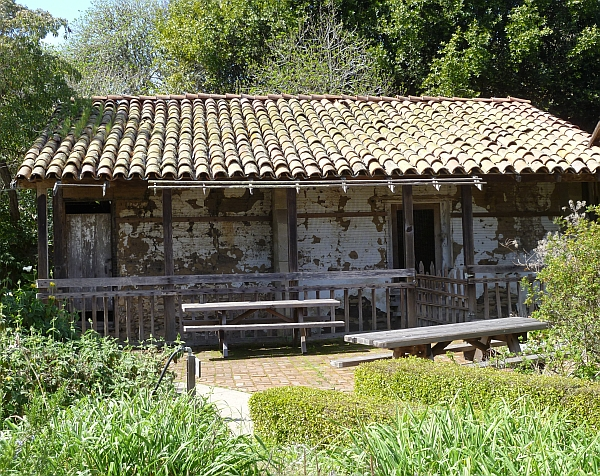
José Antonio Bolcoff, who served as alcalde (mayor) of Branciforte, built his adobe on Rancho Refugio in 1839.

Two ranchos were totally within the boundaries of today's city of Santa Cruz. Rancho Potrero Y Rincon de San Pedro Regalado consisted mostly of flat, river-bottom pasture land north of Mission Hill ("potrero" translates as "pasture"). Rancho Tres Ojos de Agua was on the west side. Three other rancho boundaries later became part of the modern city limits: Rancho Refugio on the west. Rancho Carbonera on the north, and Rancho Arroyo del Rodeo on the east.

After secularization put most California land into private hands, immigrants from the United States began to arrive in steadily increasing numbers, especially in the 1840s when overland routes like the California Trail were opened. In 1848, following the Mexican–American War, Mexico ceded the territory of Alta California to the U.S. in the Treaty of Guadalupe Hidalgo.

Demoted to a parish church, the former Santa Cruz mission was unable to maintain its building complex after secularization, and the adobe buildings slowly began to fall apart from wet weather and lack of maintenance. The chapel tower fell in 1840 and the entire front wall was destroyed in the 1857 Fort Tejon earthquake. In 1858 a "modern" church was built next door to the remaining rear portion of the chapel. That remainder was demolished in 1889, when today's Holy Cross church was built on the site, in a gothic style.

=== American period ===
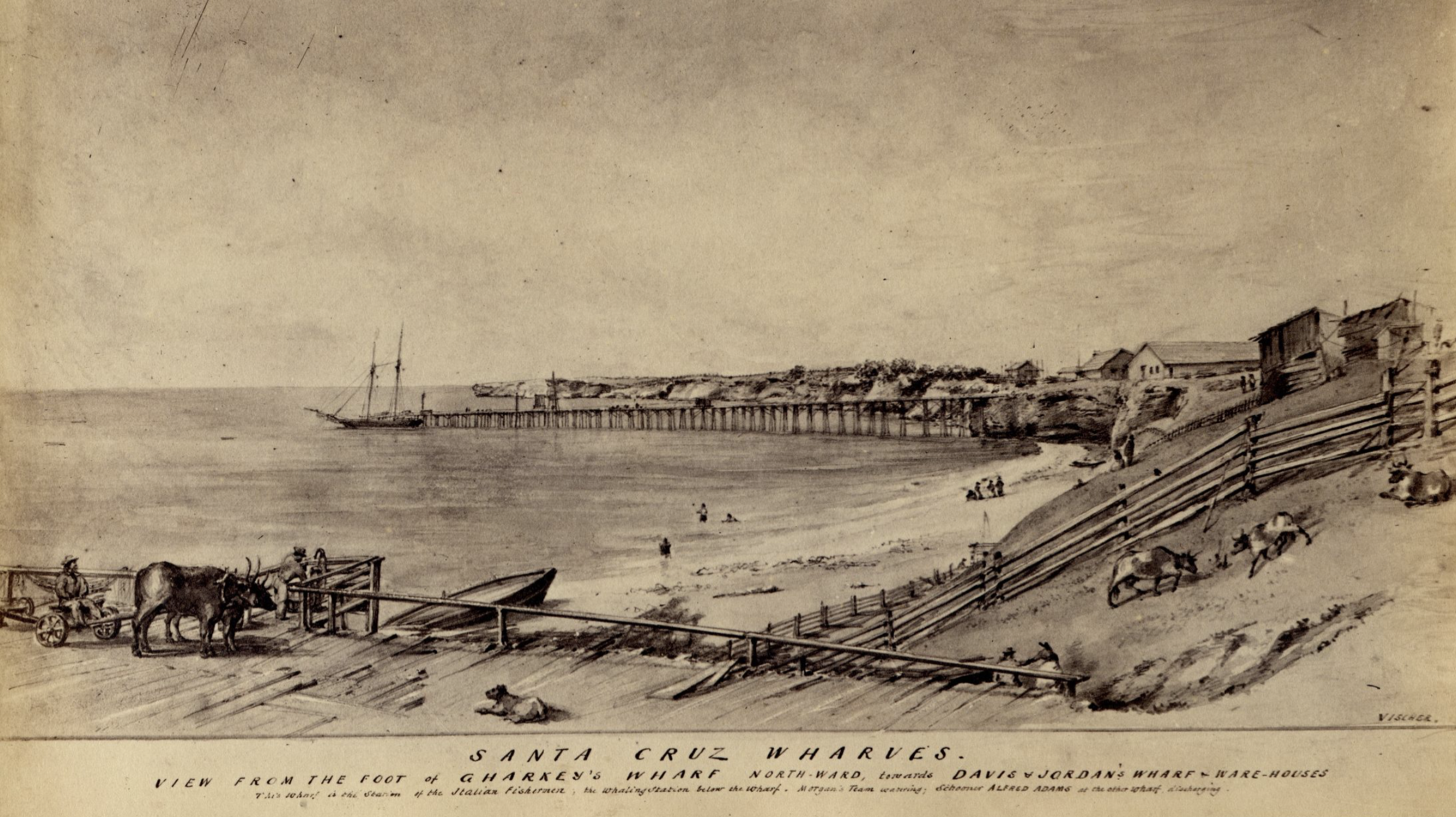
View of Santa Cruz's coastal wharves; Edward Vischer, 1863

California was the first portion of the former Mexican territory to become a state, in 1850. Santa Cruz County was established the same year, and Santa Cruz became the county seat. Santa Cruz was incorporated as a town in 1866, and became a charter city in 1876.

Following the U.S. Conquest of California, Santa Cruz steadily grew with the arrival of immigrants from the eastern United States. Elihu Anthony (1818–1905) arrived in Santa Cruz in 1847 and opened many firsts for the city, including the first Protestant Church and the first blacksmith foundry. He built the first wharf and was the first postmaster. He developed the first commercial blocks in downtown Santa Cruz with his early blacksmith foundry located at what is now the corner of Pacific Avenue and Mission Street. With Frederick A. Hihn, Anthony built the first private water supply network in the city and serving nearby communities.

The establishment of railroad lines in Santa Cruz in 1875–76 with the Santa Cruz & Felton Railroad and the Santa Cruz Railroad provided market access for the city's timber, leather and limestone industries.

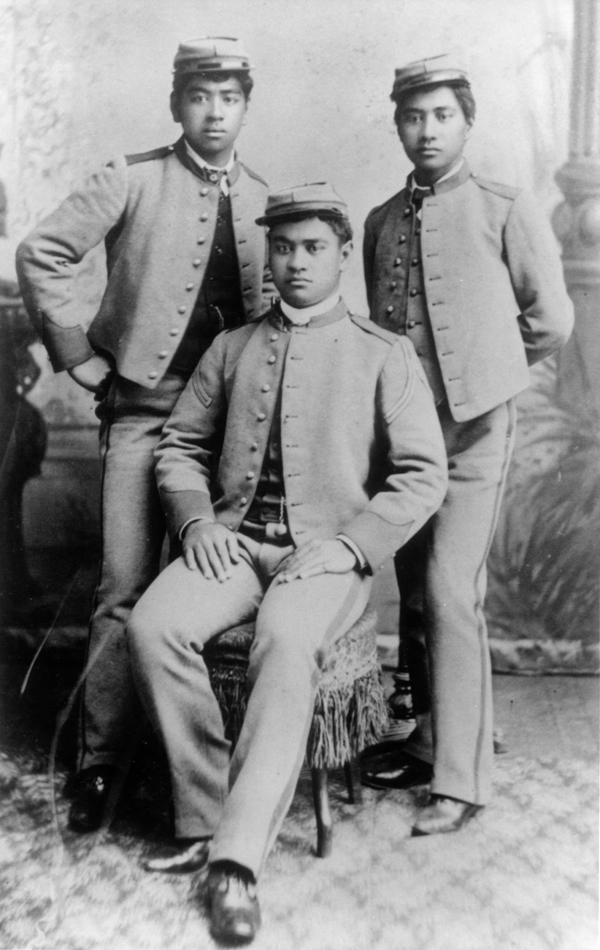
The Three Princes of Hawaii who introduced surfing to California in Santa Cruz, 1885: Jonah Kūhiō Kalanianaʻole (left), David Kawānanakoa (center), and Edward Abnel Keliʻiahonui (right)

California Powder Works began manufacturing blasting powder for California mining when normal supplies were interrupted by the American Civil War. The extensive complex built on the San Lorenzo River upstream of Santa Cruz used charcoal and powder kegs manufactured from local forests. The Works later manufactured smokeless powder used in United States Army Krag-Jørgensen rifles and guns of the United States Navy Pacific and Asiatic fleets.

Santa Cruz was hard hit by the 1989 Loma Prieta earthquake that killed three people. It was also hit by ocean surges caused by the 2011 Tōhoku earthquake and tsunami, wherein the Santa Cruz Small Craft Harbor sustained an estimated $10 million of damage, with another $5 million of damage to docked boats there. Following the earthquake, a former building chief urged the city government to consider relocating to a safer location with lower risk of damage from seismic activity. It was again hit by ocean surges caused by 2022 Hunga Tonga–Hunga Haʻapai eruption and tsunami, that caused damages to the harbor.

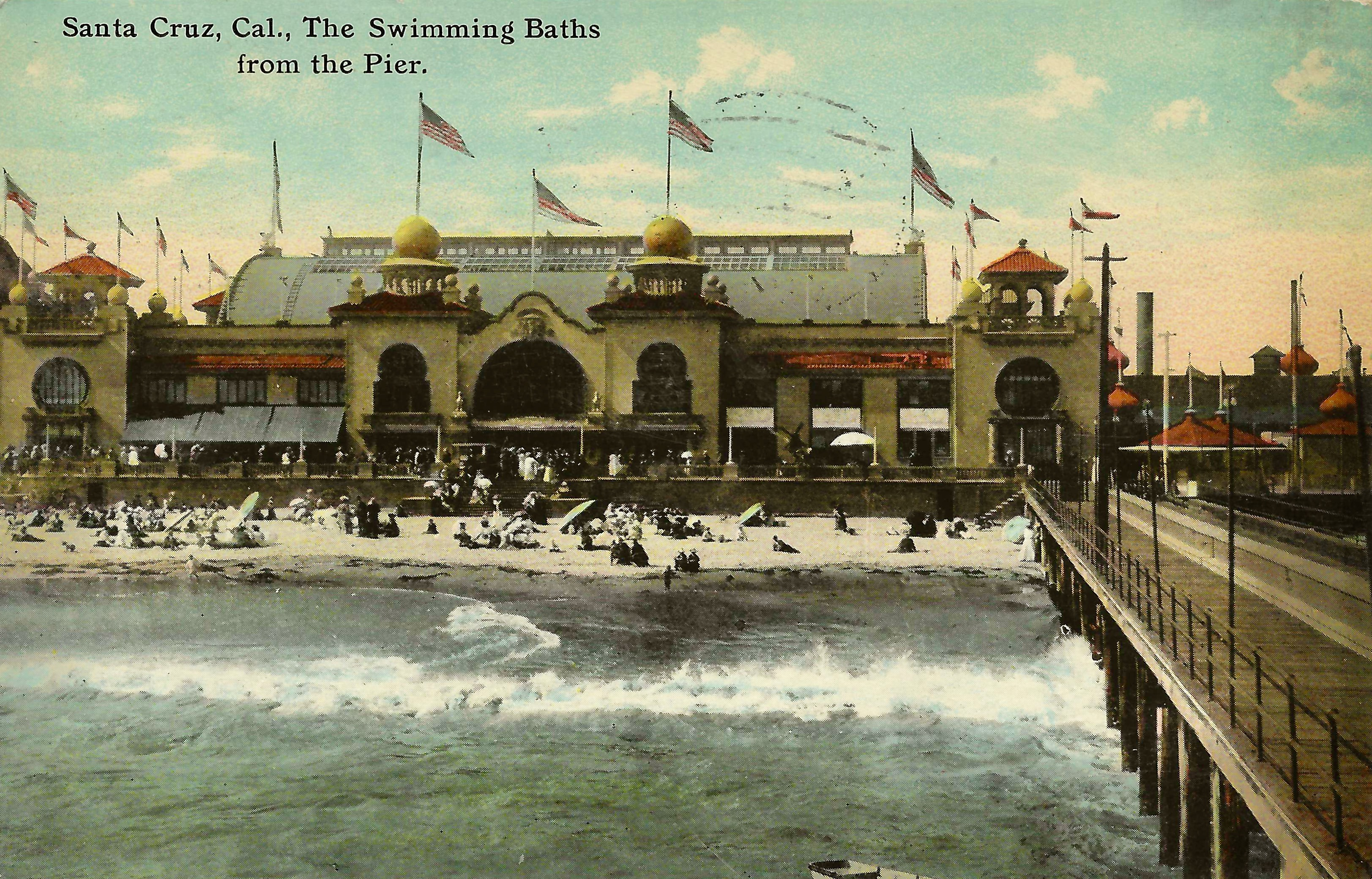
The Plunge Natatorium at the Santa Cruz Beach Boardwalk in 1910

Santa Cruz became one of the first cities to approve marijuana for medicinal uses. In 1992, residents overwhelmingly approved Measure A, which allowed for the medicinal uses of marijuana. Santa Cruz was home to the second above-ground medical marijuana club in the world when the Santa Cruz Cannabis Buyers Club opened its doors in April 1995. Santa Cruz also became one of the first cities in California to test the state's medical marijuana laws in court after the arrest of Valerie Corral and Mike Corral, founders of the Wo/Men's Alliance for Medical Marijuana, by the DEA. In January 2020, Santa Cruz became the third city in the US and second city in California to decriminalize psilocybin mushrooms in addition to a slew of other entheogenic plants on the Federal Schedule 1 Substance List.

In 1998, the Santa Cruz community declared itself a nuclear-free zone, and in 2003, the Santa Cruz City Council became the first city council in the U.S. to denounce the Iraq War. The City Council of Santa Cruz also issued a proclamation opposing the USA PATRIOT Act.

Notable feminist activists Nikki Craft and Ann Simonton resided in Santa Cruz, where they formed the "Praying Mantis Brigade". This collection of activists organized the "Myth California Pageant" in the 1980s protesting the objectification of women. Myth California was staged concurrently with the Miss California pageant held in Santa Cruz since the 1920s. The protests ran for nine years and eventually contributed to the Miss California pageant leaving Santa Cruz.

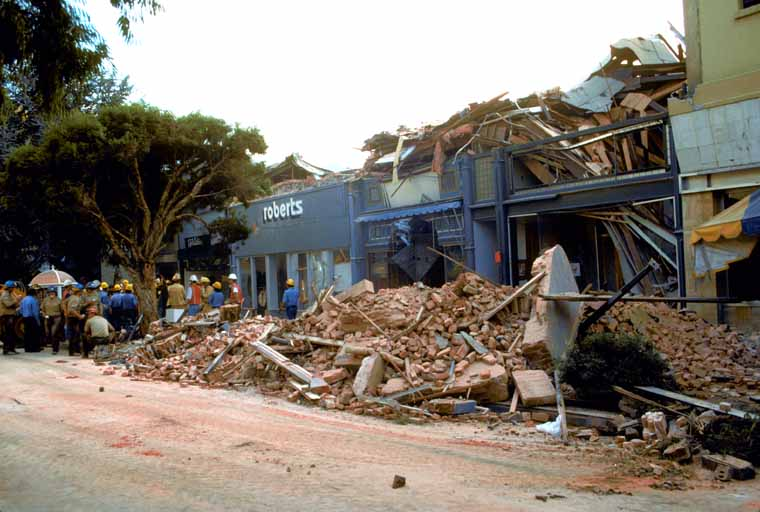
Damage downtown caused by the 1989 Loma Prieta earthquake

Riots occurred on May 1, 2010, sparked when anarchist extremists threw paint at police cars and painted anarchist symbols and anti-capitalist phrases onto buildings, resulting in more than a dozen buildings being vandalized and numerous storefronts being damaged. Property damages are estimated to top roughly $100,000. Prior to the riot, a May Day rally was being held for worker and immigrant rights. According to police, the rally was infiltrated by a local anarchist group, who used the rally as a cover for attacking corporate premises.

Occupy Santa Cruz formed as an autonomous organization in solidarity with the worldwide Occupy movement, a broad-based protest against economic and social inequality. The organization gained most of its notoriety when members barricaded themselves in an empty bank building owned by Wells Fargo and occupied the building for 72 hours, causing $30,000 in damages. Eleven criminal charges were filed, at least seven of which have since been dropped.

== Geography ==
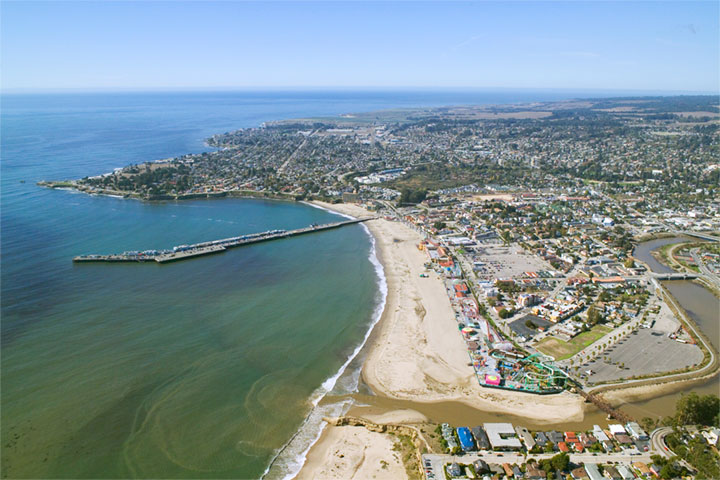
Aerial view of Santa Cruz

Santa Cruz is on the northern edge of Monterey Bay. The area is losing several feet of beach a year.

According to the United States Census Bureau, the city covers an area of 15.8 square miles (41 km^{2}), of which 12.7 square miles (33 km^{2}) is land, and 3.1 square miles (8.0 km^{2}), or 19.51%, is water. To Santa Cruz locals the area is often discussed in terms of distinct regions: east side and west side.

=== Neighborhoods ===
The "westside" of Santa Cruz is commonly accepted to be anything west of the San Lorenzo River and the "eastside" east of the San Lorenzo River all the way to neighboring towns of Soquel and Capitola. The beginning of Aptos is seen as the end boundary for the "eastside".

=== Climate ===
Santa Cruz has mild weather throughout the year, experiencing a warm-summer Mediterranean climate characterized by mild, wet winters and warm, mostly dry summers. Due to its proximity to Monterey Bay, fog and low overcast are common during the night and morning, especially in the summer. Santa Cruz frequently experiences an Indian summer, with the year's warmest temperatures often occurring in the autumn. Since the city faces south rather than west with mountains to its north, temperatures are usually several degrees warmer than in coastal areas to its northwest.

Climate data for Santa Cruz, California (1991–2020 normals, extremes 1893–present)
Month	Jan	Feb	Mar	Apr	May	Jun	Jul	Aug	Sep	Oct	Nov	Dec	Year
Record high °F (°C)	84 (29)	89 (32)	90 (32)	97 (36)	100 (38)	106 (41)	105 (41)	108 (42)	110 (43)	103 (39)	92 (33)	87 (31)	110 (43)
Mean maximum °F (°C)	73.2 (22.9)	75.2 (24.0)	78.0 (25.6)	82.9 (28.3)	84.5 (29.2)	87.2 (30.7)	85.7 (29.8)	88.3 (31.3)	92.6 (33.7)	89.8 (32.1)	79.4 (26.3)	70.8 (21.6)	96.2 (35.7)
Mean daily maximum °F (°C)	62.5 (16.9)	63.9 (17.7)	66.5 (19.2)	69.3 (20.7)	71.4 (21.9)	74.0 (23.3)	74.3 (23.5)	75.8 (24.3)	76.7 (24.8)	73.9 (23.3)	66.7 (19.3)	61.5 (16.4)	69.7 (20.9)
Daily mean °F (°C)	51.9 (11.1)	53.3 (11.8)	55.3 (12.9)	57.5 (14.2)	60.2 (15.7)	62.8 (17.1)	64.3 (17.9)	65.2 (18.4)	64.8 (18.2)	61.7 (16.5)	55.6 (13.1)	51.2 (10.7)	58.7 (14.8)
Mean daily minimum °F (°C)	41.4 (5.2)	42.7 (5.9)	44.1 (6.7)	45.7 (7.6)	49.0 (9.4)	51.6 (10.9)	54.3 (12.4)	54.6 (12.6)	52.9 (11.6)	49.5 (9.7)	44.4 (6.9)	40.9 (4.9)	47.6 (8.7)
Mean minimum °F (°C)	31.9 (−0.1)	33.6 (0.9)	35.8 (2.1)	38.1 (3.4)	42.5 (5.8)	45.3 (7.4)	49.3 (9.6)	49.2 (9.6)	46.5 (8.1)	42.0 (5.6)	35.5 (1.9)	31.3 (−0.4)	29.5 (−1.4)
Record low °F (°C)	20 (−7)	22 (−6)	28 (−2)	29 (−2)	28 (−2)	34 (1)	36 (2)	38 (3)	30 (−1)	20 (−7)	26 (−3)	19 (−7)	19 (−7)
Average precipitation inches (mm)	6.42 (163)	6.10 (155)	4.31 (109)	2.04 (52)	0.87 (22)	0.24 (6.1)	0.01 (0.25)	0.04 (1.0)	0.10 (2.5)	1.32 (34)	3.17 (81)	6.01 (153)	30.63 (778)
Average precipitation days	10.6	10.7	9.5	6.0	3.5	1.3	0.6	0.8	1.1	3.6	6.9	10.2	64.8
Source: NOAA

== Demographics ==
Historical population
Census	Pop.	Note	%±
1860	950		—
1870	2,561		169.6%
1880	3,898		52.2%
1890	5,596		43.6%
1900	5,659		1.1%
1910	11,146		97.0%
1920	10,917		−2.1%
1930	14,395		31.9%
1940	16,896		17.4%
1950	21,970		30.0%
1960	25,596		16.5%
1970	32,076		25.3%
1980	41,483		29.3%
1990	49,040		18.2%
2000	54,593		11.3%
2010	59,946		9.8%
2020	62,956		5.0%
U.S. Decennial Census

=== Racial and ethnic composition ===
Santa Cruz city, California – Racial composition Note: the US Census treats Hispanic/Latino as an ethnic category. This table excludes Latinos from the racial categories and assigns them to a separate category. Hispanics/Latinos may be of any race.
Race (NH = Non-Hispanic)	2020	2010	2000	1990	1980
White alone (NH)	57.8% (36,373)	66.7% (39,985)	72% (39,304)	79% (38,755)	86.2% (35,759)
Black alone (NH)	2.5% (1,571)	1.6% (979)	1.6% (871)	2.1% (1,021)	1.9% (776)
American Indian alone (NH)	0.4% (249)	0.4% (238)	0.5% (248)	0.7% (349)	0.6% (256)
Asian alone (NH)	8.3% (5,222)	7.5% (4,476)	4.8% (2,607)	4.3% (2,133)	2.3% (973)
Pacific Islander alone (NH)	0.1% (74)	0.2% (97)	0.1% (60)		
Other race alone (NH)	0.7% (438)	0.3% (187)	0.5% (247)	0.2% (120)	0.3% (113)
Multiracial (NH)	6.2% (3,918)	3.9% (2,360)	3.2% (1,765)	—	—
Hispanic/Latino (any race)	24% (15,111)	19.4% (11,624)	17.4% (9,491)	13.6% (6,662)	8.7% (3,606)

=== 2020 census ===
As of the 2020 census, Santa Cruz had a population of 62,956. The median age was 33.5 years. 12.5% of residents were under the age of 18 and 15.0% of residents were 65 years of age or older. For every 100 females there were 101.9 males, and for every 100 females age 18 and over there were 101.5 males age 18 and over.

99.8% of residents lived in urban areas, while 0.2% lived in rural areas.

There were 21,731 households in Santa Cruz, of which 22.3% had children under the age of 18 living in them. Of all households, 35.8% were married-couple households, 24.9% were households with a male householder and no spouse or partner present, and 30.0% were households with a female householder and no spouse or partner present. About 31.5% of all households were made up of individuals and 12.8% had someone living alone who was 65 years of age or older.

There were 24,014 housing units, of which 9.5% were vacant. The homeowner vacancy rate was 1.0% and the rental vacancy rate was 4.8%.

=== 2010 census ===
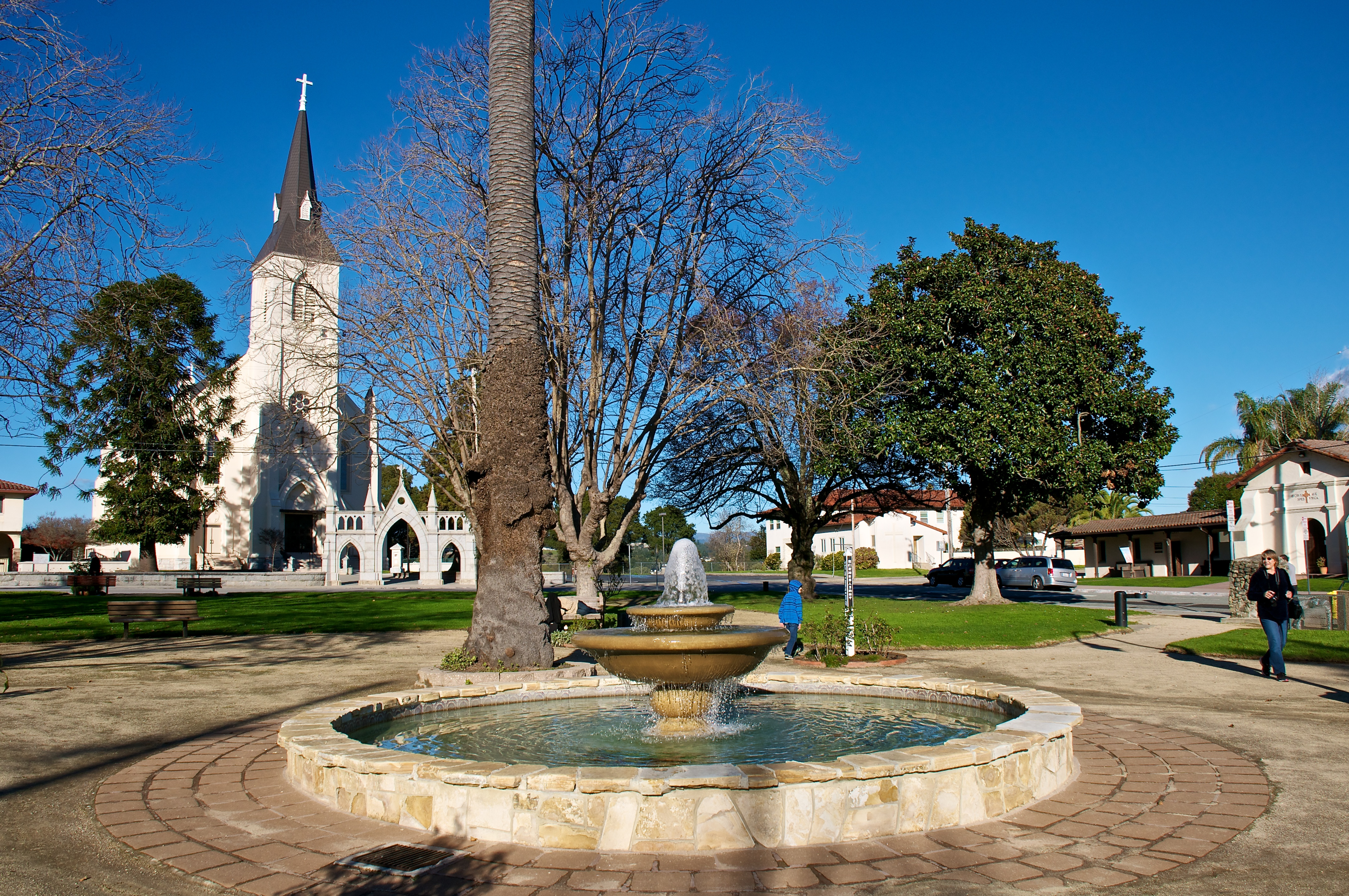
Holy Cross Church, Mission Plaza

The 2010 United States census reported that Santa Cruz had a population of 59,946. The population density was 3,787.2 inhabitants per square mile (1,462.2/km^{2}). The racial makeup of Santa Cruz was 44,661 (74.5%) White, 1,071 (1.8%) African American, 440 (0.7%) Native American, 4,591 (7.7%) Asian, 108 (0.2%) Pacific Islander, 5,673 (9.5%) from other races, and 3,402 (5.7%) from two or more races. Hispanic or Latino of any race were 11,624 persons (19.4%).

The Census reported that 51,657 people (86.2% of the population) lived in households, 7,910 (13.2%) lived in non-institutionalized group quarters, and 379 (0.6%) were institutionalized.

The Pacific Coast in Santa Cruz

There were 21,657 households, out of which 4,817 (22.2%) had children under the age of 18 living in them, 7,310 (33.8%) were opposite-sex married couples living together, 1,833 (8.5%) had a female householder with no husband present, 862 (4.0%) had a male householder with no wife present. There were 1,802 (8.3%) unmarried opposite-sex partnerships, and 379 (1.8%) same-sex married couples or partnerships. 6,773 households (31.3%) were made up of individuals, and 1,862 (8.6%) had someone living alone who was 65 years of age or older. The average household size was 2.39. There were 10,005 families (46.2% of all households); the average family size was 2.92.

The age distribution of the population shows 8,196 people (13.7%) under the age of 18, 17,449 people (29.1%) aged 18 to 24, 15,033 people (25.1%) aged 25 to 44, 13,983 people (23.3%) aged 45 to 64, and 5,285 people (8.8%) who were 65 years of age or older. The median age was 29.9 years. For every 100 females, there were 100.5 males. For every 100 females age 18 and over, there were 99.7 males.

=== 2000 census ===
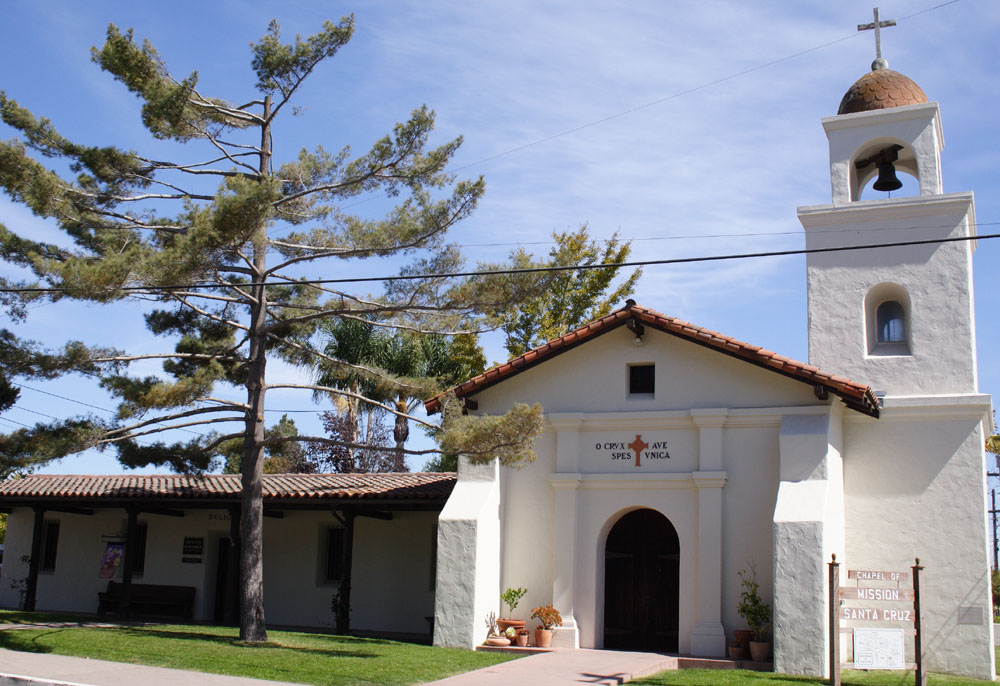
Mission Santa Cruz is a Catholic chapel of the Diocese of Monterey.

Recorded from the census of 2000, there were 54,593 people total with 20,442 households and 10,404 families residing in the city. The population density includes 1,682.2/km^{2} (4,357/mi^{2}). There were 21,504 housing units at an average density of 1,715.8 units per square mile (662.5 units/km^{2}). The racial makeup of the city was 78.7% White, 17.4% Hispanic or Latino, 1.7% African American, 0.9% Native American, 4.9% Asian, 0.1% Pacific Islander, 9.1% from other races, and 4.5% from two or more races.

There were 20,442 households, out of which 25.1% had children under the age of 18 living with them, 37.0% were married couples living together, 9.6% had a female householder with no husband present, and 49.1% were non-families. 29.3% of all households were made up of individuals, and 7.6% had someone living alone who was 65 years of age or older. The average household size was 2.44 and the average family size was 2.98.

In the city, the age distribution of the population shows 17.3% under the age of 18, 20.5% from 18 to 24, 32.6% from 25 to 44, 21.0% from 45 to 64, and 8.5% who were 65 years of age or older. The median age was 32 years. For every 100 females, there were 99.2 males. For every 100 females age 18 and over, there were 97.9 males age 18 and over.

The median income for a household in the city was $50,605, and the median income for a family was $62,231 (these figures had risen to $59,172 and $80,496 respectively as of a 2007 estimate). Males had a median income of $44,751 versus $32,699 for females. The per capita income for the city was $25,758. About 6.6% of families and 16.5% of the population were below the poverty line, including 12.5% of those under age 18 and 4.8% of those age 65 or over.

=== Housing and homelessness ===
By one estimate, Santa Cruz had in 2023 the least affordable rental market in the United States, pushing past San Francisco which was previously the most unaffordable rental market. There were 23,316 housing units at an average density of 1,473.0 units per square mile (568.7 units/km^{2}), of which 9,375 (43.3%) were owner-occupied, and 12,282 (56.7%) were occupied by renters. The homeowner vacancy rate was 1.2%; the rental vacancy rate was 3.4%. 22,861 people (38.1% of the population) lived in owner-occupied housing units and 28,796 people (48.0%) lived in rental housing units. The median price of a home being $640,000 as of April 2013.

Santa Cruz has one of the highest rates of homelessness in the US, with 9,041 estimated homeless in Santa Cruz county in 2011, approximately 3.5% of the total county population. with over 52% of homeless experiencing some form of mental illness, including clinical depression or PTSD and over 26% suffering unspecified mental illness. Additionally, 38% of homeless surveyed in Santa Cruz county in 2011 experienced drug and/or alcohol dependency. In recent years, citizen groups such as Take Back Santa Cruz, established in 2009, have lobbied city government and officials to address what they view as a public safety crisis, a situation that has gathered national attention.

== Economy ==
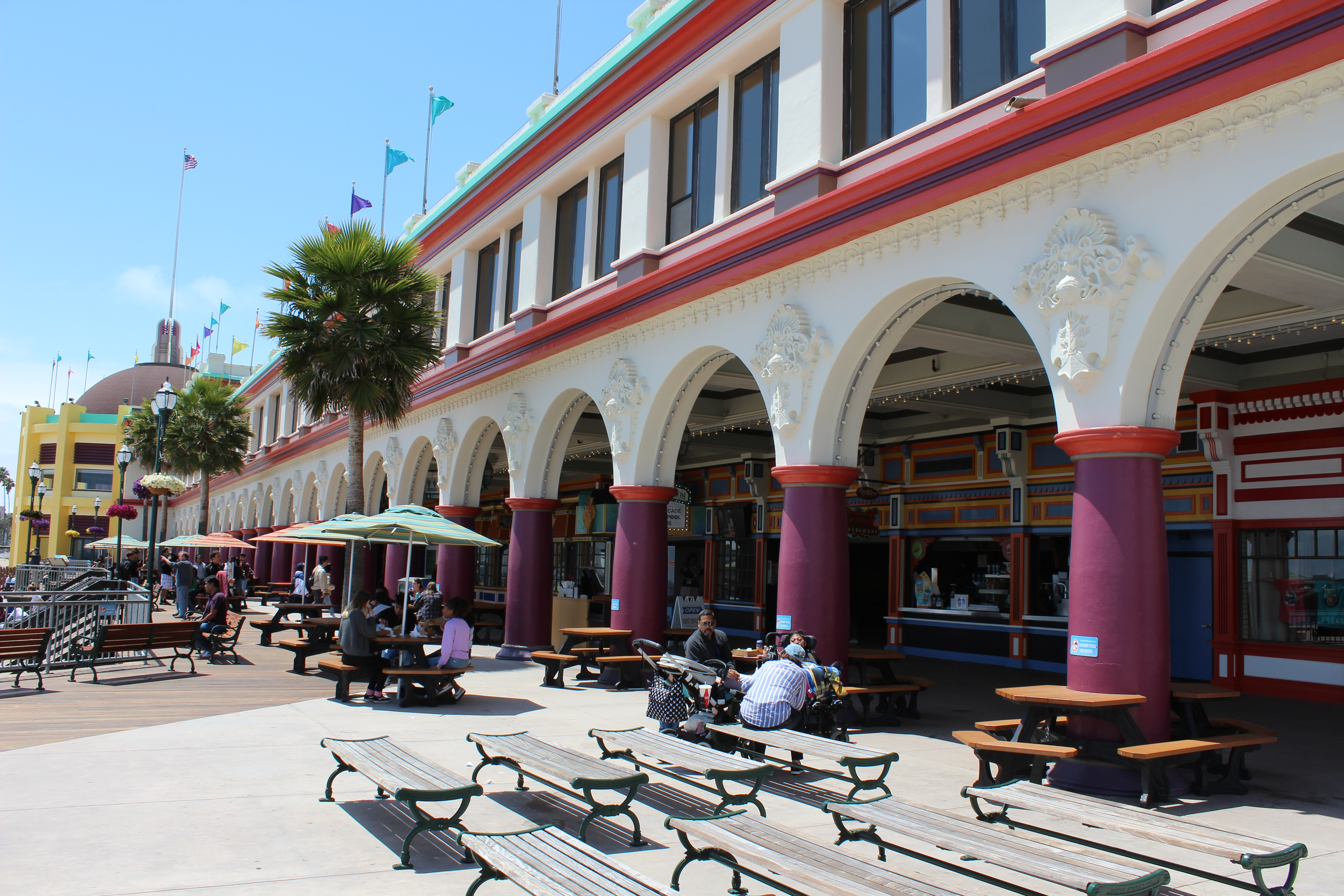
Shops and restaurants at the Santa Cruz Beach Boardwalk

The principal industries of Santa Cruz are agriculture, tourism, education (UC Santa Cruz) and high technology. Santa Cruz is a center of the organic agriculture movement, and many specialty products as well as housing the headquarters of California Certified Organic Farmers.

Tourist attractions include the classic Santa Cruz Beach Boardwalk on the beach, the redwood forests in the Santa Cruz Mountains above the town, and Monterey Bay, which is protected as a marine sanctuary.

Technology companies have made Santa Cruz their home since the 1980s. Examples from that era include the Santa Cruz Operation (later Tarantella, Inc.), Plantronics, and Parallel Computers, Inc. Joby Aviation is also headquartered in Santa Cruz.

Downtown Santa Cruz contains numerous commercial storefronts and businesses. Pacific Avenue, the primary thoroughfare of the downtown area, frequently features street performers, musicians, and artists. These performances provide live music and entertainment along the sidewalks, reflecting the local artistic culture.

=== Top employers ===
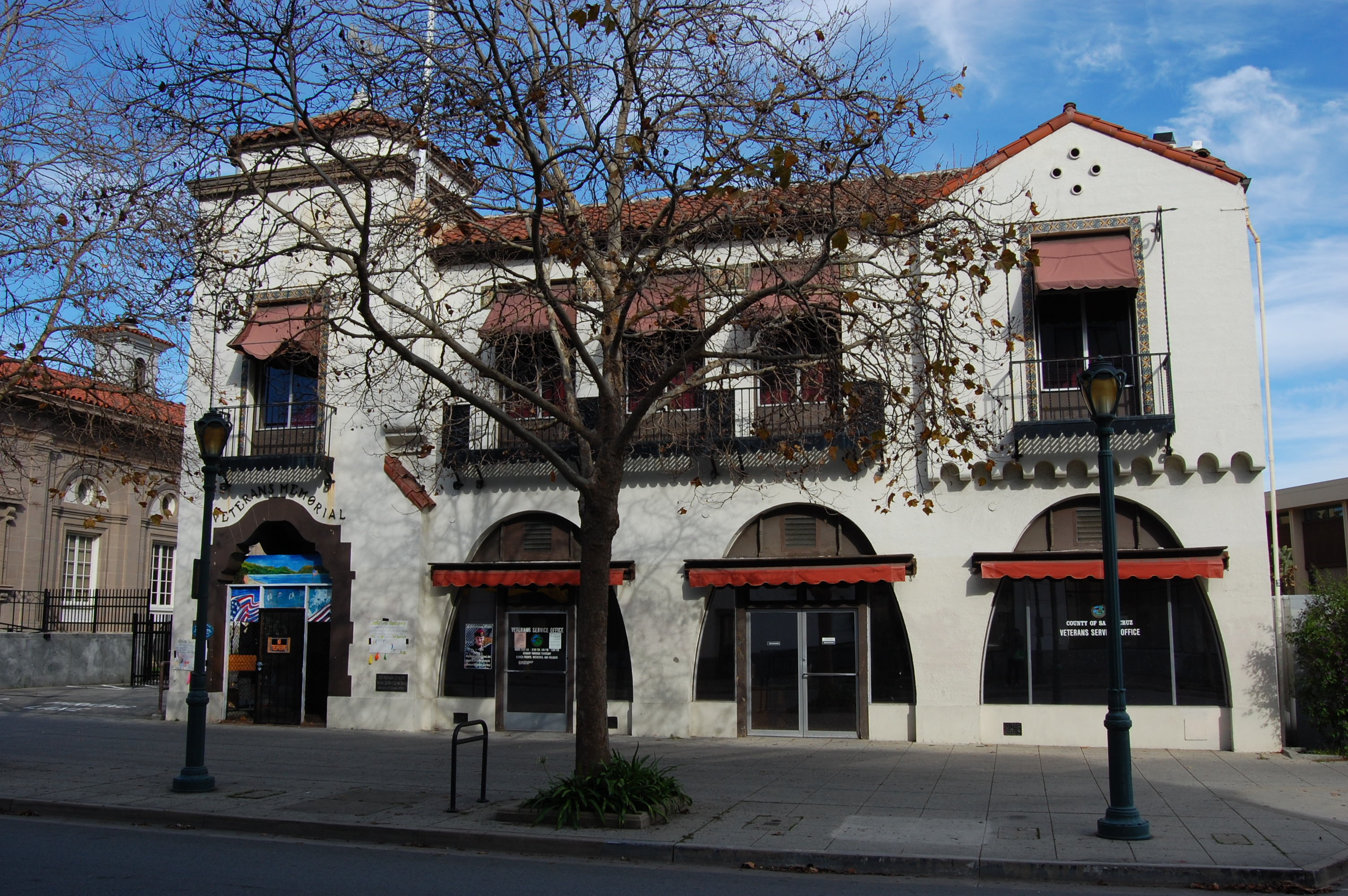
Santa Cruz Veterans Memorial Building, built in 1932

As of 2023, the top employers within the city were:

#	Employer	# of Employees
1	University of California, Santa Cruz	9,105
2	County of Santa Cruz	2,804
3	City of Santa Cruz	914
4	Costco Wholesale Corp	314
5	Safeway Inc.	224
6	New Leaf Community Market	202
7	DBA Santa Cruz Nutritionals	200
8	Crow's Nest	194
9	Santa Cruz Beach Boardwalk	186
10	NHS, Inc.	148

== Arts and culture ==
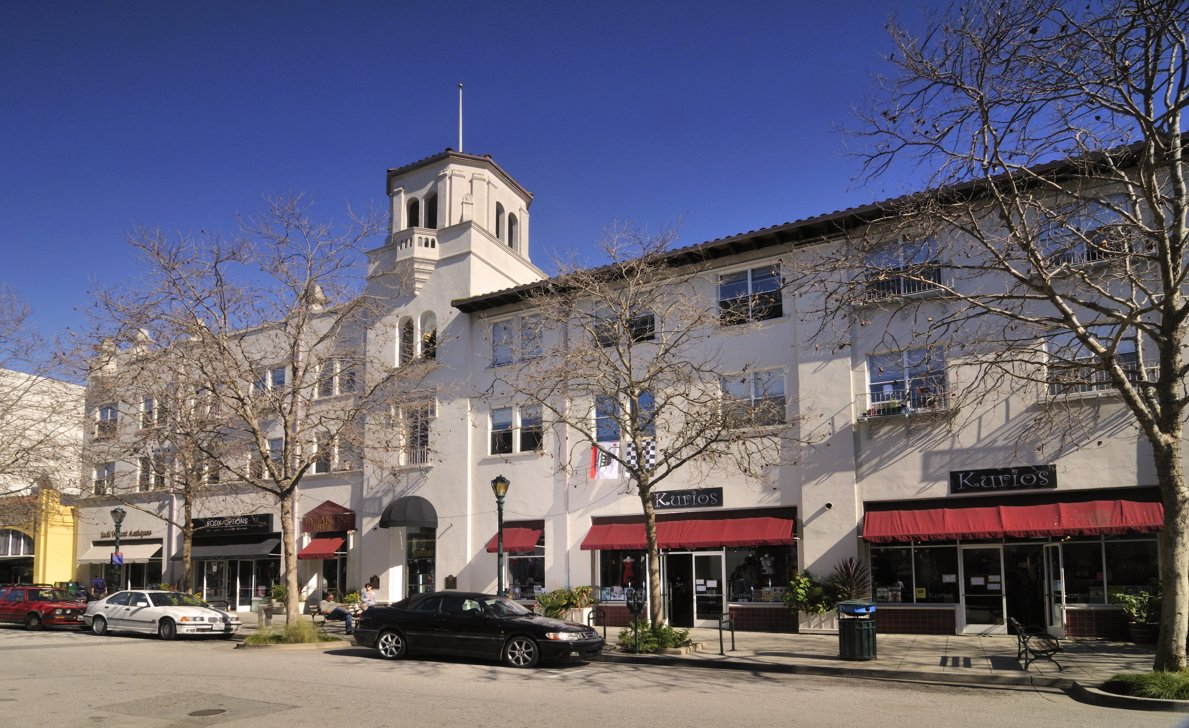
Mission Revival architecture in Downtown Santa Cruz

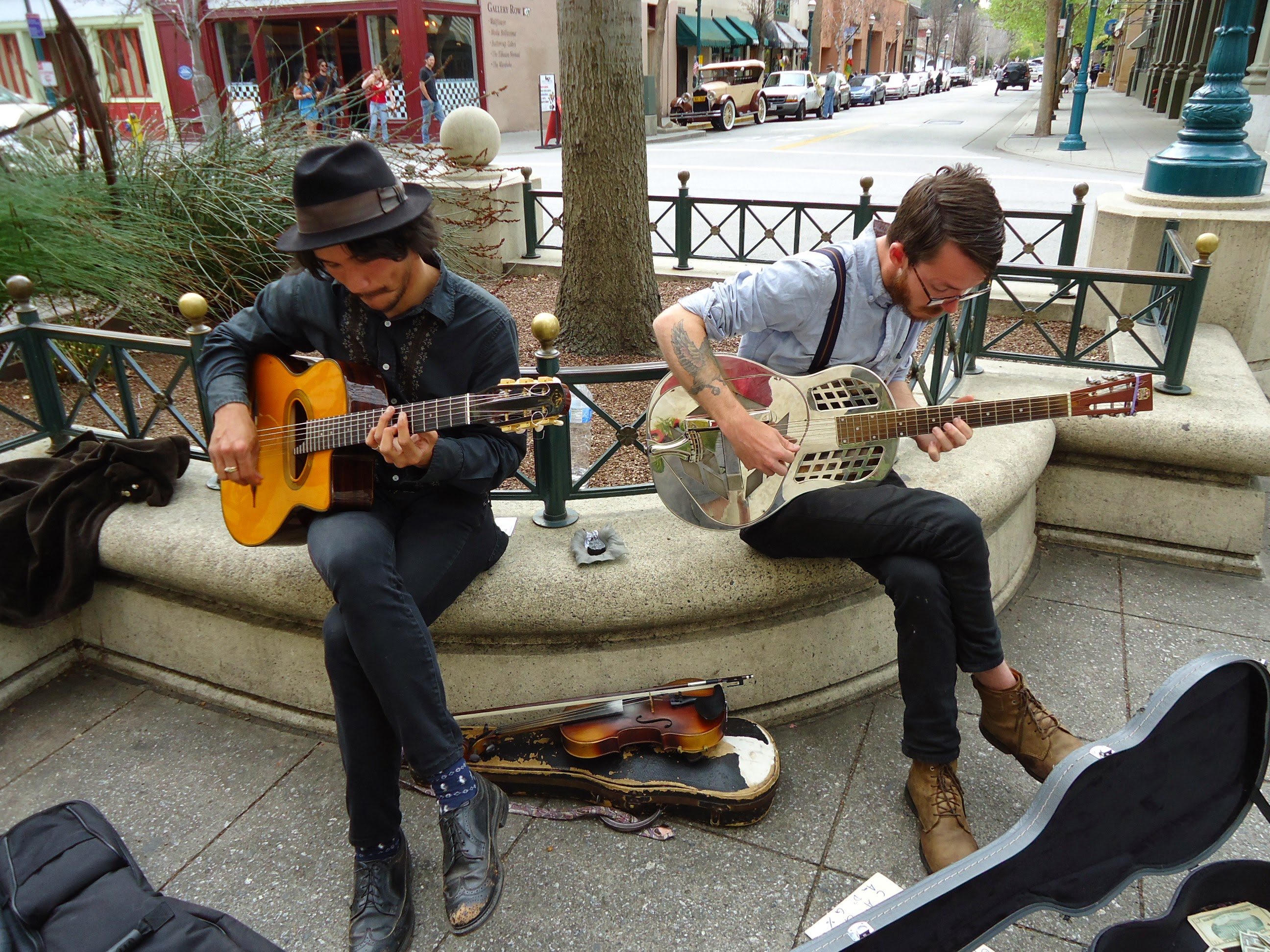
Street musicians on Pacific Avenue

Santa Cruz has a number of cultural institutions and other attractions, including the University of California, Santa Cruz, Arboretum; Mission Santa Cruz; the Santa Cruz Museum of Natural History; the Santa Cruz Museum of Art and History; the Santa Cruz Art League (which includes an art gallery, theater, and classroom); the Santa Cruz Surfing Museum (housed in a lighthouse near Steamer Lane); and the Tannery Arts Center.

Santa Cruz hosts numerous cultural events and festivals every year. The Cabrillo Festival of Contemporary Music is an annual festival of contemporary music for orchestra that has been called a "new music mecca" by The New York Times. Santa Cruz Shakespeare is an annual summer festival that performs William Shakespeare plays every summer. Other notable events include the Santa Cruz Film Festival, the Santa Cruz Blues Festival, the Santa Cruz Digital Arts & New Media Festival, and Santa Cruz Pride. The O'Neill Cold Water Classic is annual surfing event that draws crowds at the popular Steamer Lane.

The Open Studios Art Tour is an art fair has been run for more than three decades and draws artists and patrons from around the area. First Friday Santa Cruz is a monthly event features dozens of art openings in the Santa Cruz area on the first Friday of the month.

The Santa Cruz County Symphony, founded in 1958, is a fully professional ensemble of 65 members which presents an annual concert series at the Santa Cruz Civic Auditorium and the Mello Center in Watsonville.

=== Historic landmarks ===
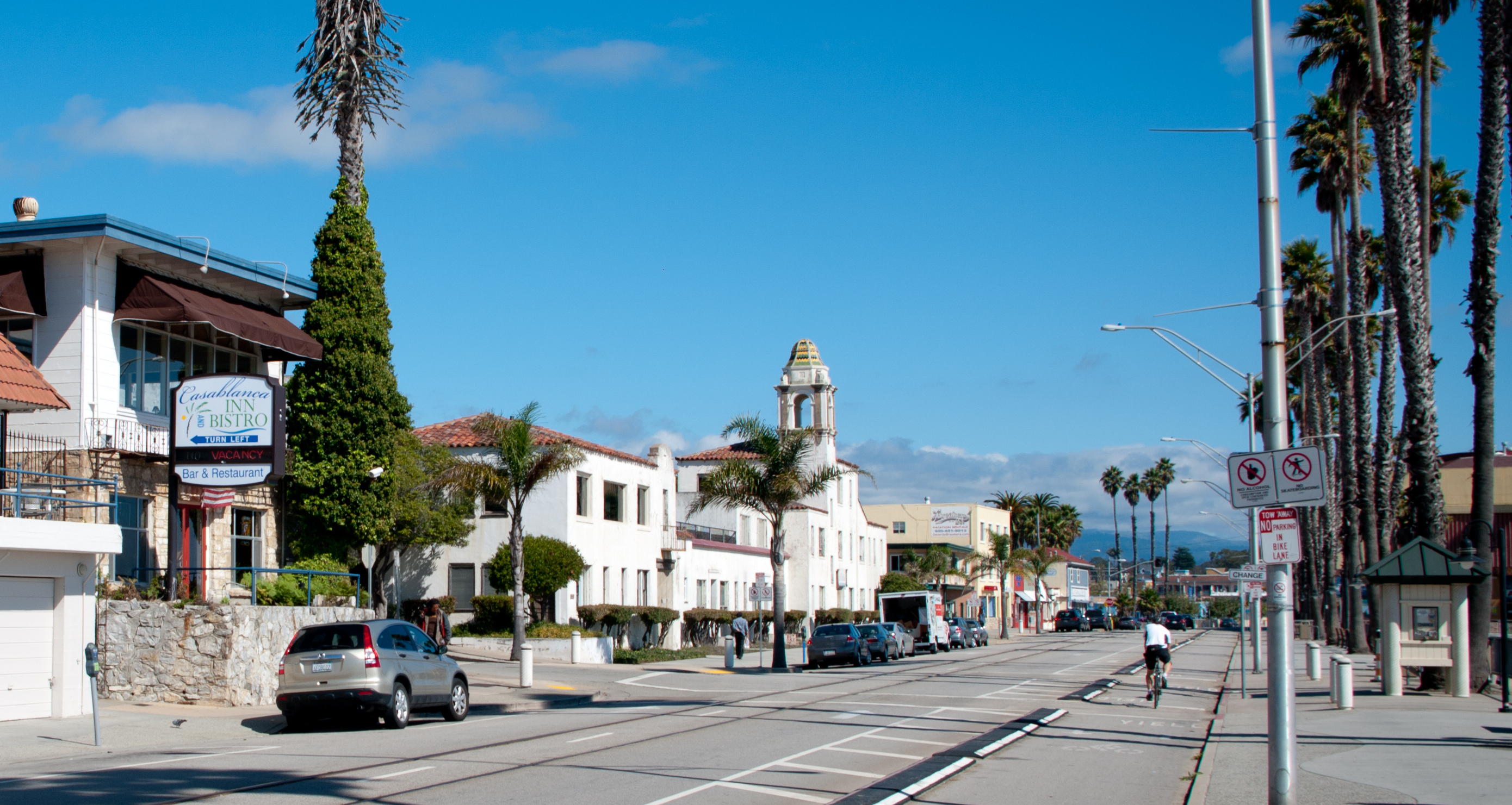
Beach Street is a popular tourist hotspot fronting Santa Cruz Beach.

By the 1860s, Pacific Avenue had become the main street of downtown Santa Cruz, and remains so today. Local architect Kermit Darrow and landscape architect Roy Rydell were engaged in 1969 to convert several blocks of Pacific Avenue into a semi-pedestrian street named the Pacific Garden Mall. The Loma Prieta earthquake of 1989 destroyed nearly all of the 19th-century buildings in the downtown area. The Pacific Avenue Historic District had been recognized by the National Register of Historic Places; it was delisted in 1991. After the earthquake, the Pacific Garden Mall theme was eliminated, and an updated downtown design plan by ROMA Design Group was implemented. As of 2016, only one empty lot remains on Pacific Avenue from the destruction of the 1989 earthquake.

Landmarks on the National Register of Historic Places listings in Santa Cruz County, California include the Branciforte Adobe, the Cowell Lime Works Historic District, the Golden Gate Villa, the Hinds House, Mission Santa Cruz, the Neary-Rodriguez Adobe, the Octagon Building, and the Santa Cruz Looff Carousel and Roller Coaster, among others.

Landmarks on the California Register of Historical Resources include Mission Santa Cruz, Villa de Branciforte, and the Santa Cruz Beach Boardwalk.

=== "Surf City" nickname controversy ===
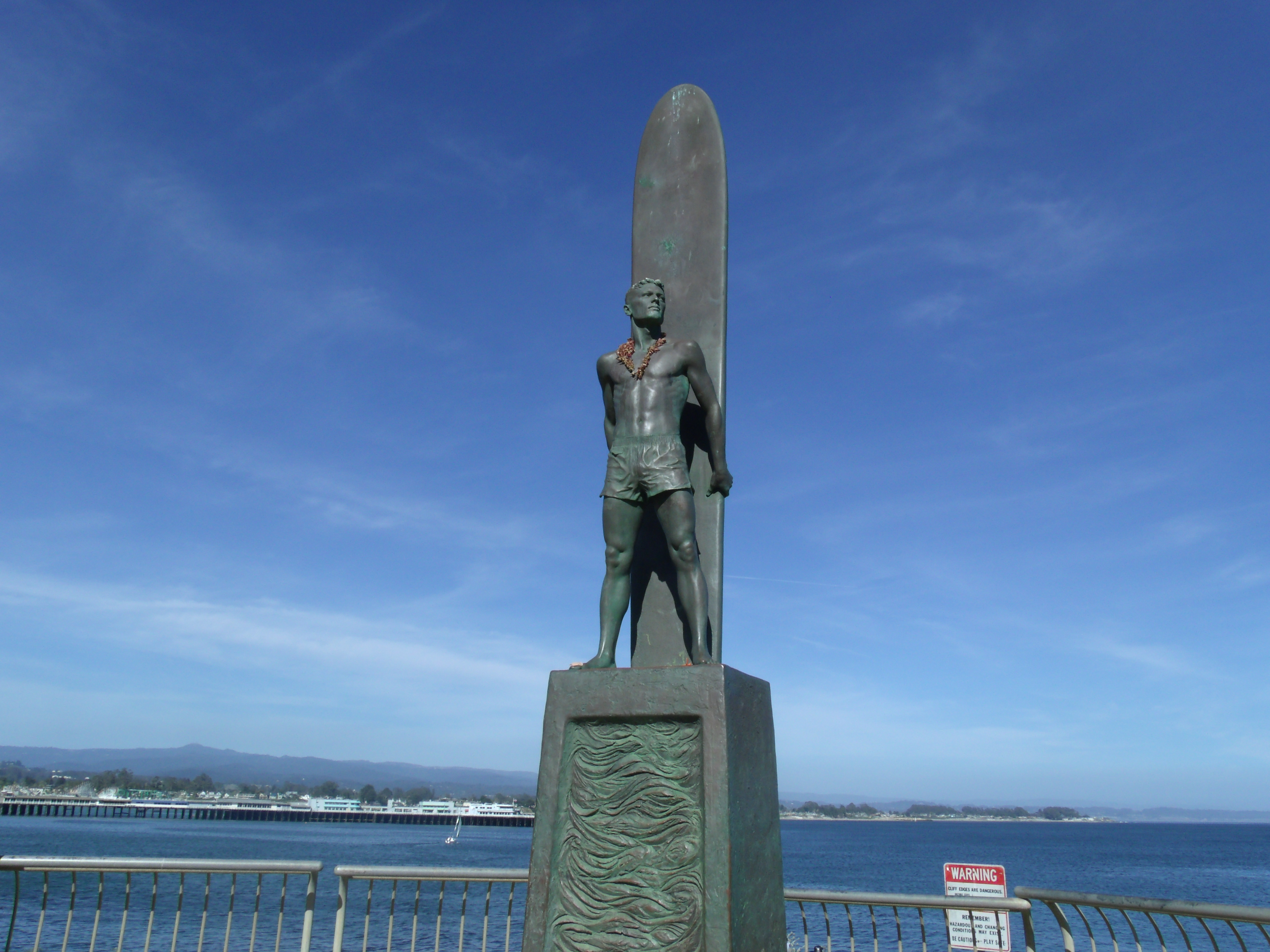
The Monument to the Surfer

After Huntington Beach, California, trademarked the "Surf City USA" name, Santa Cruz politicians tried to stop the mark from being registered by the U.S. Patent and Trademark Office because of a 10-year-old controversy over Santa Cruz's nickname "Surf City". Huntington Beach has obtained a total of seven registrations for the "Surf City USA" trademark. None of these registrations of the trademark are on the principal register, but on the secondary register, which means that Huntington Beach has no exclusive right to assert ownership over the "Surf City USA" trademark. Two Santa Cruz surf shops, Shoreline Surf Shop and Noland's on the Wharf, sued the city of Huntington Beach in order to protect the public use of the term "Surf City". The parties reached a confidential settlement in January 2008, in which neither side admitted liability and all claims and counterclaims were dismissed. The Santa Cruz surf shops continue to print T-shirts, and the Visitor's Bureau retains the right to use the trademark.

== Sports ==
The Santa Cruz Warriors, of the NBA G League, and Santa Cruz Derby Girls, an amateur roller derby league, play at the Kaiser Permanente Arena.

== Parks and recreation ==
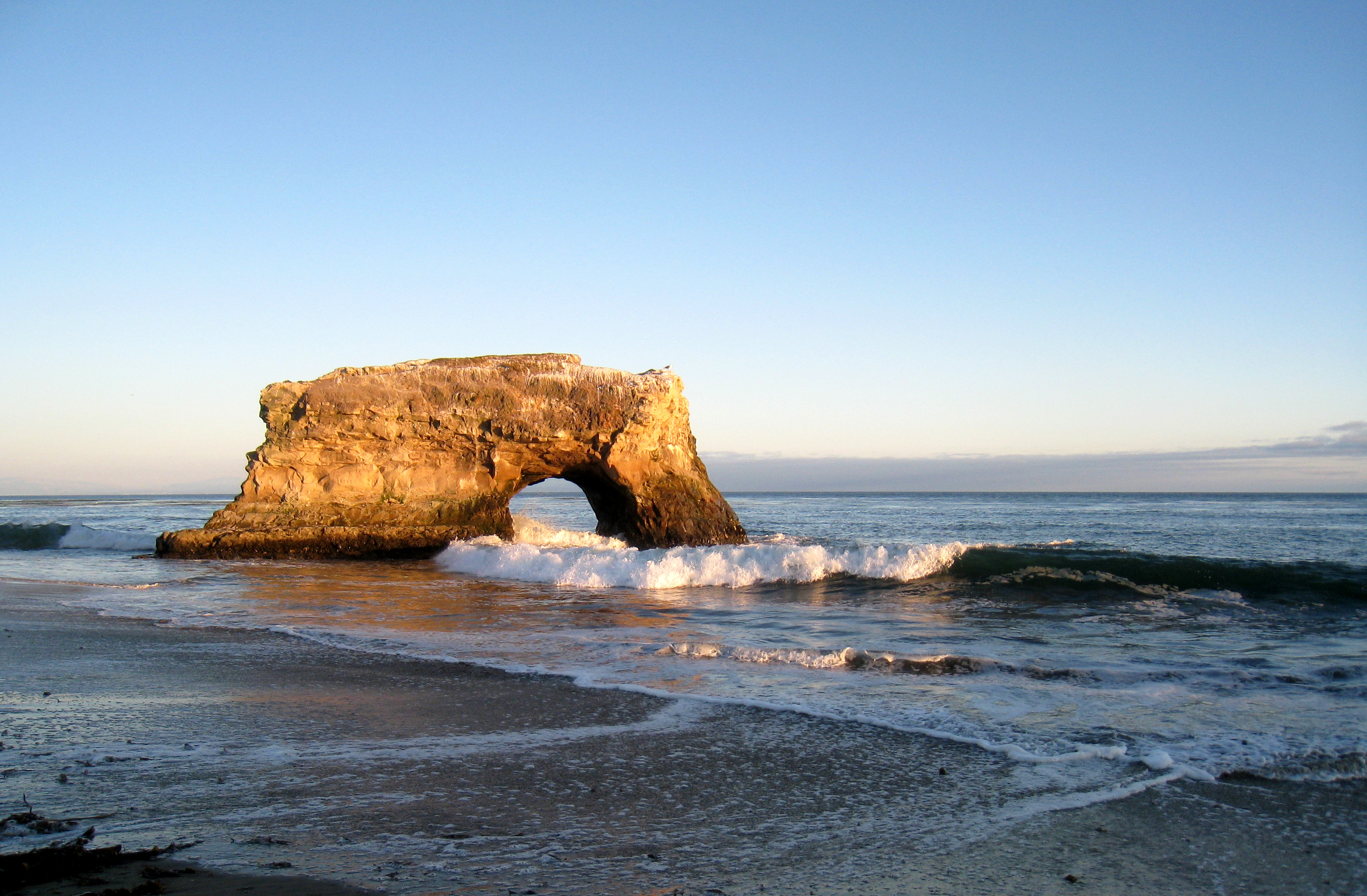
Natural Bridges State Beach

Santa Cruz is home to several state parks and beaches, including Lighthouse Field State Beach, Natural Bridges State Beach, Santa Cruz Mission State Historic Park, Twin Lakes State Beach, and Seabright State Beach.

Santa Cruz has three greenbelt open space properties along the city limits, including Arana Gulch, Moore Creek, and Pogonip. There are also five community parks and eighteen neighborhood parks.

Pogonip Open Space is located adjacent to the University of California, Santa Cruz. It includes second-growth oak and redwood forest, meadows and several streams, and is crossed by several hiking trails. Pogonip was the name of the former country club there, which once had a golf course and polo field.

Natural Bridges State Marine Reserve is a marine protected area off the coast at the northern edge of Santa Cruz. Like underwater parks, marine protected areas help conserve ocean wildlife and marine ecosystems. Most of the rest of the coastline of Santa Cruz lies adjacent to the Monterey Bay National Marine Sanctuary.

The Santa Cruz Wharf is known for fishing, viewing marine mammals and other recreation. Local parks offer many opportunities for birding and butterfly watching, as well as outdoor sports such as skateboarding, cycling, camping, hiking, and rock climbing. The Santa Cruz Skatepark is open to the public 7 days a week and is free. In addition to its reputation in surfing and skateboarding, Santa Cruz is known for other sports such as disc ultimate and disc golf. The DeLaveaga Disc Golf Course designed by hall of fame and local disc sports promoter Tom Schot, hosts PDGA tournaments, including the annual Masters Cup. DeLaveaga was the disc golf and discathon venue for the WFDF-sanctioned World Disc Games overall event held in Santa Cruz in July 2005.

=== Surfing ===
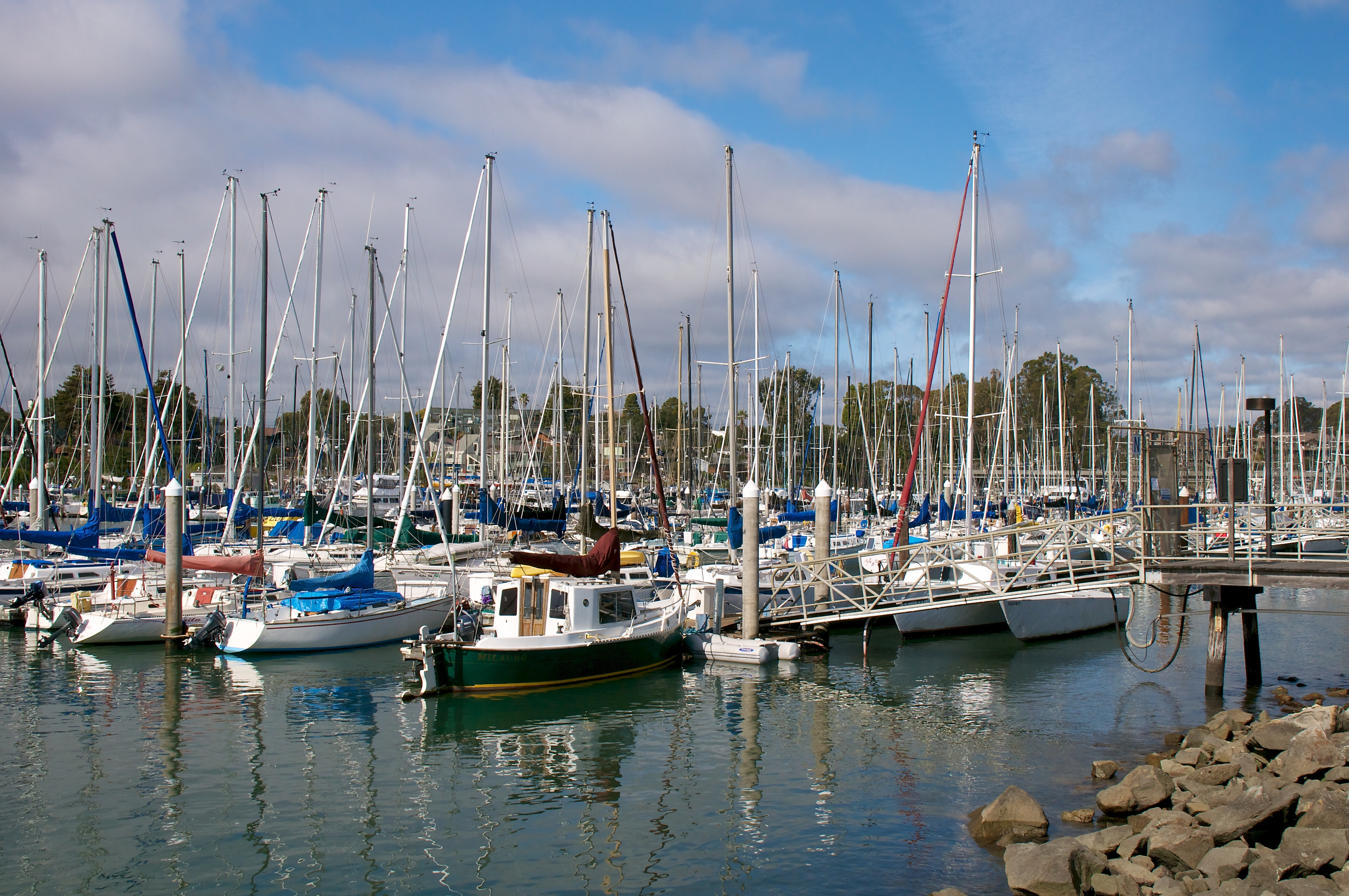
Santa Cruz Harbor

Santa Cruz is well known for watersports such as sailing, diving, swimming, stand up paddle boarding, paddling, and is regarded as one of the best spots in the world for surfing. It is the home of O'Neill Wetsuits and Santa Cruz Surfboards, as well as Santa Cruz Skateboards and Santa Cruz Bicycles. The Santa Cruz Beach Boardwalk is California's oldest amusement park and a designated State Historic Landmark. It is family-operated, and celebrated its Centennial in 2007. It is home to the iconic Giant Dipper roller coaster, which is currently the fifth oldest coaster in the United States. Home to a National Historic Landmark, a 1911 Charles I. D. Looff Carousel and 1924 Giant Dipper roller coaster, the Boardwalk has been owned and operated by the Santa Cruz Seaside Company since 1915.

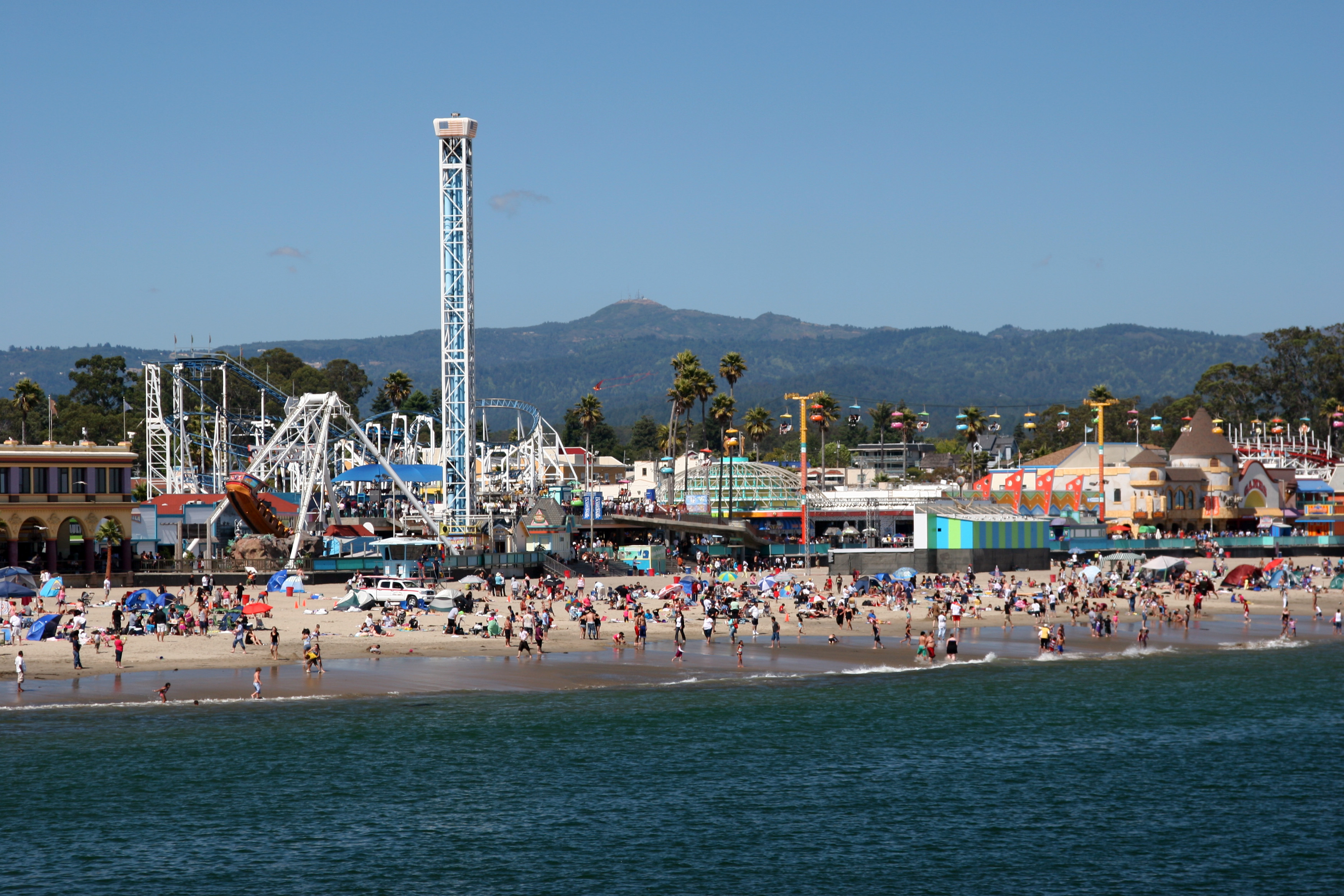
Santa Cruz Beach Boardwalk

In one of the first published descriptions of surfing in California, three Hawaiian princes, Prince David Kawānanakoa, Prince Edward Abnel Keliʻiahonui and Prince Jonah Kalanianaʻole, surfed on locally milled redwood boards at the mouth of the San Lorenzo River in July 1885. Santa Cruz has 11 world-class surf breaks, including the point breaks over rock bottoms near Steamer Lane and Pleasure Point, which create some of the best surfing waves in the world. The Santa Cruz Surfing Museum at Steamer Lane is staffed by docents from the Santa Cruz Surfing Club who have surfed Santa Cruz waves since the 1930s. Santa Cruz hosts several surf contests drawing international participants each year, including the O'Neill Cold Water Classic, the International Longboard Association contest, and many others.

== Government ==
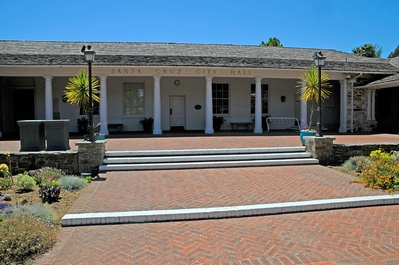
Santa Cruz City Hall

In 2022, Santa Cruz switched from an at-large city council system to representation by district, with a separate elected mayor. Fred Keeley became the first elected mayor.

In the California State Legislature, Santa Cruz is in the 17th senatorial district, represented by Democrat John Laird, and in the 28th Assembly district, represented by Democrat Gail Pellerin. In the United States House of Representatives, Santa Cruz is in California's 19th congressional district, represented by Democrat Jimmy Panetta.

== Education ==
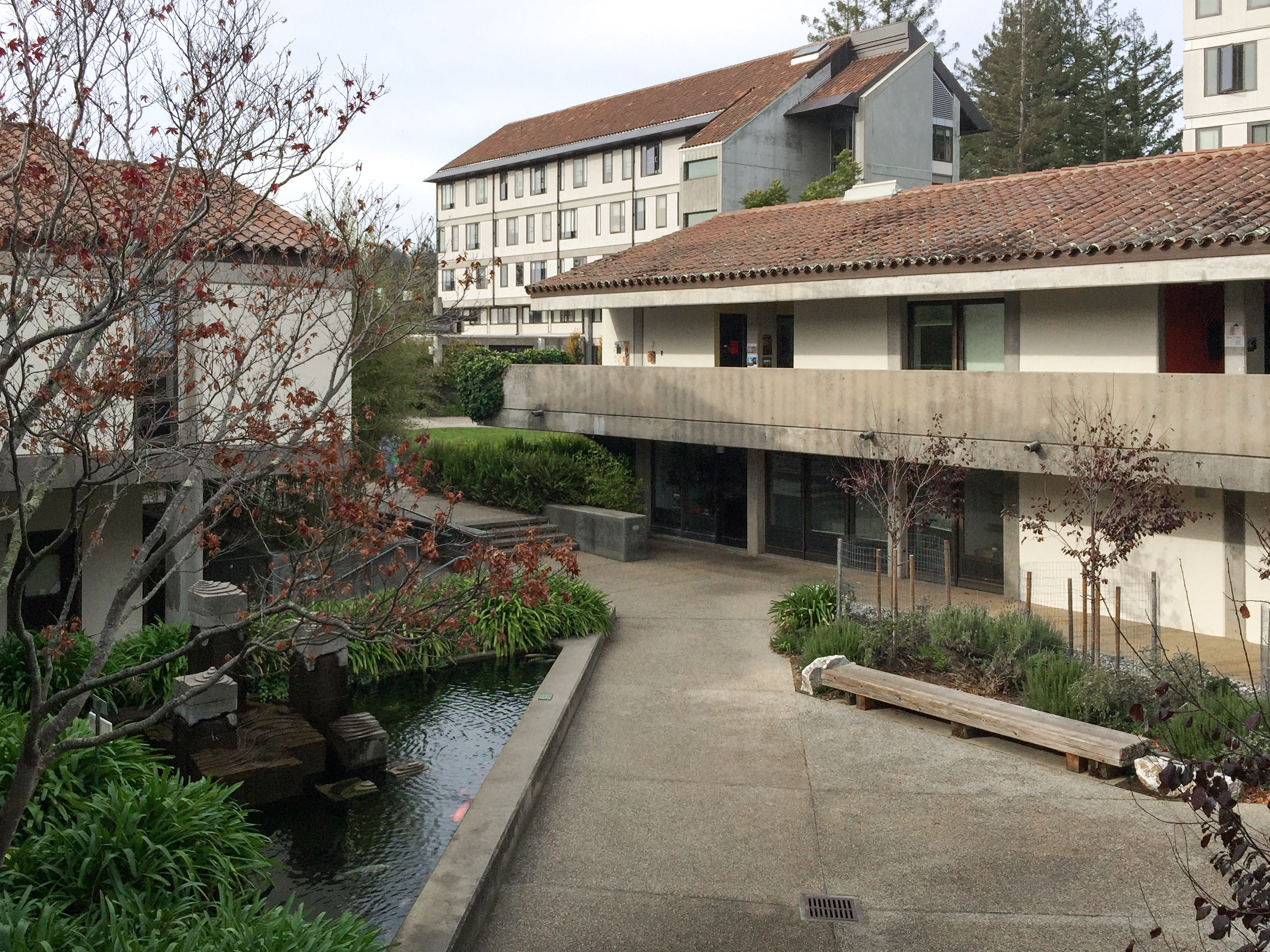
University of California, Santa Cruz

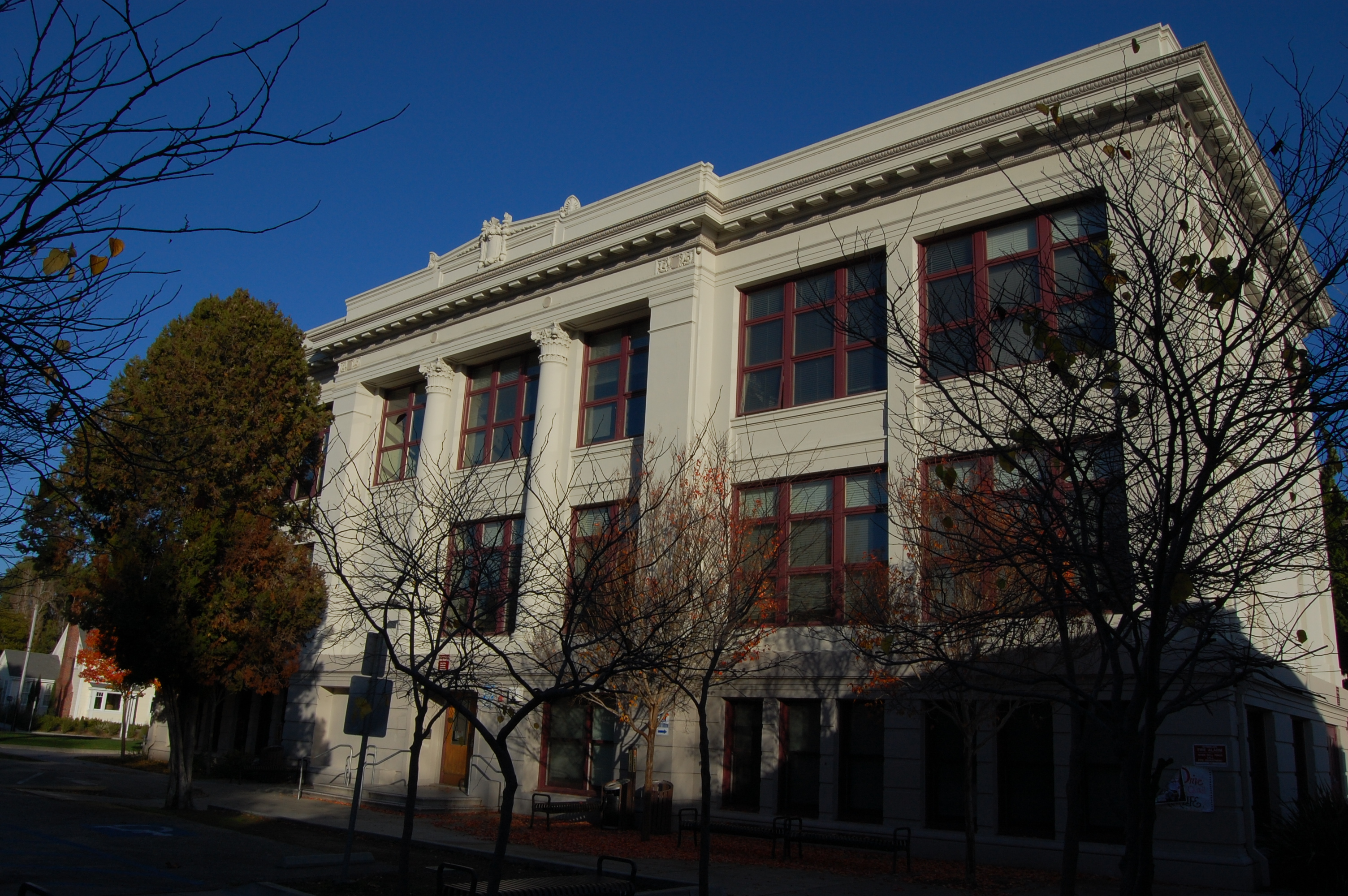
Historic Santa Cruz High School

Santa Cruz is home to several educational institutions. The city is served by the Santa Cruz City School District. Notable public schools include Santa Cruz High School and Harbor High School.

Notable private or charter schools include Georgiana Bruce Kirby Preparatory School (a grade 6–12 private school), Pacific Collegiate School (a grade 7–12 charter school), Cypress Charter High School, and Monterey Coast Preparatory.

Santa Cruz is notably the home of the University of California, Santa Cruz. The city is also host to Five Branches University and a campus of Cabrillo College (which is located in nearby Aptos and Watsonville and holds some classes within Santa Cruz city).

UC Santa Cruz's Long Marine Laboratory is a marine research facility on the western edge of the city.

== Media ==
The Santa Cruz Sentinel is Santa Cruz's only daily newspaper. The area is also served by the weekly newspaper Good Times, bought in 2014 by the owners of its competitor Santa Cruz Weekly, who then merged the two, continuing one paper under the Good Times name, and the legal paper Santa Cruz Record. University of California has its own publication, City on a Hill Press, and an alternative humor publication, Fish Rap Live!. There is also an online newspaper called Lookout Santa Cruz.

Radio stations broadcast from Santa Cruz include KSCO, KOMY, KZSC, KLVM, KSQL, KSQD, and KPIG-FM.

== Infrastructure ==
=== Transportation ===
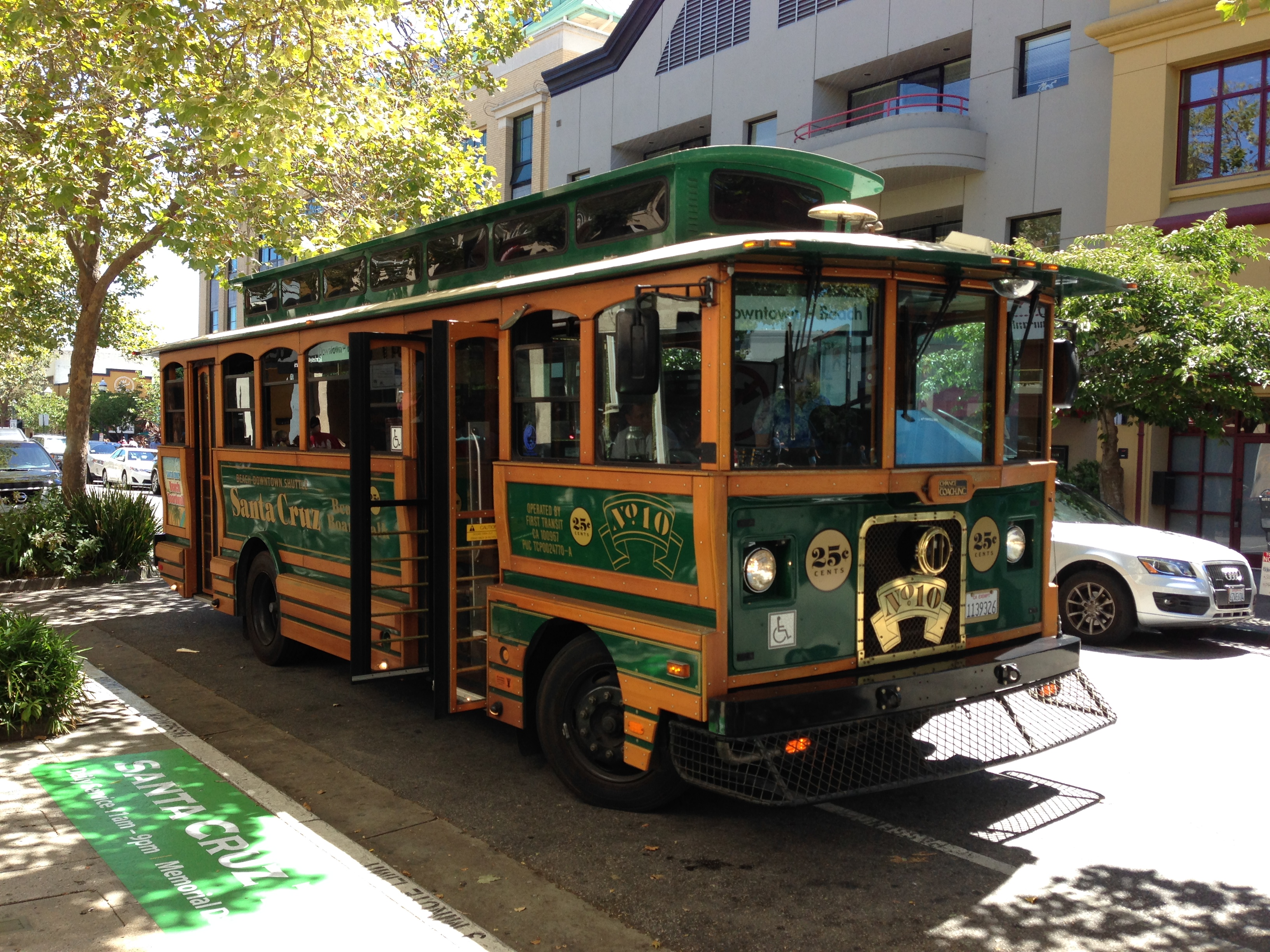
The beach–downtown shuttle trolley

State Routes 1 and 17 are the main roads in and out of Santa Cruz, with the latter being the primary route north to San Jose and the rest of the San Francisco Bay Area. Geographically constrained between the Santa Cruz Mountains and the Monterey Bay, the narrow transportation corridor served by SR 1, California's Pacific Coast Highway, suffers excessive congestion. The ramp from SR 1 northbound to SR 17 southbound, onto Ocean Street, is commonly known as the "fish hook" due to its tightening curve. A project to widen the highway and this interchange was begun in 2006 and completed in the fall of 2008.

The nearest airports served by major commercial airlines are San Jose International Airport, Monterey Regional Airport, San Francisco International Airport, and Oakland International Airport. The nearest public airport of any kind is Watsonville Municipal Airport, about eight miles to the southeast, which serves general aviation users.

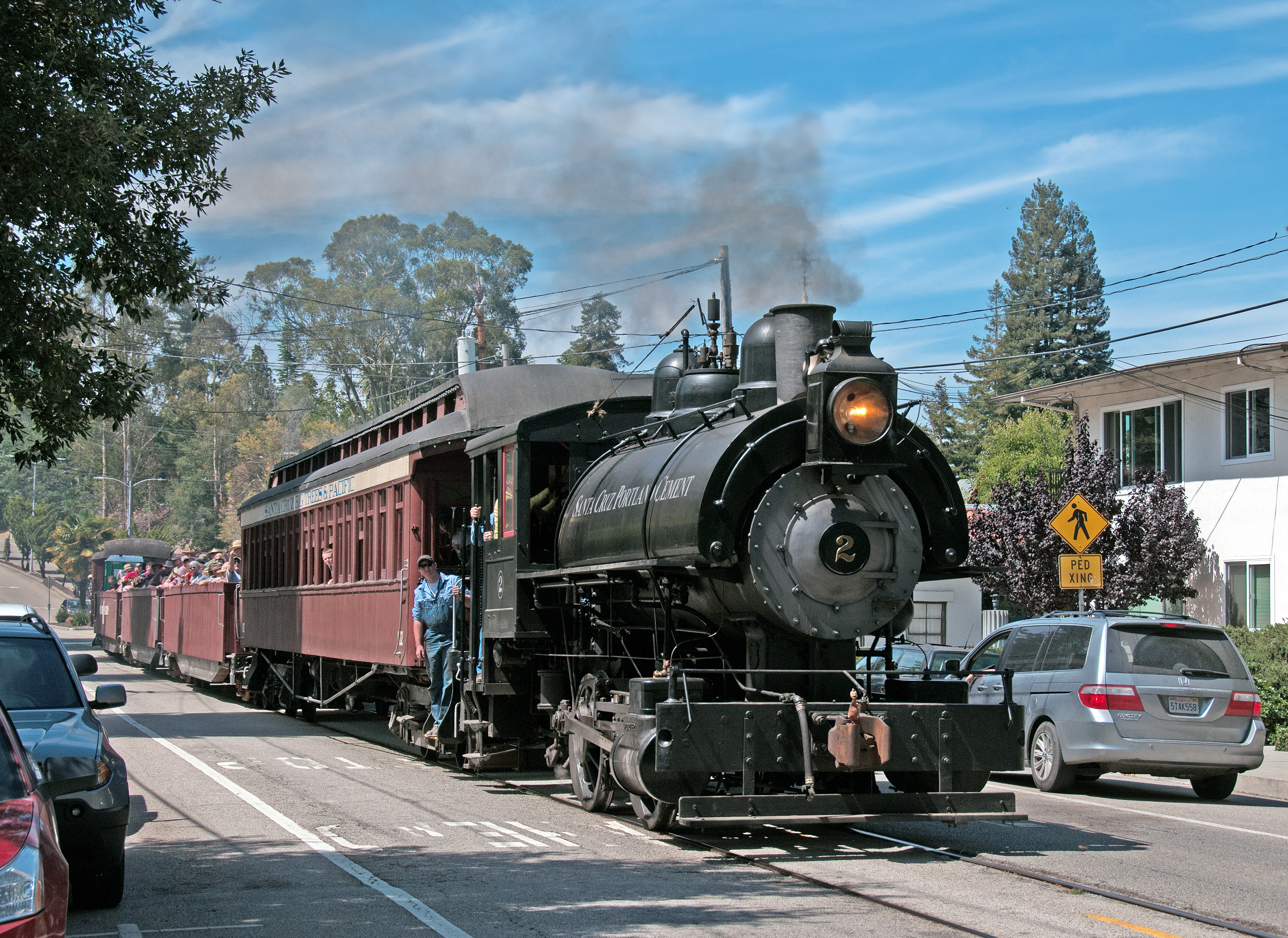
Big Trees Railroad excursion train on Chestnut St., Santa Cruz

Horsecars offered tram service from 1876, and the Santa Cruz, Garfield Park and Capitola Electric Railway began operations in 1881. The Union Traction Company consolidated three electric tram service routes in 1904. One line ran from DeLaveaga Park along Water Street and Pacific Avenue to the beach, another from Ocean Cliffs to downtown along what would become SR 1, and a line through Seabright to Capitola was completed in 1906. Competition from automobiles ended streetcar service in 1926. The Santa Cruz Metropolitan Transit District now provides bus service throughout Santa Cruz County.

Amtrak serves Santa Cruz via Amtrak Thruway from rail connections at Amtrak San Jose Diridon Train Station operated by the Santa Cruz Metropolitan Transit District by way of a partnership with the Amtrak, Capitol Corridor, and Santa Clara Valley Transportation Authority. Other rail connections such as Altamont Corridor Express and Caltrain are also available at Amtrak's San Jose passenger station.

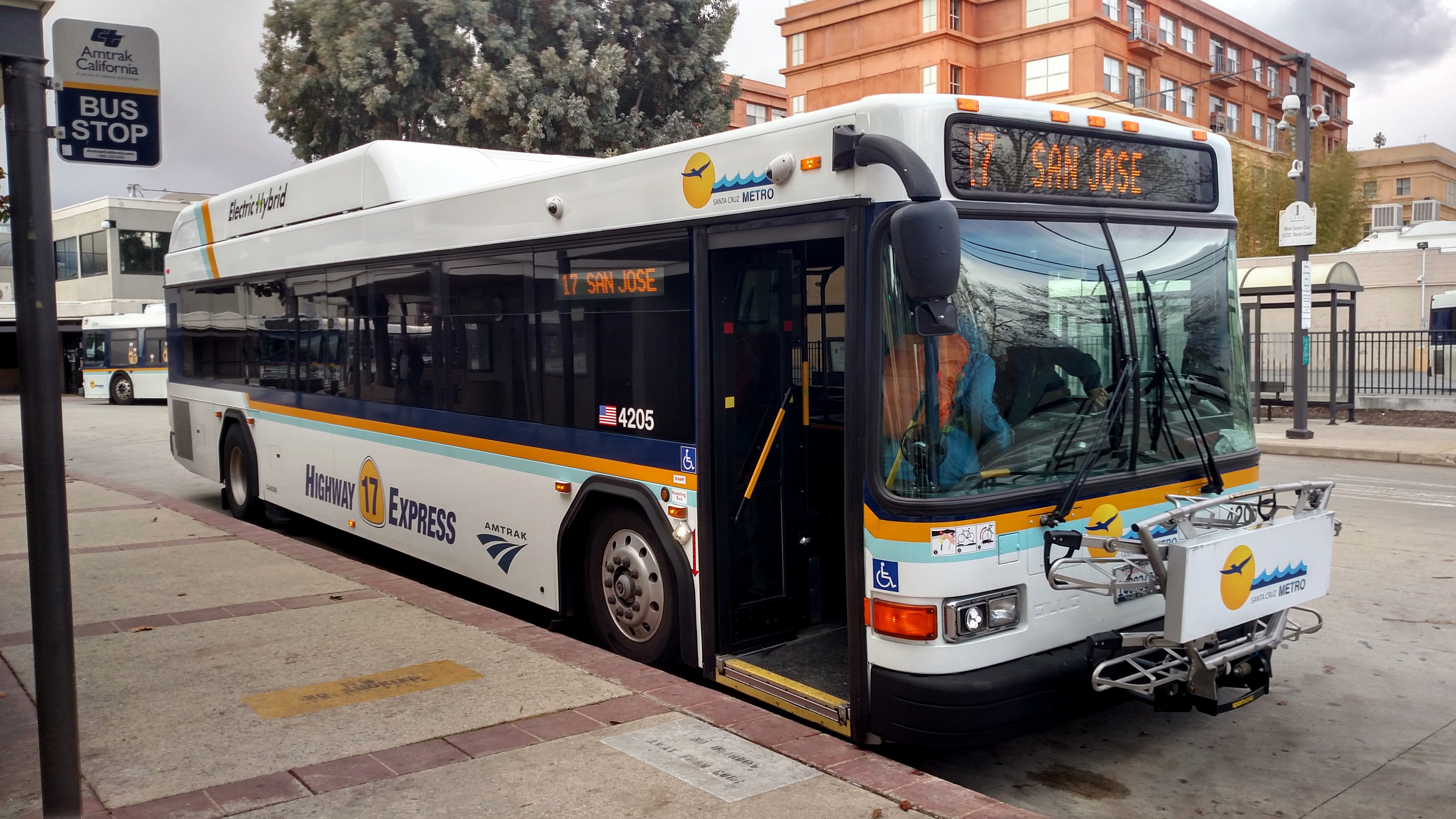
The Highway 17 Express

Greyhound Lines bus service is another, albeit less commonly used, option for visiting Santa Cruz.

Santa Cruz has an extensive network of bike lanes and bike paths. Most major roads have bike lanes, and wide bike lanes were recently installed on Beach Street, near the Santa Cruz Beach Boardwalk. Additionally, there are levee bike paths along the San Lorenzo River. A Rail Trail – a bicycle and pedestrian path beside an existing coastal train track—is under consideration.

The Santa Cruz, Big Trees and Pacific Railway operates diesel-electric tourist trains between the Santa Cruz Beach Boardwalk and Roaring Camp in Felton, through Henry Cowell Redwoods State Park, with its famous Redwood Grove walking trail.

The Santa Cruz Railroad was a narrow gauge railroad that operated between Santa Cruz and Pajaro.

=== Water ===
The main water source for Santa Cruz is the Loch Lomond Reservoir. Additional sources include groundwater wells, and some coastal streams.

=== Public safety ===
A 2013 article in the Santa Cruz Sentinel noted that according to FBI statistics, Santa Cruz had the highest property crime rates per capita for medium and large-sized cities in the state of California, in addition to some of the highest violent crime rates in the state of California for medium and large-sized cities. The article noted tourism, police staffing concerns, prolific liquor licenses, widespread availability of drugs, and large numbers of transients as potential causes. The 2019 edition of the FBI's Uniform Crime Reports data published by the Santa Cruz Police Department showed that crime rates had decreased for all crimes except arson when measured against a five-year rolling average.

In 1973, after the discovery of four bodies in Henry Cowell Redwoods State Park, Peter Chang, the district attorney for Santa Cruz County referred to the city as "the murder capital of the world" in an interview. The bodies were later determined to be victims of the serial killer Herbert Mullin.

== Sister cities ==
Sister cities of Santa Cruz are:

- Shingū, Japan (1974)
- Sestri Levante, Italy (1980)
- / (Russia) Alushta, Crimea, Ukraine (1984)
- Jinotepe, Nicaragua (1990)
- Biarritz, France (2022)

Inactive sister city relationships:

- Puerto la Cruz, Venezuela (1966)

== See also ==
- List of people from Santa Cruz, California
- List of birds of Santa Cruz County, California
- List of cities and towns in California
- List of ranchos of California (sortable by city or county)
