= Branciforte =

- Site of Center of Villa de Branciforte
- California Historical Landmark
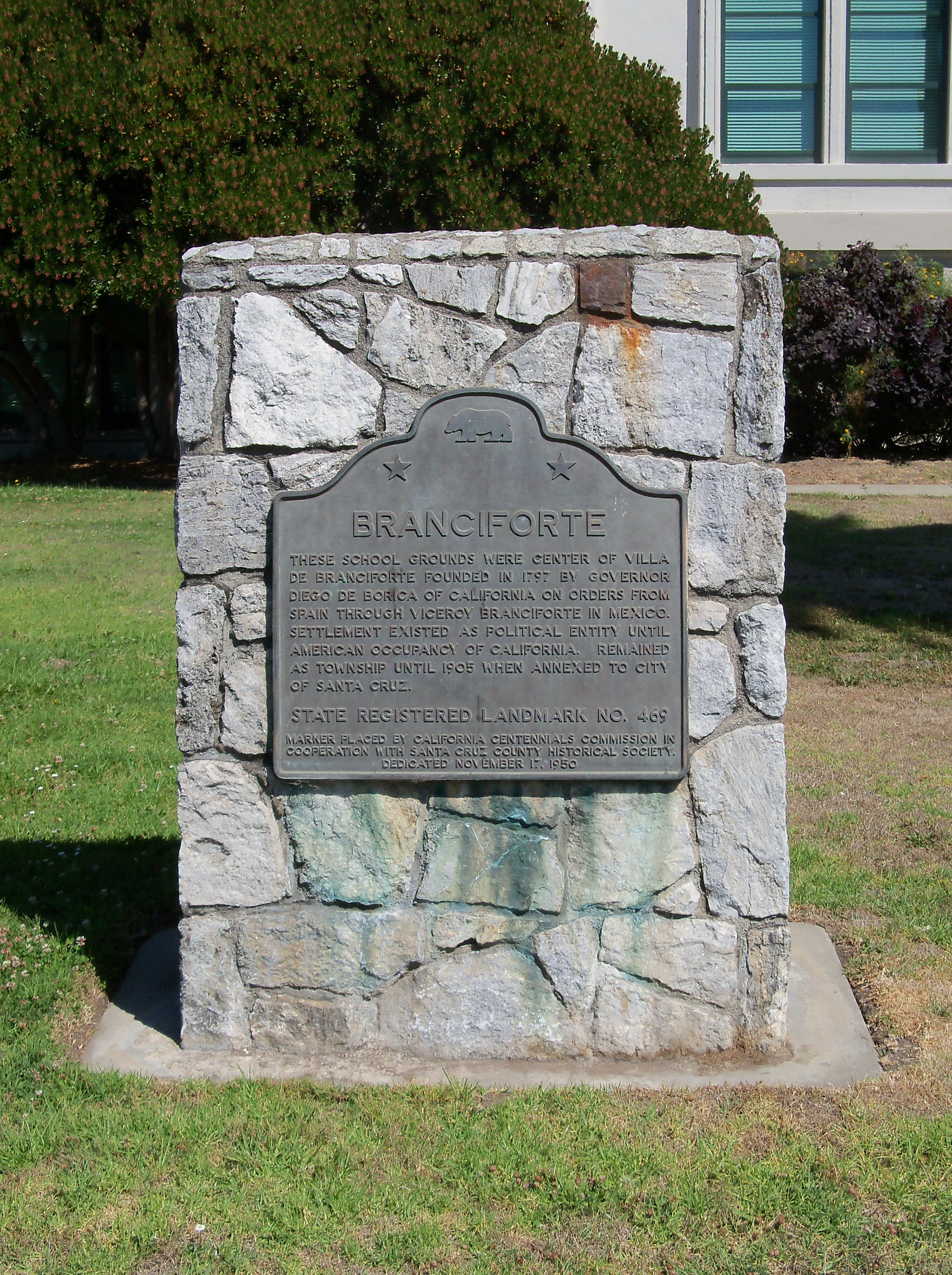

- Location within California
- Location: SW corner of Water and Branciforte, Santa Cruz
- Coordinates: 36.981222°N 122.014028°W
- CHISL No.: 469
- Added to NRHP: August 30, 1950

Branciforte, formally Villa de Branciforte or Pueblo de Branciforte, was the third and last of only three secular pueblos founded by the Spanish colonial government of Alta California (the others were the El Pueblo de Los Ángeles and El Pueblo de San José de Guadalupe). The pueblo was established in 1797 on the eastern bluff of the San Lorenzo River, facing Mission Santa Cruz on the west side of the river, in modern-day Santa Cruz, California. The pueblo never prospered, and the area was annexed into the city of Santa Cruz, California in 1905.

The present day Branciforte Small Schools Campus (BSSC) building is located at what was the center of the Villa de Branciforte. A California State historical marker, number 469, is located outside of the building, too, at the corner of Water Street and Branciforte Avenue.

== History ==
Branciforte was founded under the direction of California Governor Diego de Borica in memory of a Viceroy of New Spain, Miguel de la Grúa Talamanca, 1st Marquis of Branciforte, and was founded as part of Spain's strategy to protect upper California against other European countries such as Russia, England, and France. Its original civilian population was not bound to the church or the military. Unlike the Spanish missions, the villa was secular. However, historian Mary Floyd Williams noted that its designation as a villa rather than a pueblo indicated that the settlement was intended to provide reserve military support if called upon. To that end, retiring army veterans were encouraged to settle there.

In 1781, Governor Felipe de Neve had issued rules regarding governance of secular pueblos (only two at that time; San José and Los Ángeles), the "Regulations for the Government of the Province of the Californias" (Reglamento para el gobierno de la provincia de Californias). Those rules included locally elected officials (subject to approval by the governor): the alcalde (combined mayor and judge), the ayuntamiento (town council), the juez de paz (justice of the peace), and others.

From its very inception in 1797 the Villa met with great obstacles. The funds were not adequate, and the enterprise failed to attract any retired soldiers. In their stead, a motley group of convicts who were banished from New Spain formed the initial group of colonists, and although the missionaries at Mission Santa Cruz protested bitterly against this pueblo being situated so close to their domain, the town received official backing.

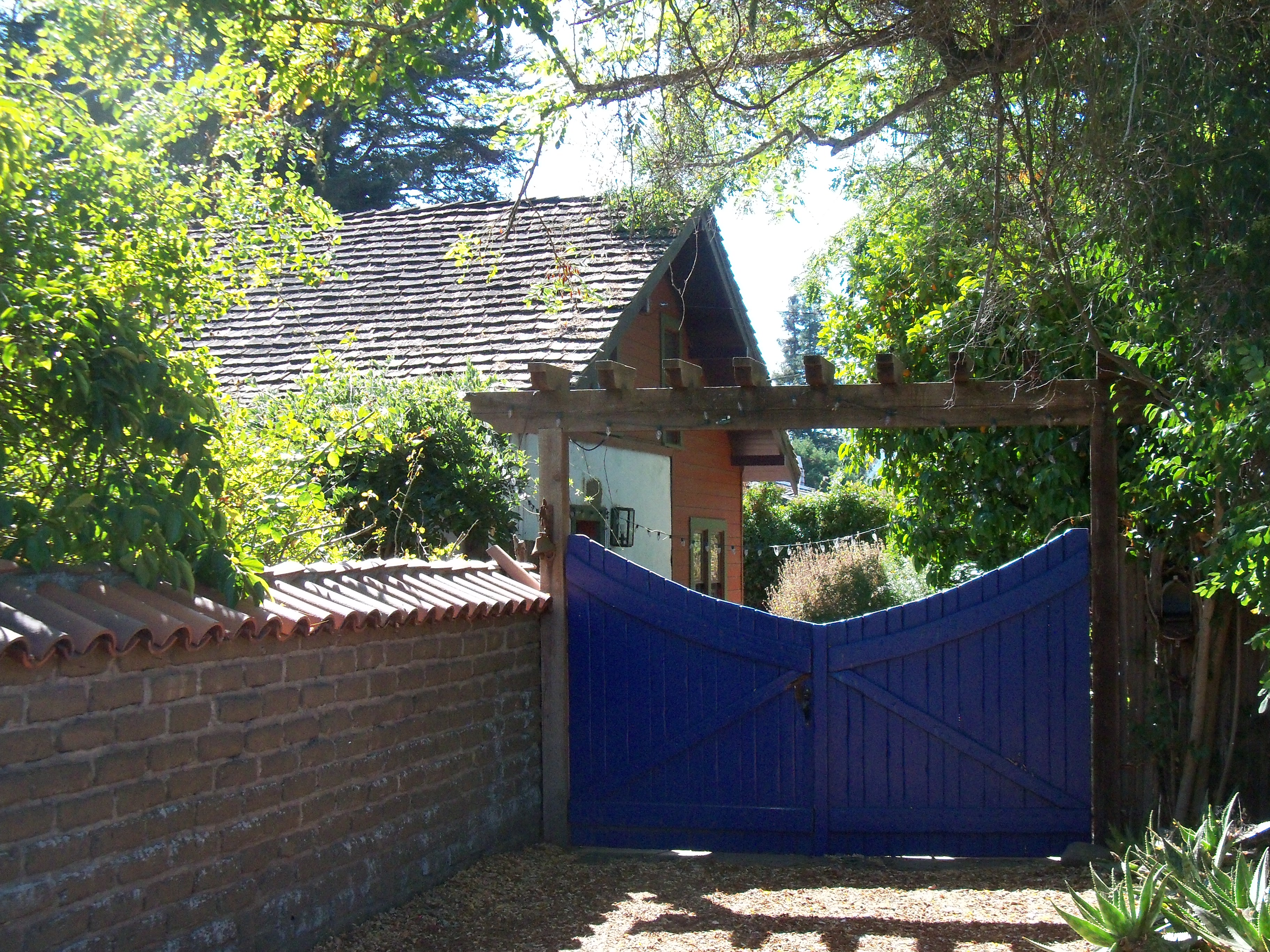
The Branciforte Adobe, built in 1803.

The first eight settlers came from Guadalajara, Jalisco, New Spain (Spanish colonial Mexico). They found nothing of what they had been promised. Expecting to find the town already built to accommodate them, they found they had to build their own rough dwellings with little tools or provisions. In the end the Villa de Branciforte never resembled the neatly laid out plans for streets and buildings its planners envisioned. Furthermore, it never lived up to its expectations, and in 1802, the town itself lost the support of the Crown, and supplies ceased to arrive.

In 1803, about five years after the villa was established the settlers attempted to establish a government by electing an alcalde or municipal magistrate. This election was one of the first elections ever held in Alta California. After this, the citizens of the Villa de Branciforte began to spread over the country.

Ever since the first days, many of its residents, whom the narratives and chronicles denounce as "lazy" and prone to vices and crime, decided to move to other, more prosperous settlements like the Pueblo of San José. There were also constant problems with the missionaries at the adjacent Mission Santa Cruz over grazing rights, and the corrupting influence of the settlers on the neophytes at the Mission. For the first few years the population actually declined.

In 1818, when the pirate Hippolyte de Bouchard threatened to attack the California coast in support of the independence struggles raging in the Americas, the residents of Branciforte were reluctantly called upon to defend the Mission against sacking while the padres and neophytes took flight to other Missions further inland. When Bouchard arrived, he did not sack Santa Cruz but instead it was the residents of Branciforte who looted and stole from the mission even the clothes from the saints adorning the church. The missionaries and neophytes came back to find the whole place ransacked, but it was soon discovered who the culprits had really been. This event deepened the mistrust both the communities held for each other.

Following Mexican independence, Branciforte was entitled to be represented by a member of the Diputación de Alta California.

By 1831 however, Branciforte had a population of about two hundred people which was mostly made up of merchants, explorers, and retired soldiers.

The Branciforte Adobe is the only remaining building of Branciforte itself. There are three other period adobes in Santa Cruz County.

== See also ==
- Branciforte Creek
- Spanish colonial pueblos and villas in North America
