= National Register of Historic Places listings in Santa Cruz County, California =

Location of Santa Cruz County in California

This is a list of the National Register of Historic Places listings in Santa Cruz County, California.

This is intended to be a complete list of the properties and districts on the National Register of Historic Places in Santa Cruz County, California, United States. Latitude and longitude coordinates are provided for many National Register properties and districts; these locations may be seen together in an online map.

There are 46 properties and districts listed on the National Register in the county, including 2 National Historic Landmarks. Another four properties were once listed but have been removed.

This National Park Service list is complete through NPS recent listings posted September 4, 2026.

== Current listings ==
| | Name on the Register | Image | Date listed | Location | City or town | Description |
|---|---|---|---|---|---|---|
| 1 | Bank of Santa Cruz County | Bank of Santa Cruz County | March 15, 1982 (#82002273) | 1502 Pacific Ave. 36°58′31″N 122°01′31″W | Santa Cruz | Following the 1989 Loma Prieta earthquake, most of the building was demolished. The two stone-faced exterior walls, however, were saved. A new structure was built behind them. |
| 2 | Bayview Hotel | Bayview Hotel | March 30, 1992 (#92000259) | 8041 Soquel Dr. 36°58′39″N 121°53′58″W | Aptos | Built in 1878 |
| 3 | Godfrey M. Bockius House | Godfrey M. Bockius House | July 13, 1989 (#89000937) | 322 E. Beach St. 36°54′58″N 121°44′51″W | Watsonville | |
| 4 | Branciforte Adobe | Branciforte Adobe | January 31, 1979 (#79000552) | 1351 N. Branciforte Ave. 36°59′23″N 122°00′35″W | Santa Cruz | |
| 5 | Allan Brown Site | | June 25, 1981 (#81000178) | Address Restricted | Santa Cruz | |
| 6 | California Powder Works Bridge | California Powder Works Bridge | February 27, 2015 (#15000279) | Spanning San Lorenzo River at Keystone Way, Paradise Park; 37°00′38″N 122°02′42″W | Santa Cruz | |
| 7 | Carmelita Court | Carmelita Court | March 20, 1986 (#86000456) | 315-321 Main St. 36°57′56″N 122°01′20″W | Santa Cruz | |
| 8 | Jose Joaquin Castro Adobe | Jose Joaquin Castro Adobe | December 12, 1976 (#76000531) | NW of Watsonville at 184 Old Adobe Rd. 36°56′46″N 121°48′40″W | Watsonville | |
| 9 | Cope Row Houses | Cope Row Houses | January 28, 1982 (#82002274) | 412-420 Lincoln St. 36°58′20″N 122°01′49″W | Santa Cruz | located in the Santa Cruz Downtown Historic District |
| 10 | Cowell Lime Works Historic District | Cowell Lime Works Historic District | November 21, 2007 (#07001220) | University of California, Santa Cruz campus; High St. and Glen Coolidge Dr. 36°58′41″N 122°03′08″W | Santa Cruz | On ranch land once owned by the Henry Cowell family, now part of the University of California, Santa Cruz campus |
| 11 | Davenport Jail | Davenport Jail | April 27, 1992 (#92000422) | 1 Center St. 37°00′38″N 122°11′31″W | Davenport | |
| 12 | Felton Covered Bridge | Felton Covered Bridge | June 19, 1973 (#73000451) | Covered Bridge Road; 37°03′03″N 122°04′15″W | Felton | An 1890s wooden covered Brown truss bridge, tallest covered bridge in the U.S., entrance to Felton for 45 years, part of park now. |
| 13 | Felton Presbyterian Church | Felton Presbyterian Church | April 6, 1978 (#78000774) | 6299 Gushee St. 37°03′10″N 122°04′24″W | Felton | |
| 14 | Garfield Park Branch Library | Garfield Park Branch Library | March 26, 1992 (#92000268) | 705 Woodrow Ave. 36°57′29″N 122°02′16″W | Santa Cruz | |
| 15 | Glen Canyon Covered Bridge | Glen Canyon Covered Bridge | May 17, 1984 (#84001194) | Branciforte Dr. 37°00′00″N 122°00′08″W | Santa Cruz | demolished |
| 16 | Golden Gate Villa | Golden Gate Villa | July 24, 1975 (#75000482) | 924 3rd St. 36°58′02″N 122°01′18″W | Santa Cruz | |
| 17 | Grace Episcopal Church | Grace Episcopal Church | December 19, 2006 (#06001158) | 12547 CA 9; 37°07′00″N 122°07′11″W | Boulder Creek | |
| 18 | Hihn Building | Hihn Building | March 20, 1973 (#73000450) | 201 Monterey Ave. 36°58′23″N 121°56′58″W | Capitola | |
| 19 | A. J. Hinds House | A. J. Hinds House | August 25, 1983 (#83001241) | 529 Chestnut St. 36°58′25″N 122°01′48″W | Santa Cruz | located in the Santa Cruz Downtown Historic District |
| 20 | Hotel Metropole | Hotel Metropole | May 23, 1979 (#79000553) | 1111 Pacific Ave. 36°58′19″N 122°01′29″W | Santa Cruz | demolished after 1989 Loma Prieta earthquake |
| 21 | Judge Lee House | Judge Lee House | June 30, 1980 (#80000868) | 128 E. Beach St. 36°54′42″N 121°45′13″W | Watsonville | |
| 22 | Lettunich Building | Lettunich Building | September 24, 1992 (#92001278) | 406 Main St. 36°54′37″N 121°45′19″W | Watsonville | |
| 23 | Live Oak Ranch | Live Oak Ranch | July 10, 1975 (#75000483) | 105 Mentel Ave. 36°58′38″N 121°59′57″W | Santa Cruz | |
| 24 | Looff Carousel and Roller Coaster on the Santa Cruz Beach Boardwalk | Looff Carousel and Roller Coaster on the Santa Cruz Beach Boardwalk | February 27, 1987 (#87000764) | Along Beach St. 36°57′52″N 122°00′51″W | Santa Cruz | |
| 25 | Madison House | Madison House | February 2, 1984 (#84001195) | 335 East Lake; 36°54′57″N 121°45′06″W | Watsonville | |
| 26 | Mansion House Hotel | Mansion House Hotel | August 18, 1983 (#83001242) | 418-424 Main St. 36°54′38″N 121°45′21″W | Watsonville | |
| 27 | Mission Hill Area Historic District | Mission Hill Area Historic District | May 17, 1976 (#76000530) | Mission St. 36°58′39″N 122°01′43″W | Santa Cruz | The present Holy Cross Church was built in 1889, on the site of the original Mission Santa Cruz |
| 28 | Neary-Rodriguez Adobe | Neary-Rodriguez Adobe | February 24, 1975 (#75000484) | 130-134 School St. 36°58′40″N 122°01′39″W | Santa Cruz | part of the Mission Hill Area Historic District |
| 29 | Octagon Building | Octagon Building | March 24, 1971 (#71000193) | Corner of Front and Cooper Sts. 36°58′29″N 122°01′29″W | Santa Cruz | |
| 30 | Old Riverview Historic District | Old Riverview Historic District | January 22, 1988 (#87000626) | Blue Gum Ave., Capitola Ave., Riverview Ave., Riverview Dr., and Wharf Rd. 36°58′27″N 121°57′12″W | Capitola | |
| 31 | Phillipshurst-Riverwood | | August 4, 1983 (#83004369) | CA 9; 37°06′02″N 122°05′58″W | Ben Lomond | |
| 32 | Redman House | Redman House | July 28, 2004 (#04000734) | 1635 W. Beach Dr. 36°53′47″N 121°46′33″W | Watsonville | |
| 33 | Rispin Mansion | Rispin Mansion | March 14, 1991 (#91000286) | 2200 Wharf Rd. 36°58′43″N 121°57′22″W | Capitola | |
| 34 | Elias H. Robinson House | Elias H. Robinson House | January 9, 1998 (#97001634) | 363 Ocean St. 36°58′24″N 122°01′02″W | Santa Cruz | |
| 35 | Sand Hill Bluff Site | | June 20, 2008 (#08000528) | Address Restricted | Santa Cruz | |
| 36 | Santa Cruz Downtown Historic District | Santa Cruz Downtown Historic District | July 27, 1989 (#89001005) | Roughly Rincon St., Church St., Chestnut St., Walnut St., Cedar St., Laurel St., Myrtle St., and Lincoln St. 36°58′15″N 122°02′23″W | Santa Cruz | An 1870s house, typical of this Historic District |
| 37 | Hiram D. Scott House | Hiram D. Scott House | April 13, 1977 (#77000348) | 4603 Scotts Valley Drive; 37°02′57″N 122°01′02″W | Scotts Valley | |
| 38 | Six Sisters-Lawn Way Historic District | Six Sisters-Lawn Way Historic District | May 1, 1987 (#87000623) | Roughly bounded by San Jose Ave., Capitola Ave., and Esplanade; 36°58′21″N 121°57′40″W | Capitola | |
| 39 | Stoesser Block and Annex | Stoesser Block and Annex | April 7, 1983 (#83001243) | 331–341 Main St. 36°54′34″N 121°45′20″W | Watsonville | Demolished prior to 2000. |
| 40 | US Post Office-Santa Cruz Main | US Post Office-Santa Cruz Main | January 11, 1985 (#85000139) | 850 Front St. 36°58′36″N 122°01′35″W | Santa Cruz | |
| 41 | Valencia Hall | Valencia Hall | September 20, 1984 (#84001201) | Valencia Rd. 36°59′47″N 121°51′55″W | Aptos | |
| 42 | Venetian Court Apartments | Venetian Court Apartments | April 2, 1987 (#87000574) | 1500 Wharf Rd. 36°58′22″N 121°57′08″W | Capitola | 1924 condominiums |
| 43 | Veterans Memorial Building | Veterans Memorial Building | April 27, 1992 (#92000423) | 842-846 Front St. 36°58′34″N 122°01′29″W | Santa Cruz | |
| 44 | Watsonville City Plaza | Watsonville City Plaza | August 22, 1983 (#83001244) | Bounded by Main, Peck, Union, and E. Beach Cts. 36°54′37″N 121°45′17″W | Watsonville | |
| 45 | Watsonville-Lee Road Site | Watsonville-Lee Road Site | May 28, 1976 (#76000532) | Address Restricted | Watsonville | |
| 46 | Wee Kirk | Wee Kirk | October 12, 2017 (#100001730) | 9500 Central Ave. 37°05′26″N 122°05′24″W | Ben Lomond | |

== Former listings ==
| | Name on the Register | Image | Date listed | Date removed | Location | City or town | Description |
|---|---|---|---|---|---|---|---|
| 1 | Headquarters Administration Building | Headquarters Administration Building | December 22, 2015 (#15000914) | December 28, 2023 | 21600 Big Basin Way, Big Basin Redwoods State Park; 37°10′19″N 122°13′20″W | Boulder Creek | Burned 2020, in CZU Lightning Complex fires |
| 2 | Lower Sky Meadow Residential Area Historic District | | September 24, 2014 (#14000662) | December 28, 2023 | 7, 8, 9, 10, 14, 15 & 16 Sky Meadow Ln. 37°10′57″N 122°12′20″W | Boulder Creek | Burned 2020, in CZU Lightning Complex fires |
| 3 | McHugh and Bianchi Building | | September 27, 1972 (#72001551) | October 1, 1974 | Pacific Ave. and Mission St. | Santa Cruz | Also known as the Hotaling Building. Demolished in August 1974. |
| 4 | Pacific Avenue Historic District | Pacific Avenue Historic District | February 4, 1987 (#87000004) | April 21, 1992 | Roughly bounded by Pacific Ave., Water, Front, and Cathcart Sts. | Santa Cruz | Removed after destruction of majority of contributing properties during the Loma Prieta earthquake |

== See also ==
- List of National Historic Landmarks in California
- National Register of Historic Places listings in California
- California Historical Landmarks in Santa Cruz County, California
