= California Historical Landmarks in Santa Cruz County =

List table of the properties and districts listed on the California Historical Landmarks within Santa Cruz County, California.

- Note: Click the "Map of all coordinates" link to the right to view a Google map of all properties and districts with latitude and longitude coordinates in the table below.

== Listings ==
Image		Landmark name	Location	City or town	Summary
Big Basin Redwoods State Park	827	Big Basin Redwoods State Park	Big Basin Redwoods State Park; 37°10′21″N 122°13′21″W	Boulder Creek	
Castro Adobe	998	Castro Adobe	184 Old Adobe Rd. 36°56′45″N 121°48′40″W	Watsonville	Also on the NRHP list as NPS-76000531
Felton Covered Bridge	583	Felton Covered Bridge	Covered Bridge Rd. and Graham Hill Rd. 37°03′03″N 122°04′15″W	Felton	
Glenwood	449	Glenwood	4171 Glenwood Dr. 37°06′29″N 121°59′08″W	Scotts Valley	
Mission Santa Cruz	342	Mission Santa Cruz	Plaza Park; 36°58′39″N 122°01′43″W	Santa Cruz	Also on the NRHP list as NPS-76000530
Mystery Spot	1055	Mystery Spot	465 Mystery Spot Rd; 37°00′45″N 122°00′06″W	Santa Cruz	
Santa Cruz Beach Boardwalk	983	Santa Cruz Beach Boardwalk	400 Beach St. 36°57′51″N 122°01′04″W	Santa Cruz	
Hihn Building	860	Hihn Building	201 Monterey Ave. 36°58′22″N 121°57′02″W	Capitola	
Villa de Branciforte	469	Villa de Branciforte	Water and Branciforte; 36°59′00″N 122°01′00″W	Santa Cruz	

== See also ==
- List of California Historical Landmarks
- National Register of Historic Places listings in Santa Cruz County, California
