= Mystery Shack =

Mystery Shack may refer to:

- "Mystery Shack", a fictional tourist trap in the animated series Gravity Falls.
- Mystery Shack, a tourist attraction in Calico, California.

== See also ==
- Mystery Spot
