= Santa Cruz Downtown Historic District =

- U.S. National Register of Historic Places
- U.S. Historic district
- California Historical Landmark
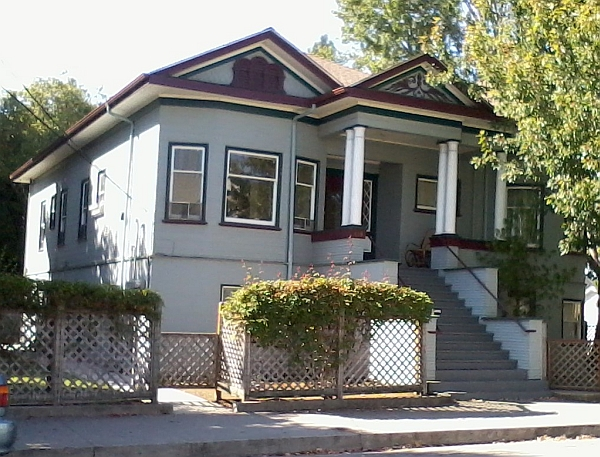
- Cope House (1870s Victorian) at 249 Walnut Avenue in the Santa Cruz Downtown Historic District

- Location within California
- Location: Roughly bound by Rincon, Church, Chestnut, Walnut, Cedar, Laurel, Myrtle, and Lincoln Streets, Santa Cruz, California, U.S.
- Coordinates: 36.970833°N 122.039722°W
- Area: 52 acres (21 ha)
- Architectural style: Stick/Eastlake, Italianate, Queen Anne
- NRHP reference No.: 89001005
- CHISL No.: N1606

Significant dates
- Added to NRHP: July 27, 1989
- Designated CHISL: July 27, 1989

Santa Cruz Downtown Historic District is a historic district featuring the oldest residential area in Santa Cruz, California. It is listed on the National Register of Historic Places since July 27, 1989; and listed as a California Historical Landmark since July 27, 1989.

== About ==
The historic district is 52 acres (21 ha) in area and contains 186 contributing buildings and, 32 non-contributing buildings. The area is roughly bound by Rincon, Church, Chestnut, Walnut, Cedar, Laurel, Myrtle, and Lincoln Streets in what is considered downtown Santa Cruz. Most of the homes in this area were built between 1860 and 1938, in the Stick/Eastlake, Italianate, Queen Anne styles.

== History ==
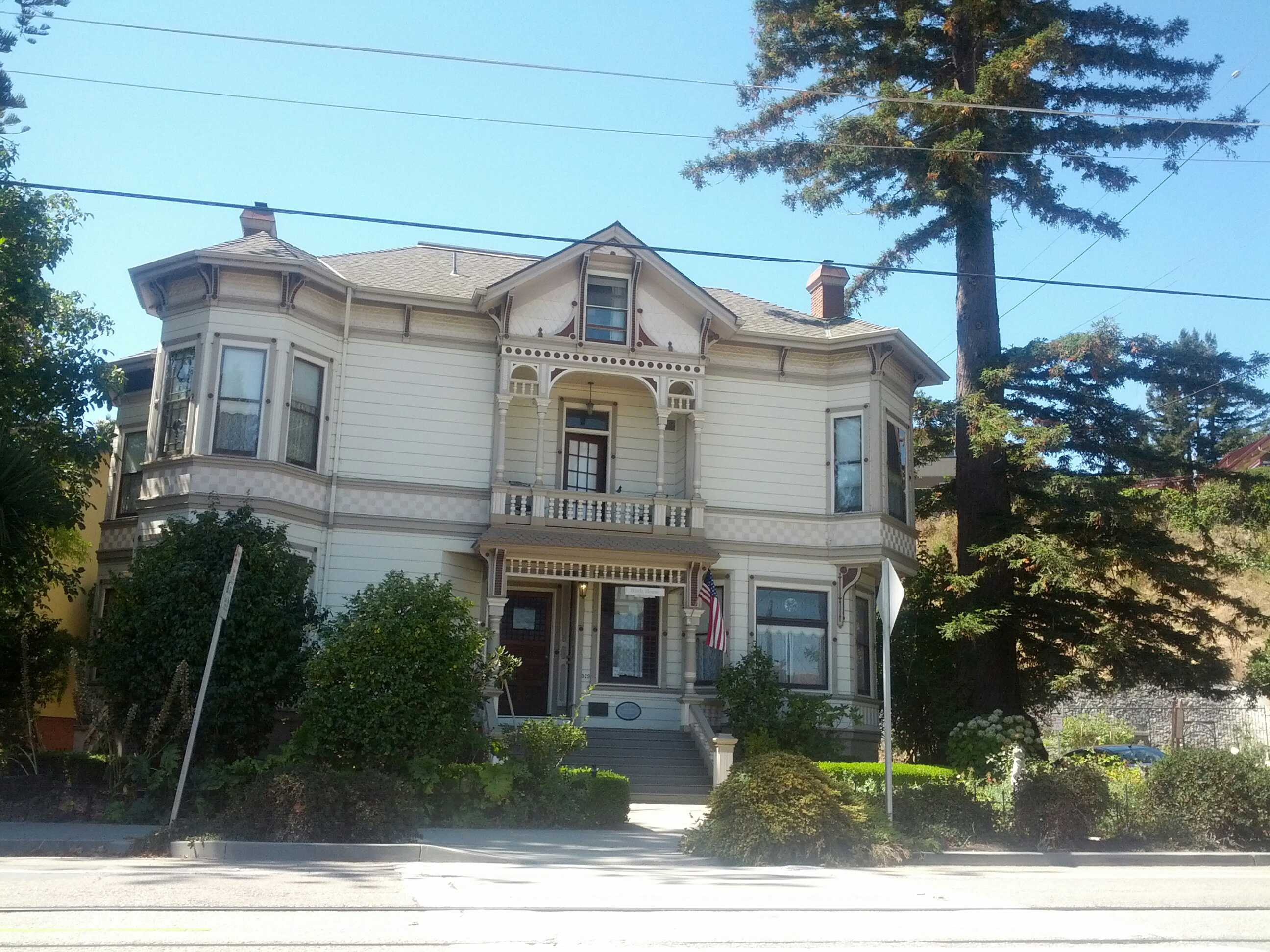
Hinds House (1888)

In 1848, Elihu Anthony bought the land south of Water Street between Front Street and the San Lorenzo River. He built the first business in that part of town at North Pacific, Water, and Mission streets, and he sold the rest of the lots. Within a couple of years, commerce grew on Front Street. In the 1850s Frederick A. Hihn owned much of the old Mission garden between Mission Hill and Beach Hill (the area comprising the Downtown Historic District), and during the prosperous gold rush years of the 1850s he had developed and laid plans for much of the land north of Lincoln Street. In 1865, Elihu Anthony and Frederick A. Hihn set up a common water system in the town, facilitating further growth.

By the mid-1860s the city development started of the first tourist hotels, beach houses, summer cottages, and the Leibbrandt's Dolphin Bath House. The population grew by another fifty percent in the 1870s. After 1875, Pacific Street starts to experience a building boom.

In the 1870s, the Santa Cruz & Felton Railroad and the Santa Cruz Railroad are built connecting Santa Cruz to larger cities, which increased accessibility particularly for tourists. In 1884, Neptune Baths and the first roller coaster were built on the beach. In 1887 the Sea Beach Hotel was expanded. By the 1890s, very little growth was happening in the city, however infill within the Santa Cruz Downtown Historic District continues until 1938.

== List of notable buildings ==
- Cope Row Houses (1894) 412–420 Lincoln Street; listed separately on the NRHP
- Hinds House (1888), 529 Chestnut Street; listed separately on the NRHP

== See also ==
- National Register of Historic Places listings in Santa Cruz County, California
