= Naomi Hirahara =

American journalist (born 1962)

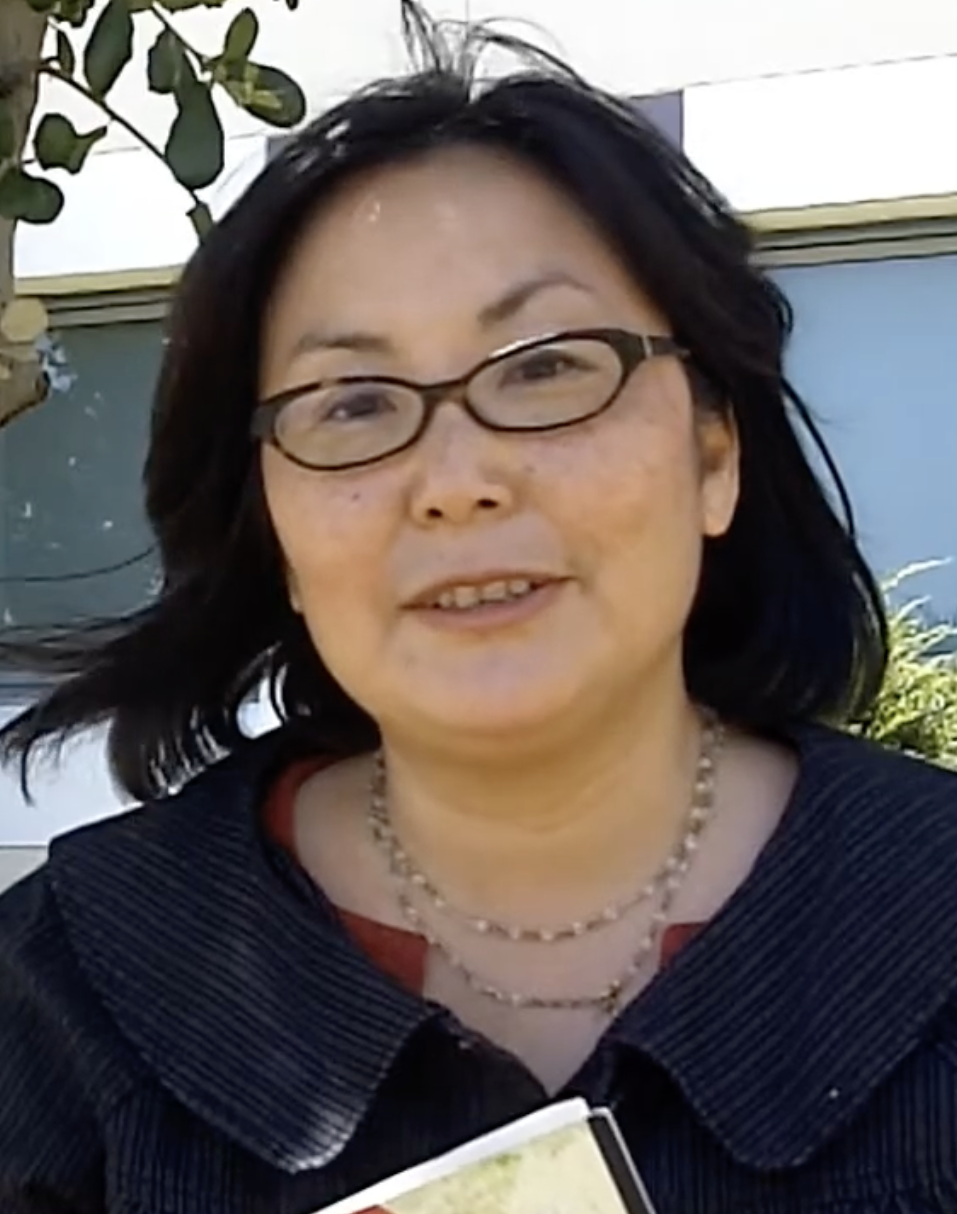
- Hirahara in 2011
- Born: 1962 (age 63–64); Pasadena, California, U.S.
- Education: Stanford University, Inter-University Center for Japanese Language Studies
- Occupations: Author, journalist
- Writing career
- Years active: 1990s–present
- Genres: Mystery fiction, non-fiction
- Notable awards: Edgar Award
- Website: naomihirahara.com

Naomi Hirahara (Japanese: 平原 直美, born 1962) is an American mystery writer and journalist. She edited the largest Japanese-American daily newspaper, Rafu Shimpo, for several years. She is currently a writer of both fiction and non-fiction works and the Edgar Award-winning Mas Arai mystery series.

== Biography ==
Naomi Hirahara was born in 1962 in Pasadena, California, to father, Isamu, Kibei born in Watsonville, and mother, Mayumi, born in Hiroshima. Both parents were survivors of the Hiroshima bombing. She began writing when she was in elementary school in Altadena, California. She received her bachelor's degree from Stanford University in international relations with a focus on Africa and spent a summer during her studies volunteering with the YWCA in Ghana. After her 1983 graduation, she furthered her education at the Inter-University Center for Japanese Language Studies in Tokyo.

After a brief job as an editorial assistant, Hirahara began working at the Rafu Shimpo newspaper in 1984, as a writer about the city of Los Angeles. Three years later, she began working at a boutique public relations firm to allow more time for creative writing and taking classes at the UCLA extension. After three years, she was asked to come back as an editor at the Rafu Shimpo. She began writing nonfiction books in the 1990s. In 1996, Hirahara quit her job, took a fellowship for creative writing with the Milton Center at Newman University in Wichita, Kansas and committed to working full-time as a creative writer. In 2001, she published a non-fiction work, Green Makers: Japanese American Gardeners in Southern California and later that year published An American Son: The Story of George Aratani, Founder of Mikasa and Kenwood. In 2002, Distinguished Asian American Business Leaders was released.

She sold her first fiction book, Summer of the Big Bachi, in 2003. It received a positive review in the Chicago Tribune, which later that year named it one of the "10 best mysteries and thrillers of 2004". Publishers Weekly named it one of the "Best Books of 2004". The book turned out to be the first of a series about an aging Japanese-American gardener, Mas Arai, a survivor of the atomic bomb, but the character was American-born. Though he has a college degree, racial prejudice prevents him from obtaining other work, and he becomes a gardener, mirroring Hirahara's father's experience. Mas Arai became the featured character in Gasa Gasa Girl, Snakeskin Shamishen, Blood Hina and Strawberry Yellow. (Strawberry Yellow takes place in Watsonville, California and at the Redman Hirahara Farmstead.) In 2007, the third book in her series, Snakeskin Shamishen won the Edgar Award from the Mystery Writers of America. The following year, the series began being released in Japan.

In 2014, Hirahara began a new series, though Mas Arai's story has at least two more chapters. The new series features a young bicycle policewoman, Ellie Rush, who is the central character in Hirahara's seventh novel, Murder on Bamboo Lane. While the Arai series focuses on California centered around the World War II generation, the Rush series is contemporary and expands on Hirahara's desire to speak from a woman's point of view. Her first book in which the main character was a woman was a juvenile fiction work, 1001 Cranes, published in 2008. Her most recent book in the Ellie Rush series, Grave on Grand Avenue (2015) has received positive reviews, and has been featured as a "Best Book" by Publishers Weekly. Her next book, Crown City, is being released February 2026.

== Awards and honors ==
Summer of the Big Bachi was named one of the "10 best mysteries and thrillers of 2004" by the Chicago Tribune, as well as one of the "Best Books of 2004" by Publishers Weekly.

In 2019, CrimeReads included Iced in Paradise in their list of the year's best traditional mystery novels. Two years later, they included Clark and Division on their list of the year's best crime novels. Amazon also included the novel on their list of the year's best Mysteries and Thrillers.

Awards for Hirahara's writing
Year	Title	Award	Result	Ref.
2005	Summer of the Big Bachi	Macavity Award for Best First Novel	Finalist	
2007	Snakeskin Shamisen	Anthony Award for Best Paperback Original	Finalist	
2007	Snakeskin Shamisen	Edgar Allan Poe Award for Best Paperback Original	Winner	
2014	Murder on Bamboo Lane	T. Jefferson Parker Mystery Award	Finalist	
2019	Hiroshima Boy	Anthony Award for Best Paperback Original	Finalist	
2019	Hiroshima Boy	Edgar Allan Poe Award for Best Paperback Original	Finalist	
2019	Hiroshima Boy	Macavity Award for Best Mystery Novel	Finalist	
2022	Clark and Division	Agatha Award for Best Historical Novel	Finalist	
2022	Clark and Division	Anthony Award for Best Novel	Finalist	
2022	Clark and Division	Lefty Award for Best Historical Mystery	Winner	
2022	Clark and Division	Simon & Schuster Mary Higgins Clark Award	Winner	
2022	Clark and Division	Sue Feder Historical Mystery Award	Winner	

== Selected works ==
=== Mas Arai series ===
- Summer of the Big Bachi. Random House Publishing Group. 2004. ISBN 978-0-440-33489-7.
- Gasa-Gasa Girl. Random House Publishing Group. 2005. ISBN 978-0-440-33532-0.
- Snakeskin Shamisen. Random House Publishing Group. 2006. ISBN 978-0-440-33589-4.
- Blood Hina. Altadena, California: Prospect Park Books. 2010. ISBN 978-1-938849-19-0.
- Strawberry yellow. Altadena, California: Prospect Park Books. 2013. ISBN 978-1-938849-02-2.
- Sayonara slam. Altadena, California: Prospect Park Books. 2016. ISBN 978-1-938849-73-2.
- Hiroshima boy. Altadena, California: Prospect Park Books. 2018. ISBN 978-1-945551-09-3.

=== Ellie Rush series ===
- Murder on Bamboo Lane. Penguin Publishing Group. 2014. ISBN 978-1-101-60945-3.
- Grave on Grand Avenue. Penguin Publishing Group. 2015. ISBN 978-1-101-60946-0.

=== Leilani Santiago series ===
- Iced in paradise: A Leilani Santiago Hawai'i mystery. Altadena, California: Prospect Park Books. 2019. ISBN 978-1-945551-63-5.
- An Eternal Lei: A Leilani Santiago Hawai'i mystery. Prospect Park Books/Turner Publishing. 2022.

=== A Japantown Mystery series ===
- Clark and Division. Soho Crime. 2021. ISBN 978-1641292498.
- Evergreen. Soho Crime. 2023. ISBN 9781641293594.
- Crown City. New York, NY: Soho Crime. 2026. ISBN 978-1-64129-608-3.

=== Other fiction ===
- 1001 Cranes. Random House Children's Books. 2008. ISBN 978-0-375-84881-0.
- South Central noir, Akashic Books 2022.

=== Non-fiction ===
- Hirahara, Naomi (2000). Greenmakers = Japanese: グリーンメーカーズ: Japanese American gardeners in Southern California (in English and Japanese). Los Angeles, California: Southern California Gardeners' Federation. ISBN 978-0-970-48160-3.
- Hirahara, Naomi (2001). An American Son: The Story of George Aratani : Founder of Mikasa and Kenwood. Japanese Amer National Museum. ISBN 978-1-881161-15-8.
- Hirahara, Naomi (2003). Distinguished Asian American Business Leaders. Greenwood Publishing Group. ISBN 978-1-57356-344-4.
- Hirahara, Naomi; Jensen, Gwenn M. (2004). Silent Scars of Healing Hands: Oral Histories of Japanese American Doctors in World War II Detention Camps. Center for Oral and Public History, California State University. ISBN 978-0-930046-22-4.
- Hirahara, Naomi (2004). A Scent of Flowers: The History of the Southern California Flower Market, 1912-2004. Midori Books. ISBN 978-0-9749697-0-1.
- Hirahara, Naomi; Tominaga, Kazuko (2008). Japanese: ガサガサ・ガール: 庭師マス・アライ事件簿 (in Japanese). Tōkyō: Shōgakkan. ISBN 978-4-094-08198-5.
- Hirahara, Naomi; Tominaga, Kazuko (2008). Japanese: スネークスキン三味線 / (in Japanese). Tōkyō: Shōgakukan. ISBN 978-4-094-08197-8.
- Hirahara, Naomi; Knatz, Geraldine; Lynxwiler, J Eric (2014). Terminal Island: Lost Communities of Los Angeles Harbor. Angel City Press. ISBN 978-1-62640-018-4.
- Hirahara, Naomi; Lindquist, Heather C. (2018). Life after Manzanar. Berkeley, California: Heyday. ISBN 978-1-597144-00-1.
- Hirahara Naomi and Illi Ferandez. We Are Here : 30 Inspiring Asian Americans and Pacific Islanders Who Have Shaped the United States. First ed. Running Press Kids 2022.
