= Headquarters Administration Building (Big Basin Redwoods State Park) =

- Formerly listed on the U.S. National Register of Historic Places
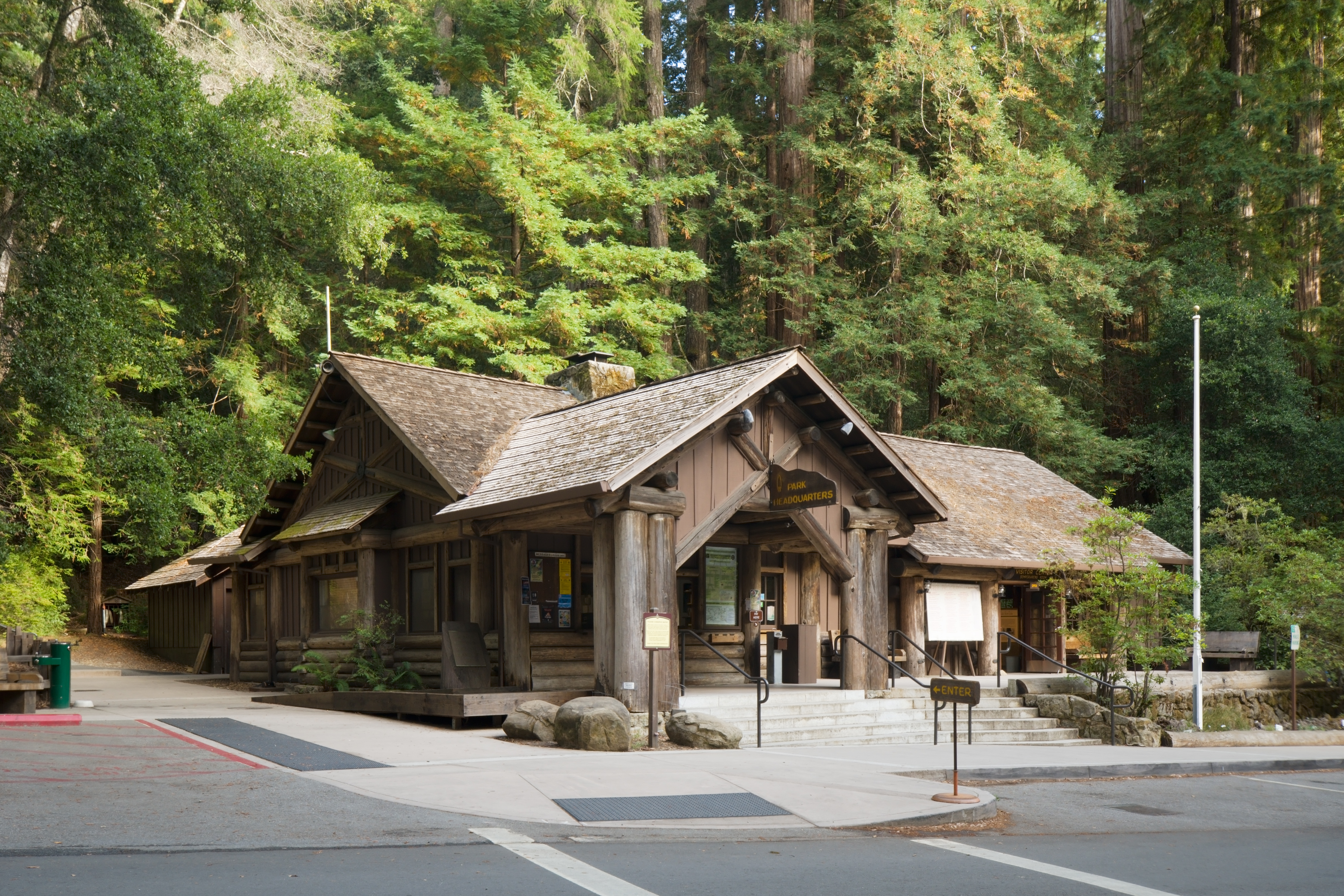

- Location within California Location within the United States
- Location: Big Basin Redwoods State Park
- Coordinates: 37°10′19″N 122°13′20″W
- Built: 1936
- Architectural style: Park Rustic
- Demolished: 2020 (by wildfire)
- NRHP reference No.: 15000914

Significant dates
- Added to NRHP: December 20, 2015
- Removed from NRHP: December 28, 2023

The Headquarters Administration Building of Big Basin Redwoods State Park, Santa Cruz County, California, was a historic structure built in 1936 by crews of the Civilian Conservation Corps. It was built out of local materials (redwood logs and stone), and was one of the best-preserved examples of the CCC's work in the California state park system. The building continued to perform its original function, housing the park's administrative offices and serving as a contact point for park visitors, until it was destroyed by the wildfires sparked by the lightning storm of August 16, 2020. It was listed on the National Register of Historic Places in 2017, and was delisted in 2023.

== See also ==
- National Register of Historic Places listings in Santa Cruz County, California
