= Oregon Vortex =

Roadside attraction in Gold Hill, Oregon, US

The Oregon Vortex
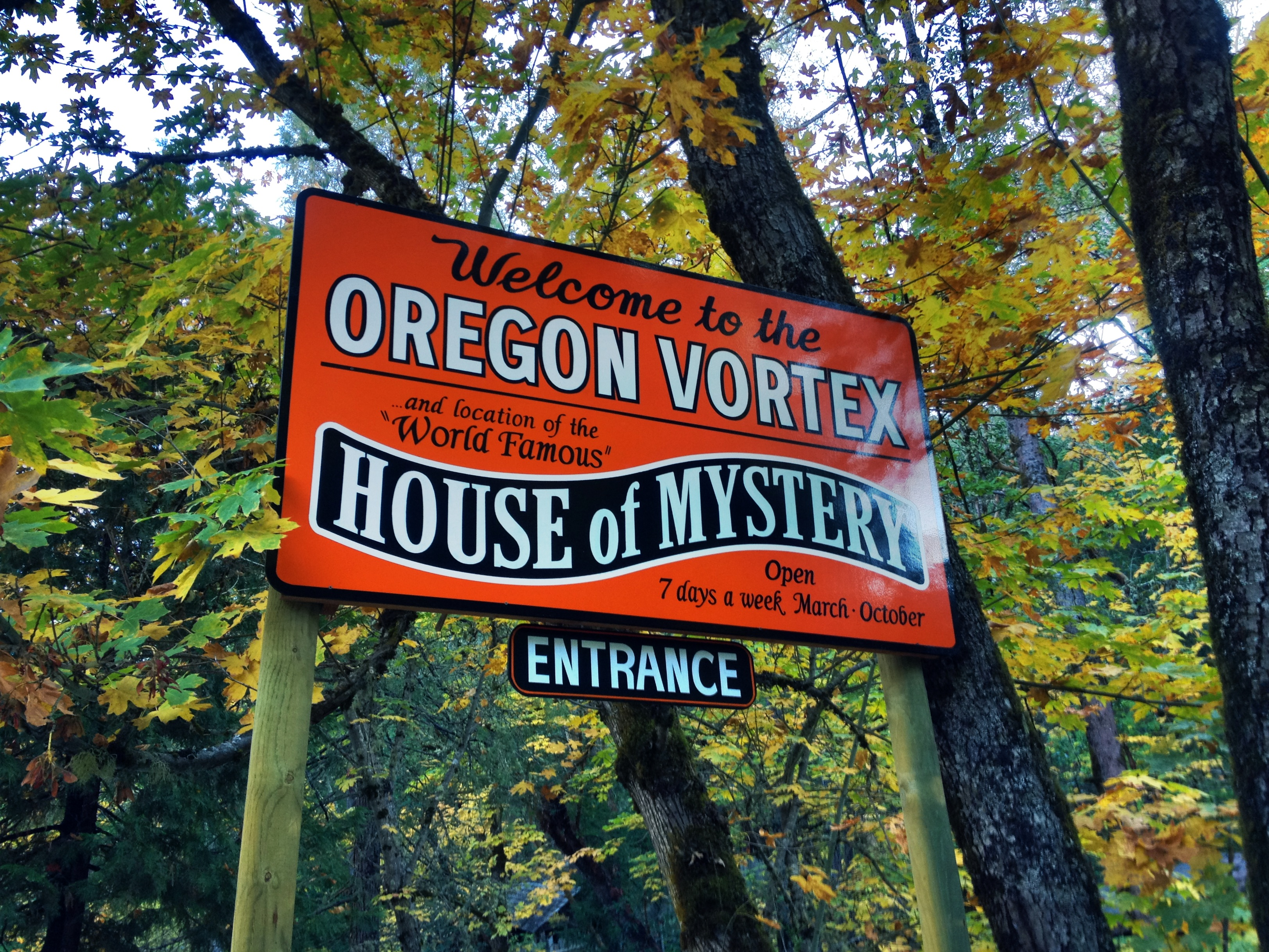
- Interactive map of The Oregon Vortex
- Nearest city: Gold Hill, Oregon U.S.
- Coordinates: 42.4931°N 123.0851°W

The Oregon Vortex is a roadside attraction that opened to tourists in 1930, located on Sardine Creek in Gold Hill, Oregon, in the United States. It consists of a number of interesting effects, which are gravity hill optical illusions, but which the attraction's proprietors propose are the result of paranormal properties of the area.

The attraction is temporarily closed following damage caused by flooding of nearby Sardine Creek in March 2025, which overflowed its banks, sending water through parts of the property and leaving mud, debris, and structural damage to the facility; the owners aim to reopen in March 2027.

== Background ==
Local legend supposedly states that prior to any construction in the area, Native Americans in the area referred to the site as a "forbidden" land, and travelers passing through would often find their horses refusing to go through the area.

The story goes that a gold assay office was built in the area in 1904 by the Old Grey Eagle Mining Company, which slid from its foundation in the early tens, coming to rest at an odd angle. However, the building conforms to other purpose-built distorting rooms or "crazy houses" such as at the Santa Cruz Mystery Spot. In 1914, the outpost and assay house were rediscovered by a prospector named William McCollugh. McCollugh convinced his friend, geologist and engineer John Litster to come to the US from his birthplace in Alva, Scotland. Litster says he researched the paranormal phenomena of the so-called 165-foot magnet radius.

When the very similar Mystery Spot was created in Santa Cruz, California in 1939, Litster sued for copyright violations, but withdrew the suit when it was pointed out that he claimed the Oregon Vortex was a natural phenomenon.

When Litster died in 1959, his wife sold the Oregon Vortex to Ernie and Irene Cooper. The Coopers' daughter Maria and grandson Mark kept the attraction open since then, making it one of Oregon's oldest examples of roadside Americana.

Odd angles create an illusion of objects seemingly rolling uphill. The same effect can be seen in The Montana Vortex and house of mystery, Pennsylvania's Laurel Caverns, North Carolina's Mystery Hill, and at Santa Cruz, California's Mystery Spot. Two UC Berkeley researchers studied the Santa Cruz Mystery Spot and published their conclusions in Psychological Science in 1999. They proposed a framework called "orientation framing" which describes how the brain's visual processing uses spatial frames of reference. They noted similar illusions including the Ponzo illusion, the Zöllner illusion, the Poggendorf and Wündt-Hering illusions. James Randi, magician and illusionist, also described the Oregon Vortex (House of Mystery) as an optical illusion in 1998 using photography and mathematics to describe the illusion. Russ Donnelly, professor emeritus of physics at the University of Oregon visited the Oregon Vortex in 1966 and was convinced it was some sort of optical illusion. Owner Maria Cooper agreed with Donnelly that what people are seeing inside the House of Mystery is an optical illusion but insisted something else was happening outside the house that makes people's height appear to grow and shrink depending on their location.

Oregon Vortex is also famous for "height change" as the apparent relative height of two people varies, depending on where each stands. The explanation of the strange phenomena is that they are caused by optical illusions. Distorted backgrounds that induce a forced perspective, as with an Ames room. The Oregon site also exhibits phenomena similar to those perceived by visitors at the mystery spot located outside St. Ignace in the upper peninsula of Michigan.

== In popular culture ==
- The site was investigated on a second-season episode of the SyFy reality show Fact or Faked: Paranormal Files, and although there seemed to be a small debate between the show's investigators over the "height change" phenomenon, they ultimately concluded that overall, all of the effects demonstrated were optical illusions.
- The Oregon Vortex was referenced in the 1999 episode of The X-Files, Rush.
- The attraction is an inspiration for the Mystery Shack, a tourist trap and the main setting for the Disney Channel (later Disney XD) original series Gravity Falls.
- Mentioned in Season 3 Episode 11 of Supernatural in relation to the mystery spot being investigated and alongside The Bermuda Triangle
- Visited in Season 15 Episode 1 of Ghost Adventures "Golden Ghost Town" prior to the overnight investigation in Golden. Whilst there, Zak and Aaron witness a broom being perfectly balanced by the tip of its brush.
- Mentioned in Stranger Than Science by Frank Edwards using glass balls as an example.
- The "Questionable Area" in Psychonauts 2 was inspired by this attraction.
