= Redman Hirahara Farmstead =

Building complex in the United States

- Redman House
- U.S. National Register of Historic Places
- California Historical Landmark
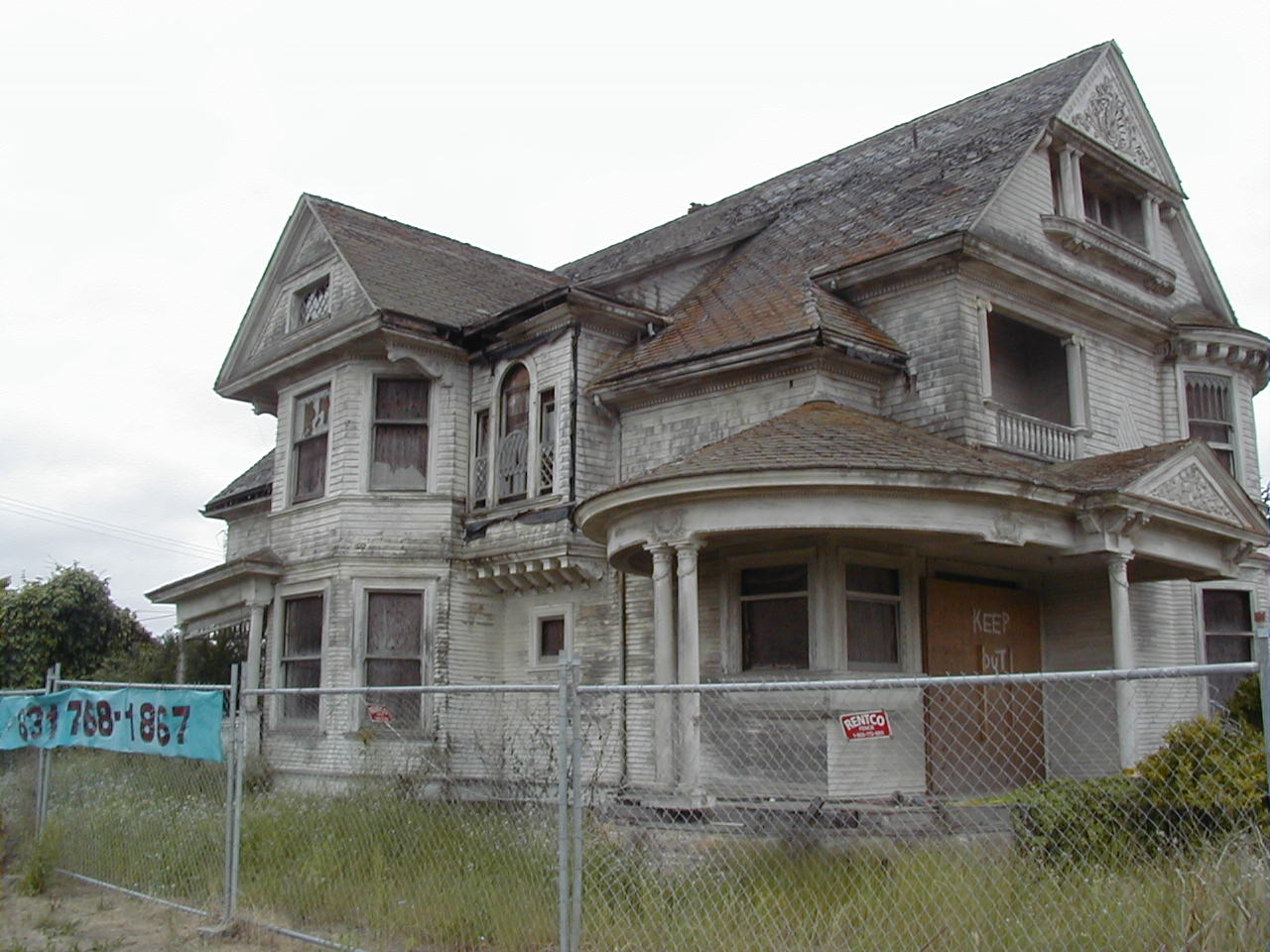
- Redman Hirahara House in 2026, designed by W. H. Weeks in 1897

- Location within California
- Location: 1635 West Beach Dr., Watsonville, California, U.S.
- Coordinates: 36.896389°N 121.775833°W
- Architect: W. H. Weeks
- NRHP reference No.: 04000734
- CHISL No.: N2253

Significant dates
- Added to NRHP: July 28, 2004
- Designated CHISL: July 28, 2004

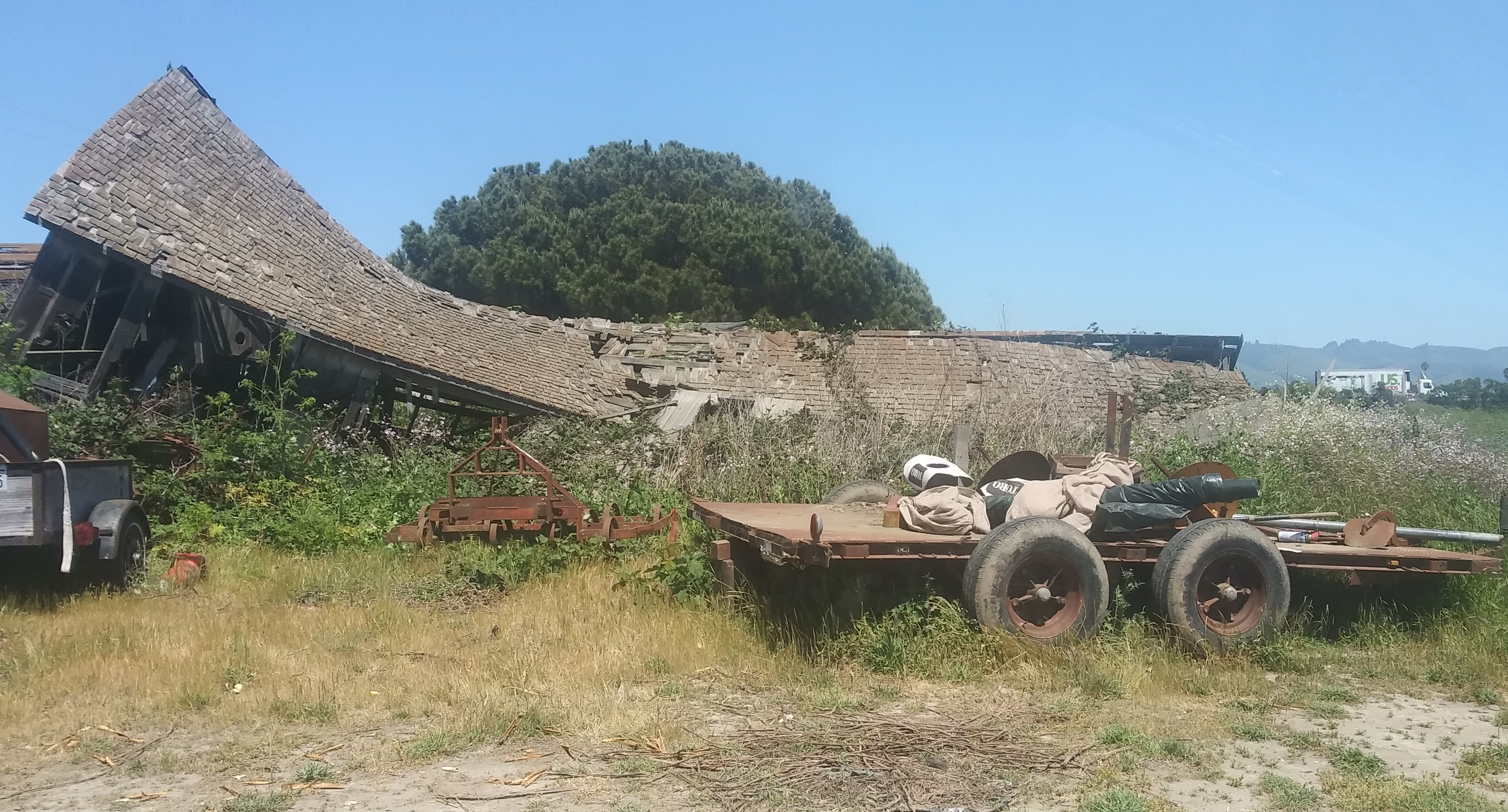
Redman Hirahara Barn (May 2020)

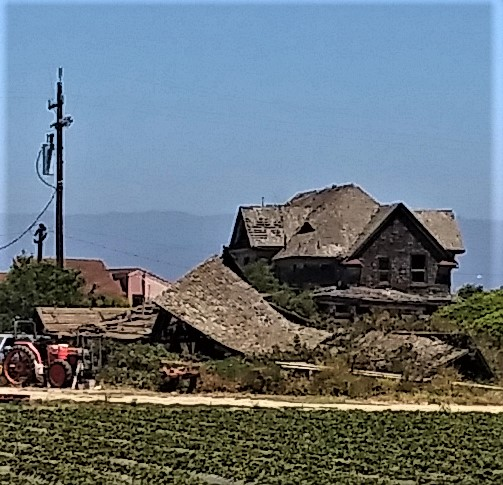
Redman Hirahara Barn in collapse (June 2022)

Redman Hirahara Farmstead is a complex including a historic house designed by William Weeks (1897) and a vernacular barn in the Pajaro Valley, south of Watsonville, California. The farm, which was owned by a Japanese American family, was maintained by local citizens and watched over by family friend, attorney John McCarthy, during the internment of Japanese Americans in World War II. The farm was returned to the Hirahara family after the war. The barn included a living unit prior to the war and was expanded postwar to house other returning Japanese families. It is listed on the National Register of Historic Places under the name Redman House, since 2004; and was listed as a California Historical Landmark from 2004 - August 2025.

== History ==
This Victorian house was designed by architect W. H. Weeks, in 1897 for James Redman, who died in 1921. In 1937, it was sold for $69,575 to J. Katsumi Tao, a naturalized citizen and "brother-in-law" (or sibling-in-law) of Mitoshi Hirahara. Mitoshi was considered an 'alien' and could not purchase property at that time. Mr. Tao sold the property to Mitoshi's son, Fumio Hirahara (age 16) in 1940 for $10.00 as Fumio was also a naturalized citizen.

Pajaro Valley Japanese Americans were removed in 1942 under Executive Order 9066. The Hiraharas had traveled to Fresno, California to visit a relative, thinking they would be safe there, but soon all immigrants and Americans of Japanese descent were instructed to gather in the 'Fresno Assembly Center". The center was hosted at the Fresno Fairgrounds from May to October, 1942. From there the Hiraharas were sent to the Jerome War Relocation Center in Arkansas by train. When the Jerome center closed, they were relocated to the Rohwer War Relocation Center in Arkansas. During this time away from their home in Watsonville, California, as noted above, the Hirahara's were fortunate John McCarthy watched over their property in Watsonville to ensure the property rights were retained. Mr. McCarthy even went to visit the Hiraharas in Arkansas.

Before the entire Hirahara family returned to Watsonville, California, Mitoshi Hirahara and his eldest son Fumio Hirahara traveled ahead to ensure it was “safe” for the rest of the family to return. Upon receiving confirmation from Mitoshi and Fumio, the rest of the Hirahara family returned from the Jerome and Rohwer internment camps in Arkansas on June 4, 1945. Their journey took them by train to Oakland, where they then boarded a ferry across the bay to San Francisco, followed by another train ride south to Watsonville, where they reoccupied their family property. However, for many Japanese-Americans, injustices continued after the war and many were unable to return to their prewar housing. Additions to the carriage barn on the Hirahara property were made in order to provide housing for other Japanese-Americans who did not have homes to which they could return. Following the World War II, Mitoshi Hirahara employed many Japanese-Americans to support the farm until they could get back on their feet. On payday, Japanese workers would line up at the back door of the house, where Mitoshi's eldest daughter handed out wages through a small service window that connected the kitchen to the living area.

In the months following their return, the Hirahara family faced ongoing hostility and discrimination. On more than one occasion, shots were fired at their home by people driving along Lee or Beach Road. Local gas stations refused to sell fuel to the family, forcing Fumio to drive as far as Monterey to buy gasoline for the cars and tractors. Grocery stores in town also denied service, with one exception: a small store across the bridge in Pajaro quietly told the Hiraharas to come to the back entrance at night, where they would discreetly sell them food and supplies, fearful of being reprimanded by local business leaders for serving Japanese customers. Over time, however, tensions in the area began to ease, and the local Japanese-American community gradually regained acceptance within Watsonville.

== House ==
The house was constructed in 1897 and designed by William H. Weeks, who was responsible for the design of hundreds of unique buildings throughout California. It was a classic Queen Anne — it featured a rounded corner tower with a turret, gables with meticulously carved panels, Palladian windows and dentil molding. The intricate detailing that Weeks designed for the exterior of the home could also be found inside — expensive and decorative wood, including eastern oak and bird's eye maple, were used for doors, mantels, and window casings.

Author and Hirahara descendant, Naomi Hirahara, describes a visit in the 1950s, “One favorite spot for all the grandchildren, grand-nephews, and grand-nieces was just on the side of the curved staircase on the first floor”.

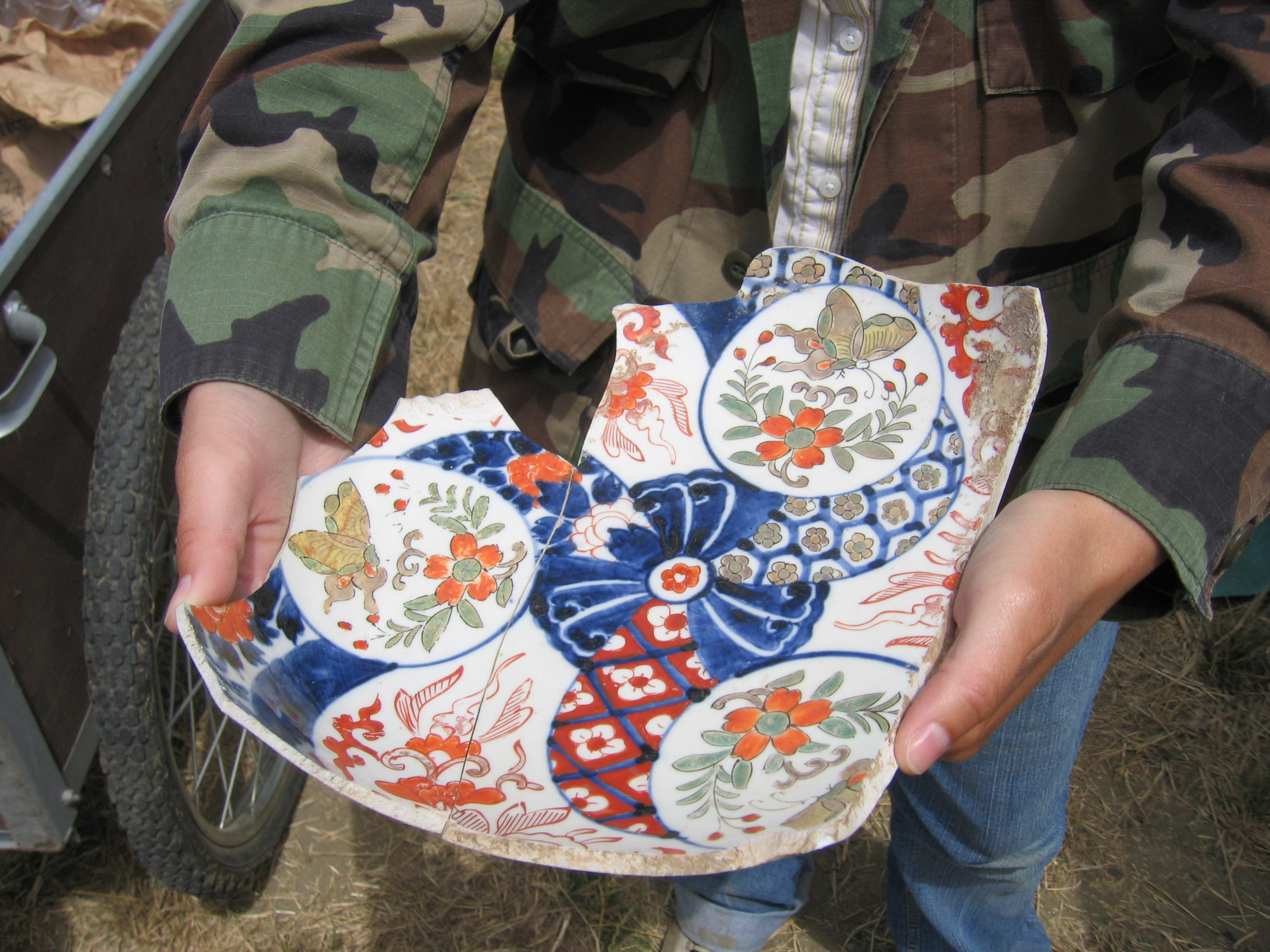
Several pieces of an Imari bowl found during archaeological excavations near the back door of the Redman Hirahara House.

Salvage Archaeology around the House was carried out in Summer of 2005 and reported on by Charr Simpson-Smith and Rob Edwards. The soil stratigraphy showed cultural strata interspersed with silt lenses of episodic flooding. The foundation for the front porch had been repaired, possibly after the 1906 earthquake. The distribution of artifact categories indicated the greatest activity occurred at the back door (32), front door (7), side door (3) and side of house with no door (2).

An extraordinary artifact was found near the back door, an "Imari industry" decorated bowl dated to the 1800s. It would classify as a “heritage” item as the Hirahara family first occupied the Farmstead in the 1930s.

== Carriage barn ==
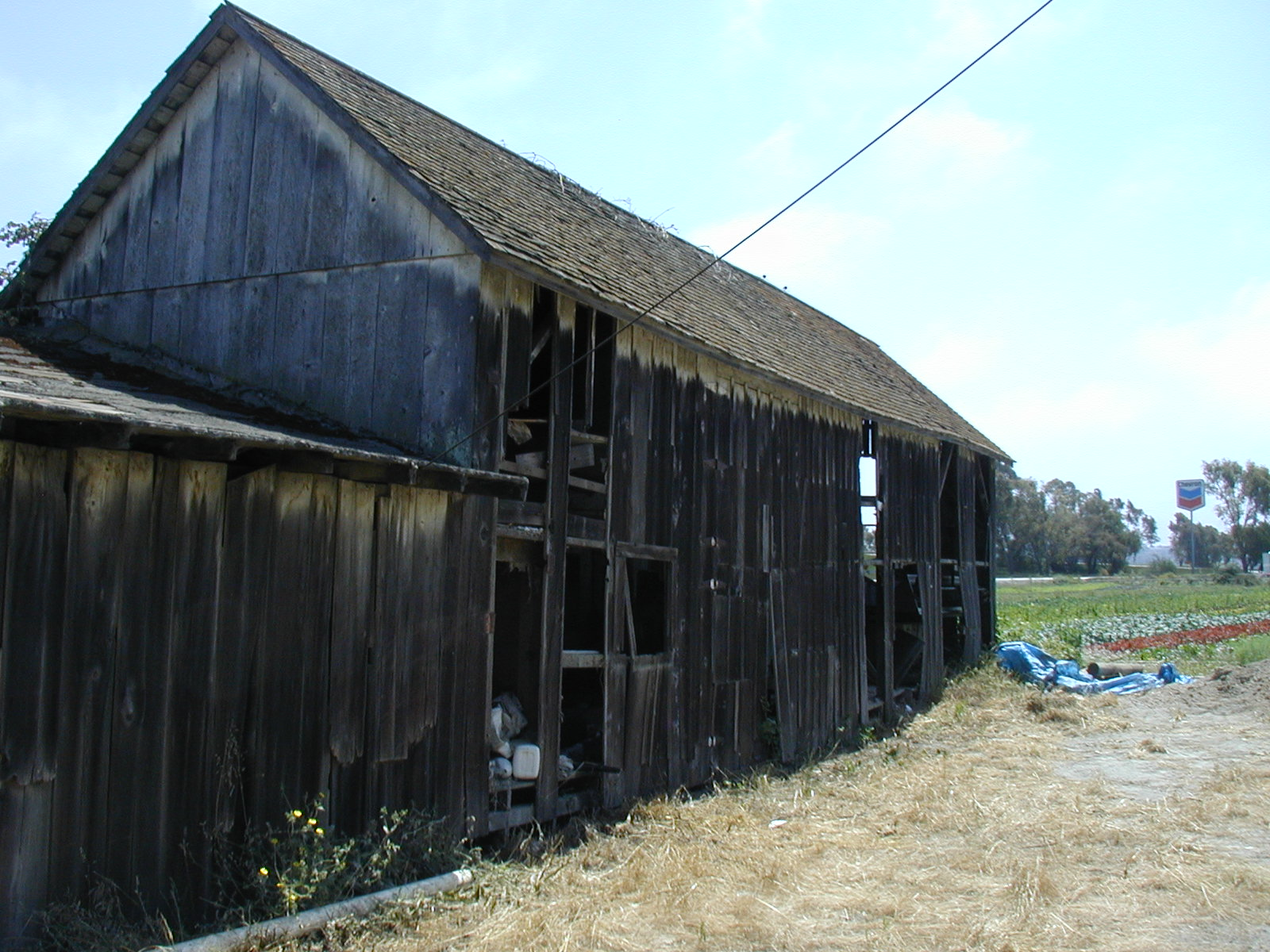
Redman Hirahara Carriage Barn in 2005.

The barn was estimated to have been built around 1900, about the same time as the Victorian. The barn was 1 and ½ story with an attached lean to element. One small living unit was built prewar. In this room between the layer of a 1937 newspaper and two upper layers of wallpaper, portions of the Japanese book The Autobiography of Osugi Sakae was nailed to the wall. Osugi Sakae (1885–1923) was a rebel, anarchist and martyr.

The carriage barn was expanded postwar to house other returning Japanese families. Various wall treatments and linoleum support the existence of four apartments.

== In popular culture ==
In 2013, the writer Naomi Hirahara, describes the badly damaged house as the "Stem House" in the mystery novel Strawberry Yellow.

== See also ==
- National Register of Historic Places listings in Santa Cruz County, California
