= Golden Gate Villa =

Historic house in California, United States

- U.S. National Register of Historic Places
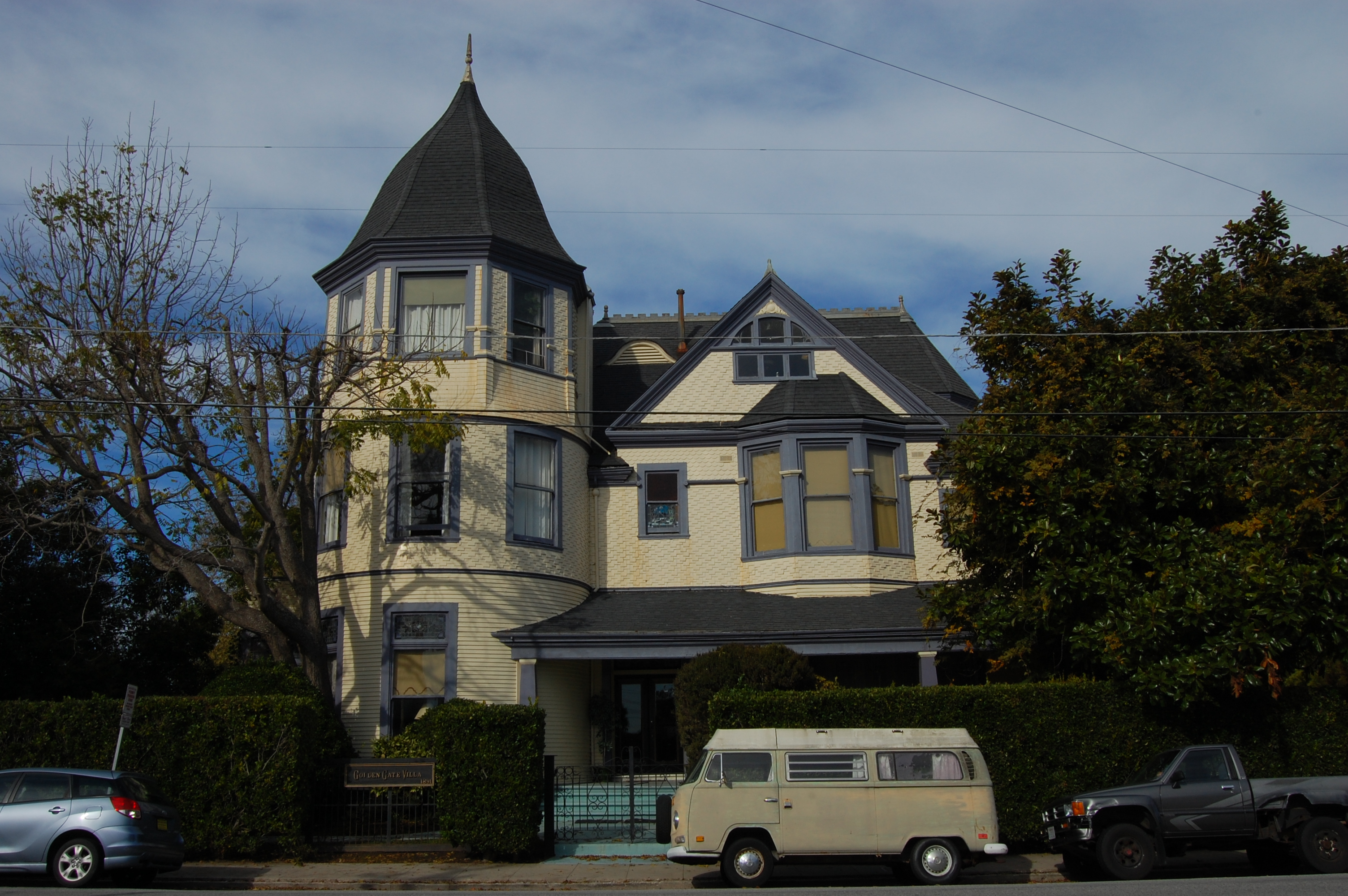
- Golden Gate Villa as it appeared in 2010

- Location within California Location within the United States
- Location: 924 3rd St., Santa Cruz, California
- Coordinates: 36°58′2″N 122°1′18″W
- Built: 1891
- Architect: Welsh, Thomas J.
- Architectural style: Queen Anne
- NRHP reference No.: 75000482
- Added to NRHP: July 24, 1975

The Golden Gate Villa is a Queen Anne style house built in 1891 in Santa Cruz, California. The house was designed by San Francisco architect Thomas J. Welsh for Major Frank McLaughlin, a mining engineer and California politician. Visitors to Golden Gate Villa included Theodore Roosevelt and Thomas Edison. In the 1940s the house was operated as a restaurant, the Palais Monte Carlo. After passing through several owners, in 1963 the house was purchased by seafood magnate William W. Durney and his screenwriter wife Dorothy Kingsley, who sold it to the present owner. On July 24, 1975, the Golden Gate Villa was added to the United States National Register of Historic Places.
