= Mystery Spot =

Tourist attraction in Santa Cruz, California

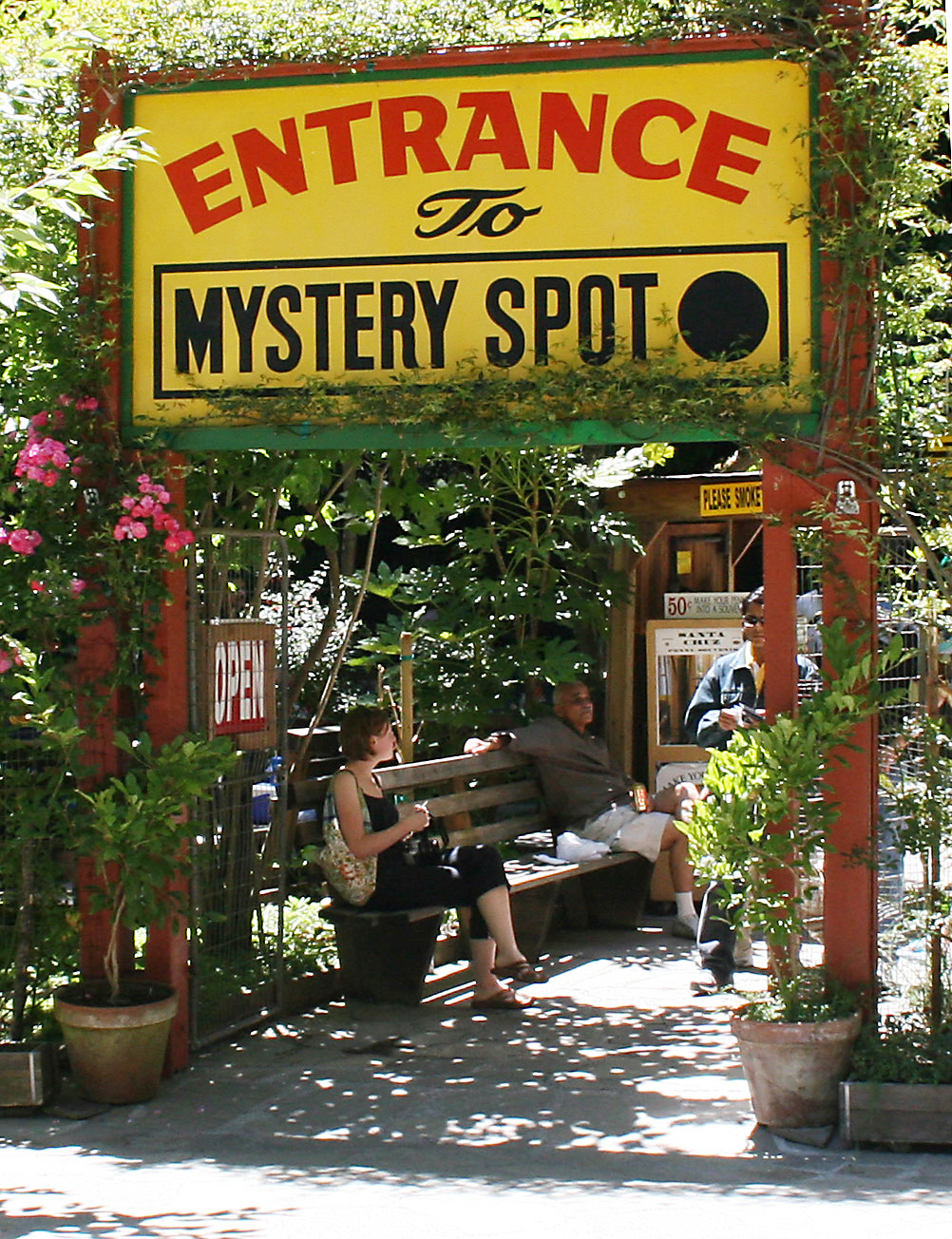

- Location within California
- 37.012601°N 122.001795°W
- Location: 465 Mystery Spot Rd, Santa Cruz, California

California Historical Landmark
- Reference no.: 1055

The Mystery Spot is a tourist attraction near Santa Cruz, California, opened in 1939 by George Prather. Visitors experience demonstrations that appear to defy gravity, on the short but steep uphill walk and inside a wooden building on the site. It is a popular tourist attraction, and gained recognition as a roadside "gravity box" or "tilted house". The site is what is known as a gravity hill and was the first of its kind to be built in California.

== History ==
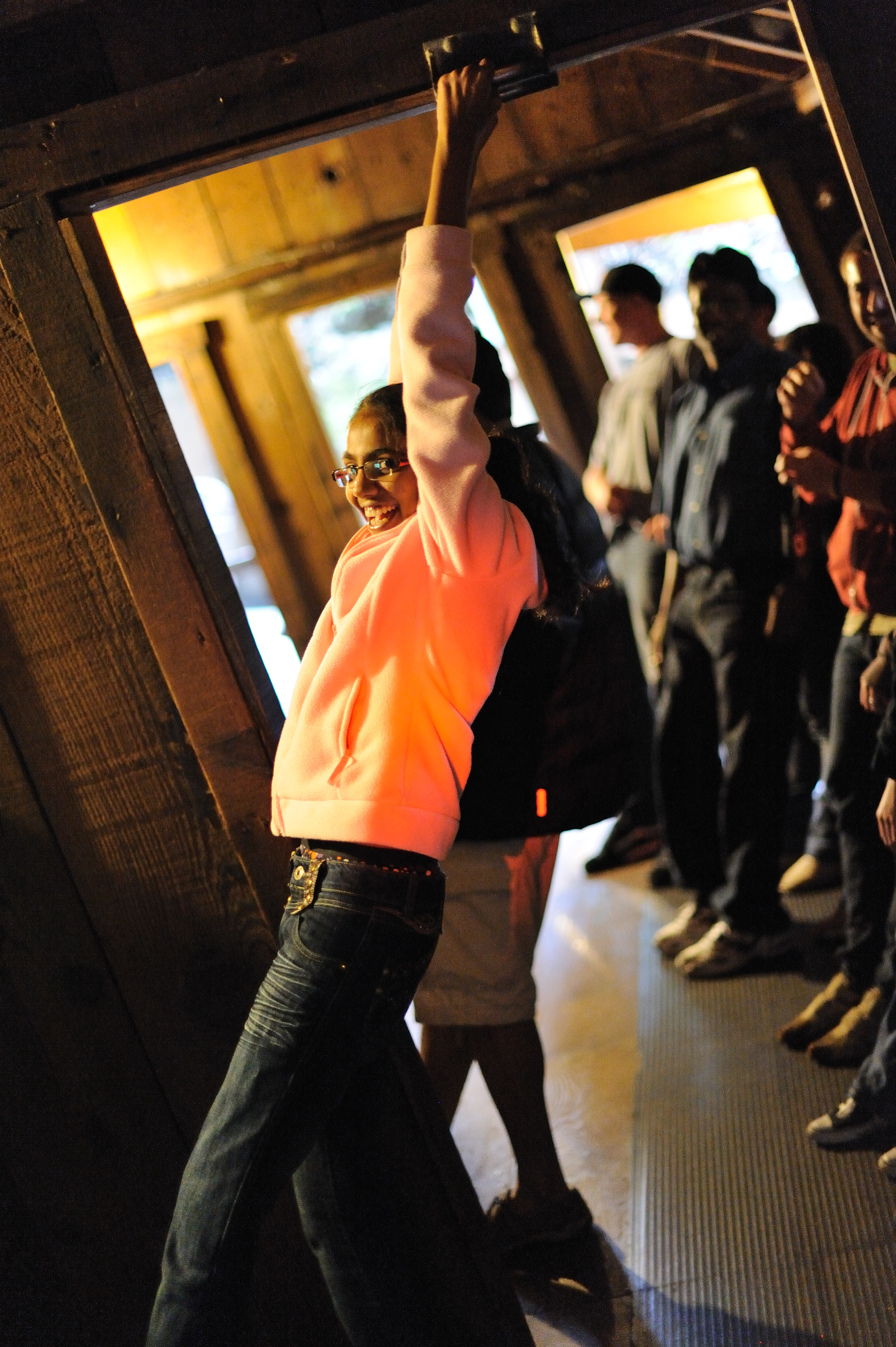
One of the site's many optical illusions

The Mystery Spot was opened by George Prather in 1939. Prather was an electrician, mechanic, and inventor who was born near Fresno and moved to Santa Cruz in 1920. He owned a welding shop and repair garage in the area before he opened the Mystery Spot. One of several roadside attractions that opened after World War II for new automobile owners, the Mystery Spot was featured on Art Baker's television show You Asked for It.

Prather was inspired to open the site by the popularity of the Oregon Vortex, which opened to the public in 1930. According to a newspaper report, Prather bought three acres on the hill in 1940 after he felt slightly dizzy while walking and was interested in his dizziness. The newspaper also reported that during further exploration of his property he found his compass jittering. He built a "crazy house" and opened the site to the public in June 1941. Tour guides lead visitors through the attraction and perform various demonstrations to showcase the site's unusual effects.

Prather died in January 1946; his son Bruce inherited the land and continued running the Mystery Spot with his father's business partner Vaden McCray. The McCray family was photographed for the Life magazine spread on the Mystery Spot for their November 15, 1948, issue. McCray died in 2001; Bruce Prather died in 2015. As of 2004, Christopher Smith owned the property.

In July 2004, the Mystery Spot was nominated to be designated a California Historical Landmark, and received its designation (#1055) in August 2014.

== Geography ==
The site is near Santa Cruz, California in redwood forest land among the Santa Cruz Mountains near Granite Creek. It is home to a man-made dahlia garden along the hiking trail.

== Explanation ==
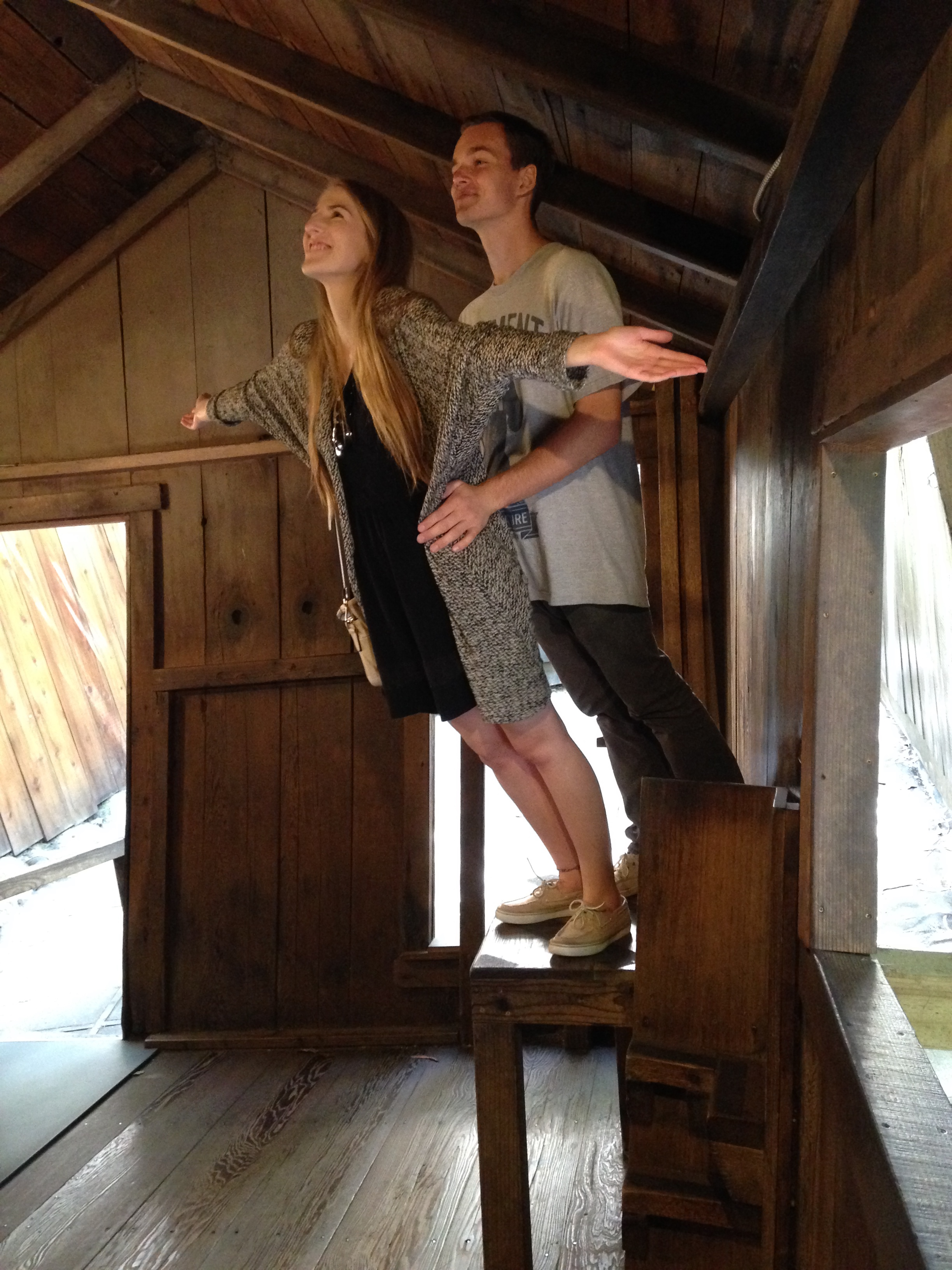
The classic Titanic pose on a table

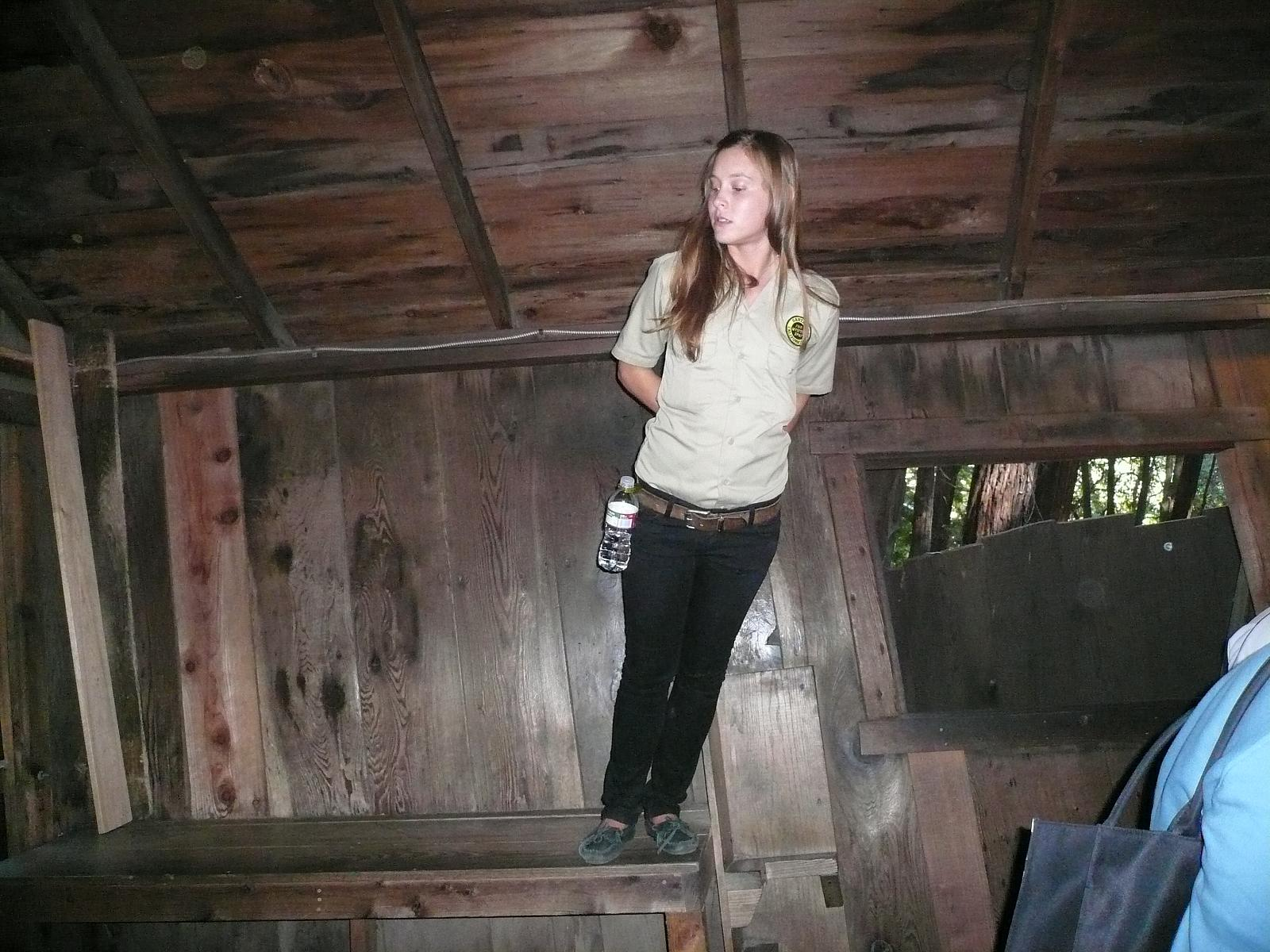
Guide leaning on top of a table

The Mystery Spot is a gravity hill, a visual illusion resulting from the oddly tilted environment as well as standing on a tilted floor. Inside the tilted room, misperceptions of the height and orientation of objects occur. Even when people are standing outside on a level ground, the slant of the building in the background causes misperceptions as humans judge the height of people using the slant of the roof rather than the true horizon.

These visual illusions include balls rolling uphill and people leaning farther than normally possible without falling down. Psychologists at Berkeley state that all of the misperceptions stem from the simple fact that the house is slanted at a 20° angle. Professor William Prinzmetal states, "When the perceiver's body also is tilted, the distorting impact on vision is greatly magnified—up to two or three times." Another point he makes is that distorted orientation causes other senses to fall back while one's visual senses become heightened. People standing at impossible angles and water flowing uphill are related to the angle at which the house sits.

Other suggestions have been proposed to explain the reason behind The Mystery Spot's odd gravitational rules and illusions. Tour guides suggest that "a meteor which fell in ancient days and left a magic circle" is the cause behind the mystery, and suggest that an electromagnetic field on the hill deters wildlife. These suggested explanations are proposed for entertainment, not scientific reasoning.

== Cultural relevance ==
The Mystery Spot was the first "gravity-defying" tourist attraction in California and was the most prominent illusion-based tourist attraction in California in the mid-20th century. It has been featured on BuzzFeed, and in the Santa Cruz Sentinel and other newspapers, comic strips, and travel blogs for decades.

== See also ==
- Confusion Hill, a similar roadside attraction in Piercy, California
- Oregon Vortex, a similar roadside attraction in Gold Hill, Oregon
- The Wonder Spot, a similar attraction in Wisconsin
- List of gravity hills
