= Hinds House =

Historic house in California, United States

- A. J. Hinds House
- U.S. National Register of Historic Places
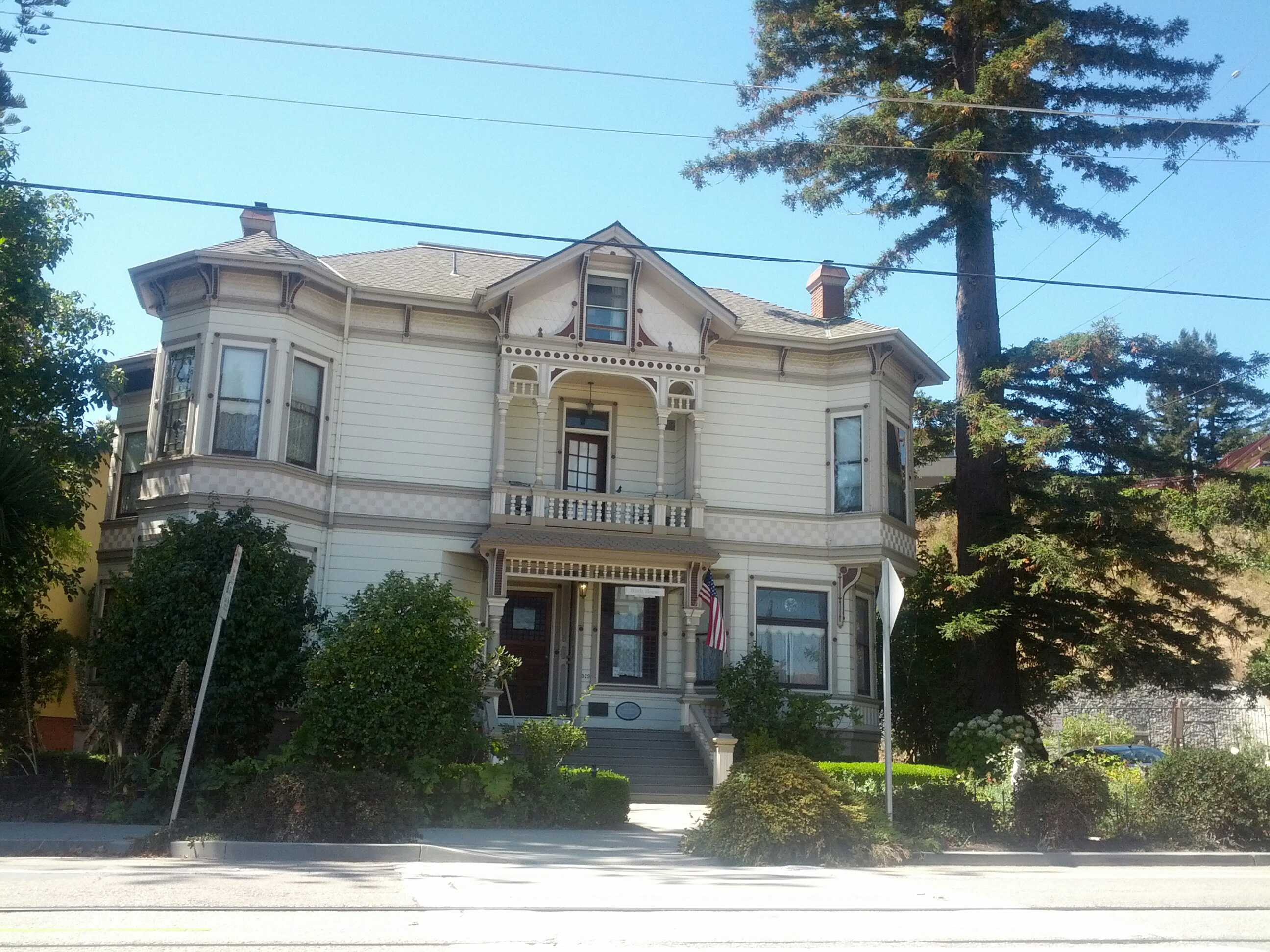

- Location within California
- Location: 529 Chestnut Street, Santa Cruz, California, U.S.
- Coordinates: 36°58′25.02″N 122°1′52.03″W
- Built: 1888
- Architect: John H. Williams
- Architectural style: Stick-Eastlake—Victorian
- NRHP reference No.: 83001241
- Added to NRHP: August 25, 1983

The A. J. Hinds House, also known simply as the Hinds House, is a historic building in Santa Cruz, California. It was built in 1888–1889 for Alfred Joseph Hinds and his wife Sarah, in a Victorian style it is the largest surviving Stick-Eastlake house in Santa Cruz County. It is listed on the National Register of Historic Places since August 25, 1983, under the name "A. J. Hinds House". Today the Hinds House is a historical inn with rooms rented out to guests visiting.

== Hinds family ==
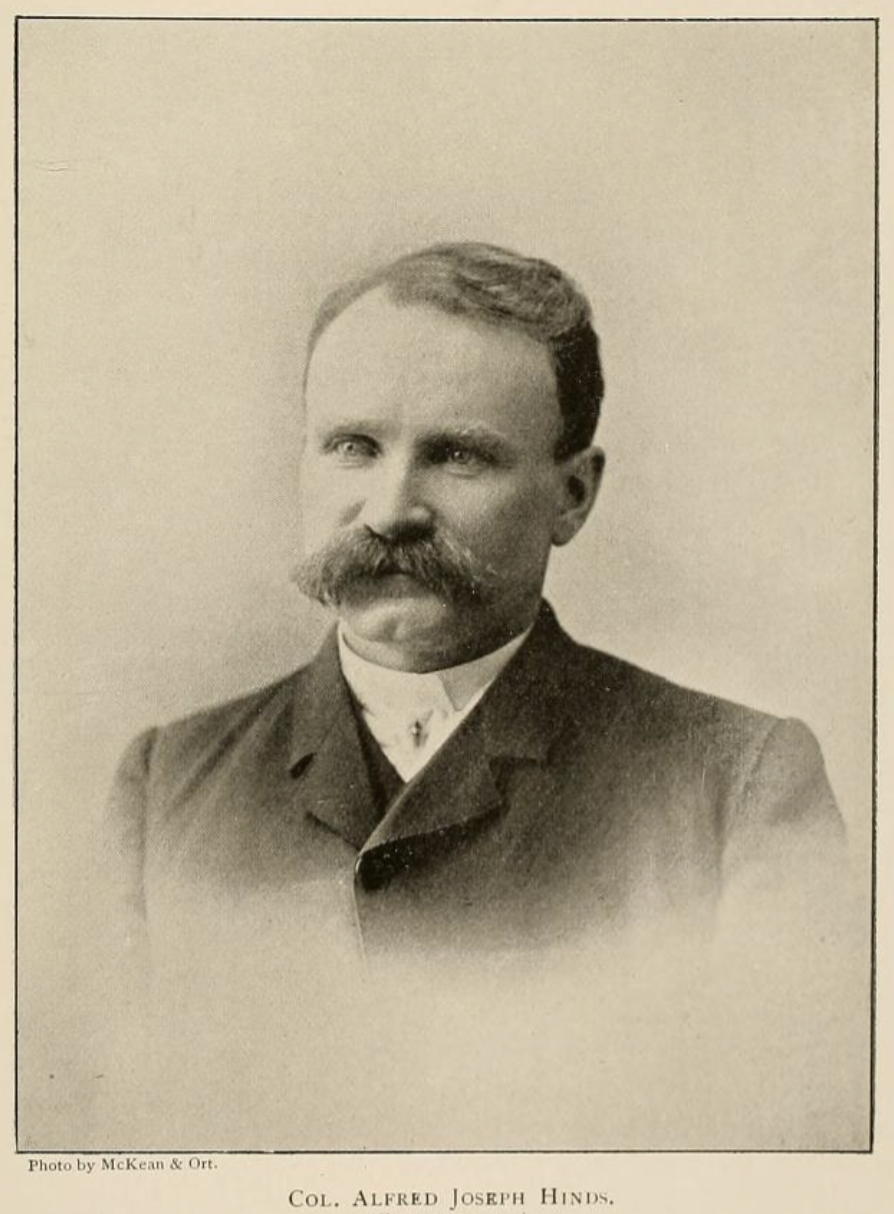
Col. Alfred Joseph Hinds

Colonel Alfred Joseph Hinds was born in 1845 in Chester, England. In 1848 his family moved to France and then the United States, eventually living in Iowa. During the California Gold Rush in 1850 they moved to San Francisco, although his mother died on the trip. In 1852 they moved to Santa Cruz, where he started school. In 1866 he opened a book and stationery shop in downtown Santa Cruz. On June 8, 1869, he married Sarah Lee Howe from San Mateo, California.

His sister Amelia Hinds married Duncan McPherson, publisher of the local newspaper Santa Cruz Sentinel.

In 1875 Hind started to develop real estate in the city of Santa Cruz. He would buy up large tracts of land on the edges of town and subdivide and sell them. He was the secretary and trustee of the First Congregational Church since 1875 and one of the first trustees of the Santa Cruz Public Library. He was active in the California Republican Party and helped organize the Avalon Lodge number 89 of the Knights of Pythias. In 1888 he was appointed "Colonel" in the Knights, and he became known by that title. He was also active in other fraternal orders.

Alfred Hinds and his wife Sarah had four children who were all lost when a diphtheria epidemic swept Santa Cruz in 1876. They started a new family and at least three children survived. Sons included Leland Foye Hind, Wendell McPherson Hind, and Theron Winfred Hind.

Hinds died on October 8, 1921, at age 76, at his home in Santa Cruz.

== Construction of the Hinds House ==
Hinds hired Santa Cruz architect John H. Williams to design the house, which was constructed in 1888 and 1889. Williams designed over sixty local buildings between 1876 and 1892. Williams was known for his Stick-Eastlake style, a popular style of Victorian architecture. In the 1890s, one of the first electric lights in Santa Cruz was installed in the house. Electricity came from Fred Swanton's new power plant fifteen miles up the coast from Santa Cruz in Davenport, California. The fixture was put in at the base of the grand stairway, where it remains in use today.

== Hinds House, after the Hinds ==
After Alfred's death, his children and grandchildren eventually moved away and nobody lived in the home. In 1930 the house was bought by two female school teachers. They operated the house and rented out rooms to guests until 1960. Between 1960 and 1980 the house continued to function as an inn under the ownership of two more people. The interiors of the house were also fixed up in this time, including the renovation of the sitting room and parlor on the first floor as apartments. In 1981, Sandra and Stan Mock bought the house and restored it to its original Stick-Eastlake style, restored the original common rooms, making it an example of the Victorian influence in Santa Cruz. In 2004 Brion Sprinsock and Kristine Albrecht purchased the property and operate the Hinds Victorian Guest House offering weekly lodging in downtown Santa Cruz.

== Recognition ==
In 1982, the Santa Cruz Historical Society designated the Hinds House a historic landmark. On August 25, 1983, the house was put on the National Register of Historic Places listings in Santa Cruz County, California by the United States Department of the Interior.

== Today ==
The Hinds House has been a historic bed and breakfast inn since 1982 and today it is the best example of William's Stick-Eastlake style buildings in Santa Cruz County. The current innkeeper of the Hinds House is Brion Sprinsock, and the house has ten rooms for guests, including the attic. The ground floor has common rooms, including the dining room, the sitting room, and the parlor. The original woodwork throughout the house is intact and polished. Outside, to either side of the house, there is a large Norfolk pine and a 125-foot-tall (38 m) Coastal Redwood. Rooms are rented by the week. The largest percentages of guests (33%) are visiting the University of California, Santa Cruz. The Hinds House is near the center of downtown Santa Cruz at 529 Chestnut Street.
