= Valencia Hall =

- U.S. National Register of Historic Places
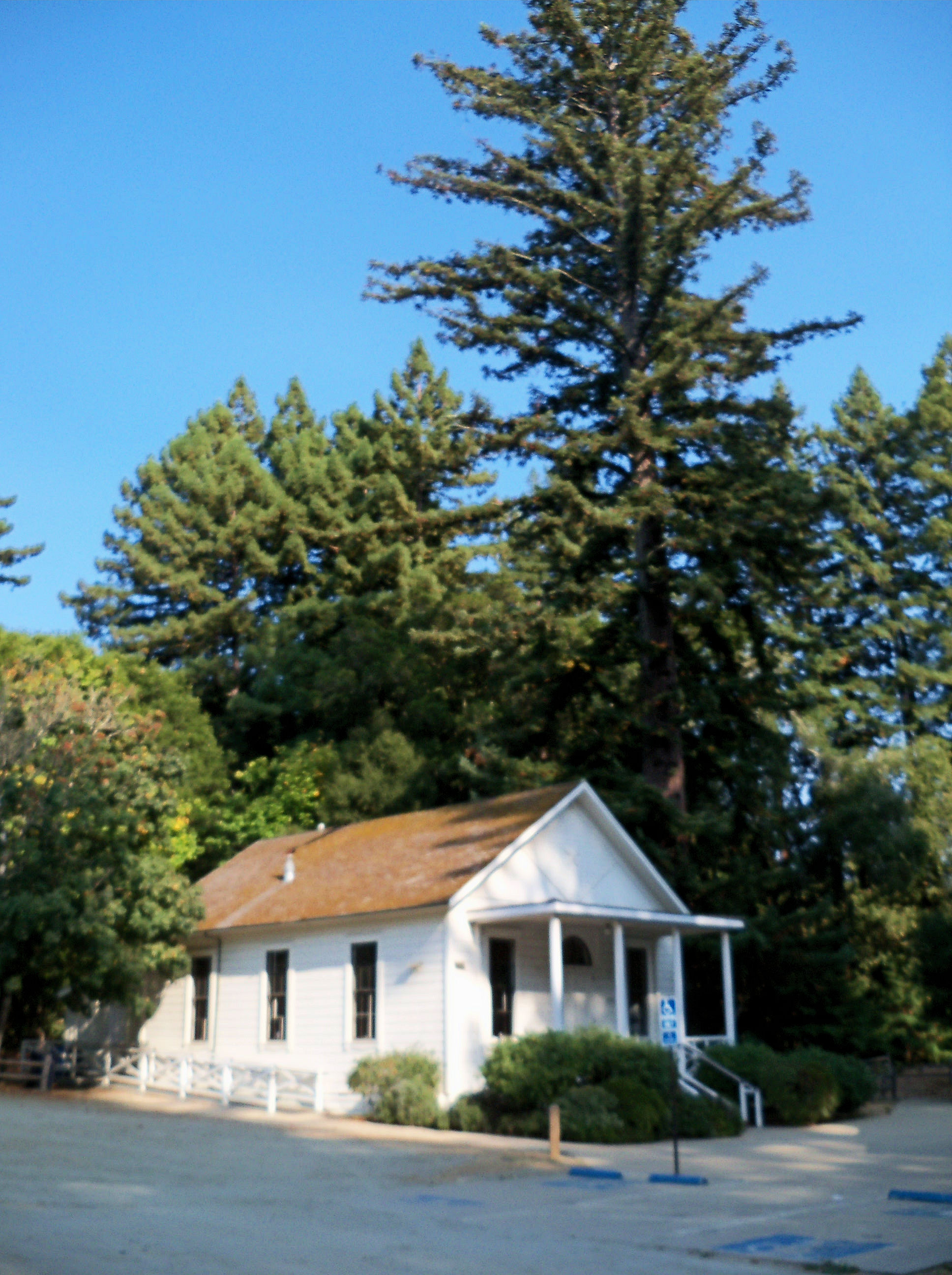

- Location within California
- Nearest city: Aptos, California
- Coordinates: 36°59′47″N 121°51′55″W
- Area: 0.6 acres (0.24 ha)
- Built: c.1884
- Built by: F.A. Hihn
- Architectural style: Late Victorian
- NRHP reference No.: 84001201
- Added to NRHP: September 20, 1984

Valencia Hall, in Santa Cruz County, California near Aptos, California, was built around 1884 by F.A. Hihn. It was listed on the National Register of Historic Places in 1984.

It is a 30 by 40 feet (9.1 m × 12.2 m) structure built entirely of redwood. It was built on Valencia Creek as a meeting place and community center for a community planned to serve millhands and their families.
