= Judge Lee House =

Historic house in California, United States

- U.S. National Register of Historic Places
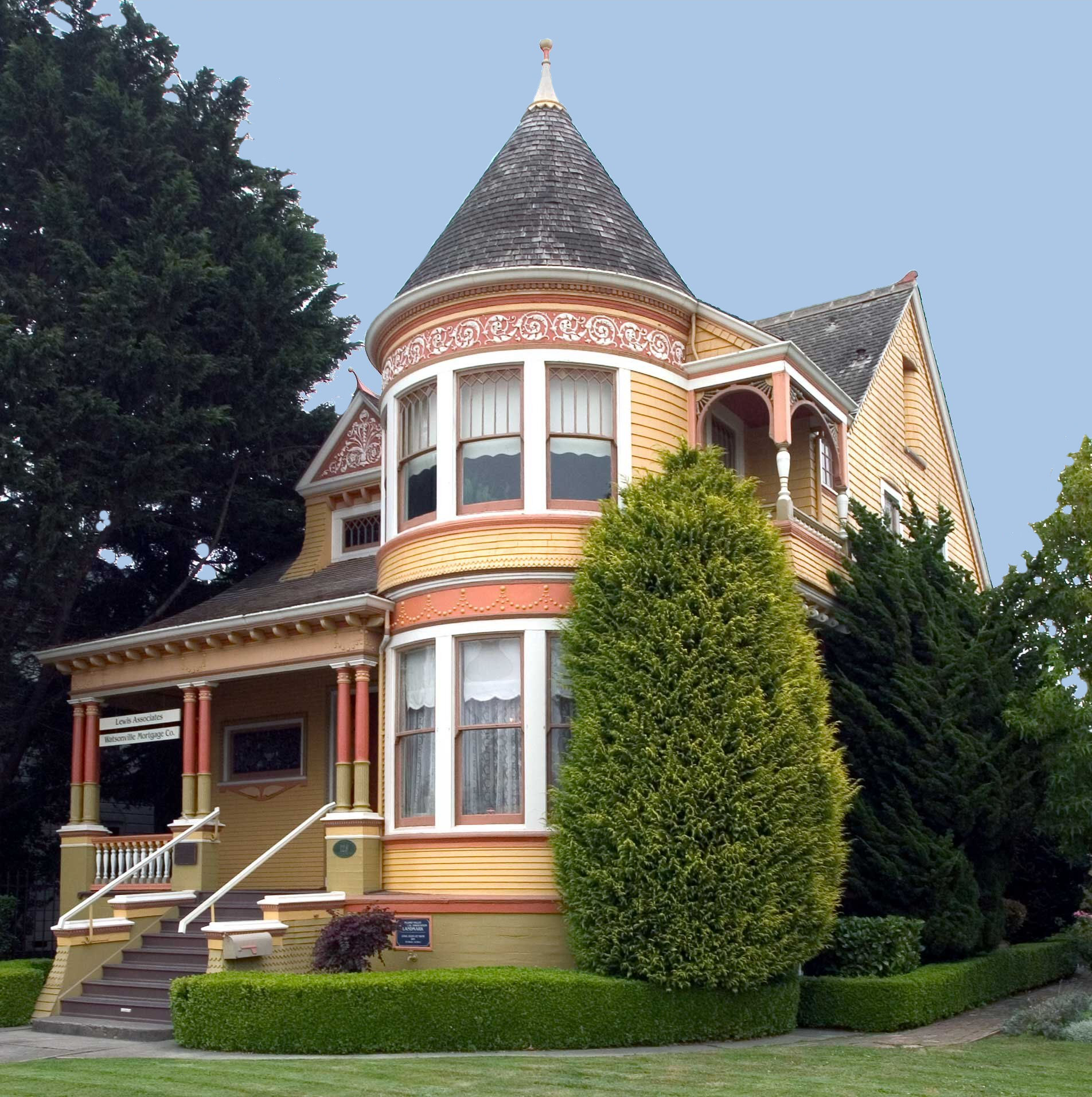

- Location within California
- Location: 128 E. Beach St., Watsonville, California
- Coordinates: 36°54′42″N 121°45′13″W
- Area: less than one acre
- Built: 1894
- Built by: Jennings, J.S.
- Architect: Weeks, W.H.
- Architectural style: Queen Anne
- NRHP reference No.: 80000868
- Added to NRHP: June 30, 1980

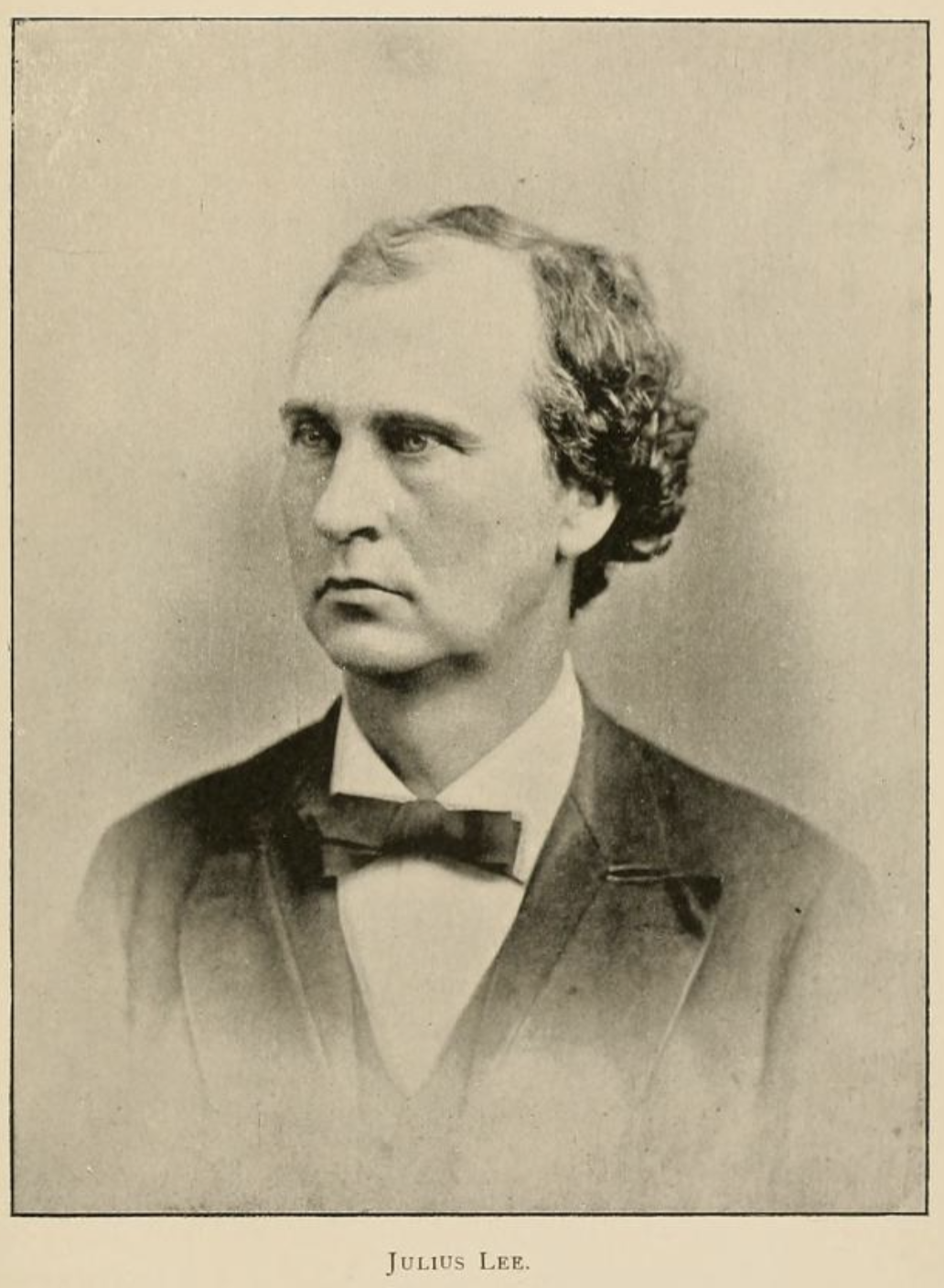
Julius Lee in the 1890s

The Judge Lee House, also known as the Julius Lee House, is a Queen Anne style house built in 1894 in Watsonville, California. It was listed on the National Register of Historic Places on June 30, 1980.

It was designed by architect W. H. Weeks, for district attorney Julius Lee, his wife Marcelia Elmore Lee and their child.
