= Rispin Mansion =

Historic mansion in Capitola, California

- U.S. National Register of Historic Places
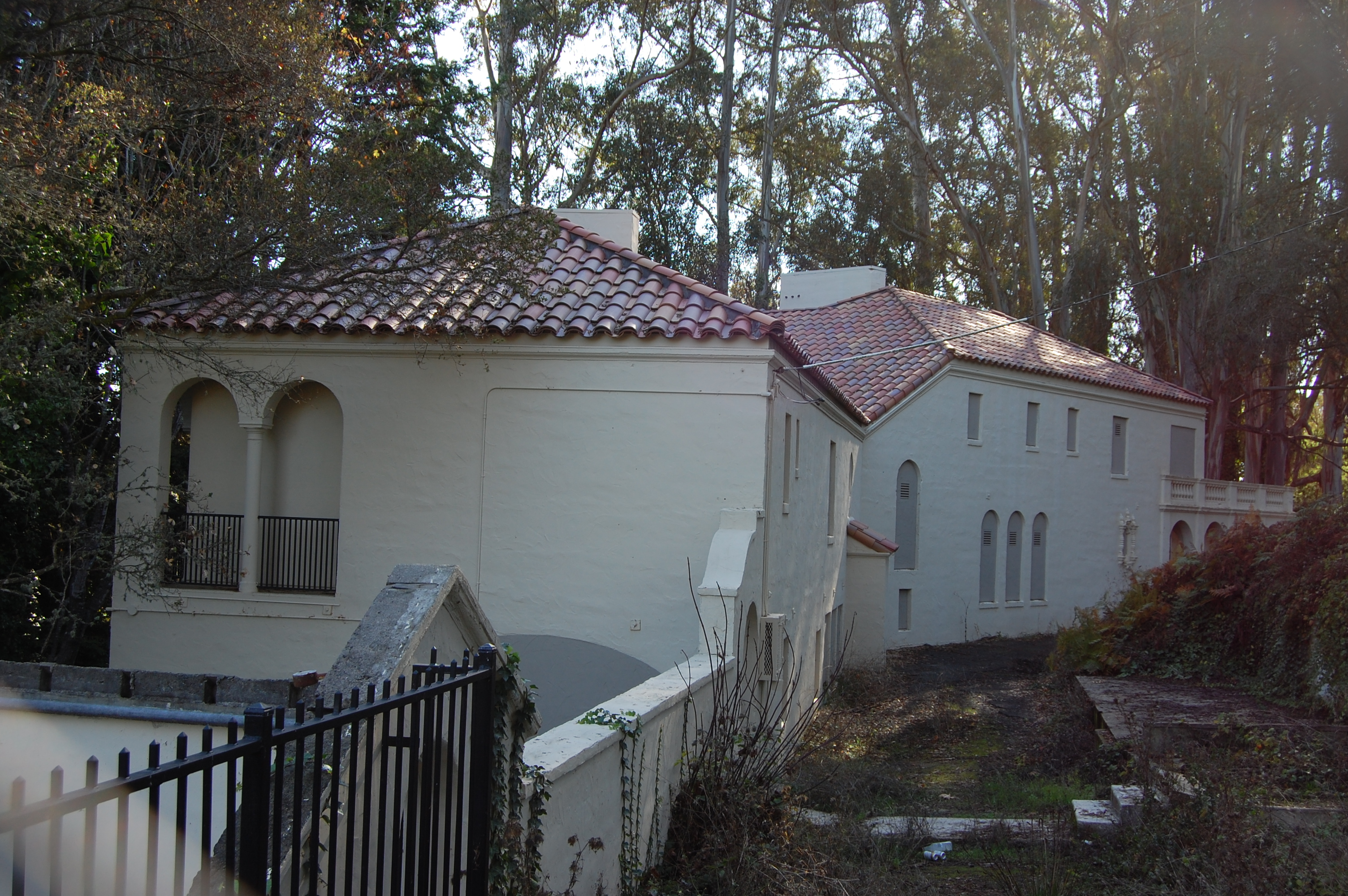

- Location within California
- Location: 2200 Wharf Rd., Capitola, California
- Coordinates: 36°58′43″N 121°57′26″W
- Area: 6.5 acres (2.6 ha)
- Architectural style: Mission/Spanish Revival
- NRHP reference No.: 91000286
- Added to NRHP: March 14, 1991

The Rispin Mansion is a historic mansion, on the National Register of Historic Places, located in Capitola, California. The building was constructed in 1921 by San Franciscan Henry Allen Rispin. It was built with four stories, 22 rooms, and over 7,100 square feet (660 m^{2}) at a time when today's City of Capitola was still the unincorporated "Camp Capitola". Described as being "cursed," Rispin Mansion was first used as a real-estate showroom, and then, at various times, as a residence, a nunnery, a SWAT practice ground, and a ghost hunting site.

== History ==
Henry Allen Rispin is considered one of the founding fathers of Capitola. At one point, he owned or controlled most of the land in the new city, seeing its large potential as a vacation spot and tourist attraction. He did not construct the mansion to reside in, but rather to use as a real estate showroom and invite potential investors into the newly created community. He lost his fortune during the Great Depression and was forced to sell the mansion ten years after its establishment. The property was sent to foreclosure and sold to his business partner Robert Hays Smith. It was later sold to the Oblates of St. Joseph, who used it as a convent until 1959. It remained abandoned for many decades, incurring much vandalism and graffiti, as well as becoming the focus of many local ghost stories.

The city purchased the property in 1985 for $1.35 million. During this time it was used as a practice area for a local police SWAT team. In 1991 it was nominated and successfully placed on the National Register of Historic Places due to its historical significance with the original owner's relationship to the community and the building's architectural significance.

Beginning in the mid-1990s, developers viewed the property as having potential as a hotel. However, they were met with opposition by local conservation groups that cited the property being adjacent to a creek that houses monarch butterflies, which are at risk of being endangered, as well as potential traffic problems. The matters were finalized in a 2004 legal settlement between the groups, stipulating that the property's space cannot be changed outside of the original facilities and the conservation group would be consulted if any changes were to take place during the construction.

In May 2009, the Capitola City Council approved a 55-year lease that would repair the grounds and turn it into a 25-room boutique hotel. The project was billed at $14 million. However, before construction started, a fire broke out and destroyed around 75% of the mansion, including the tile ceiling, wood floors, and wooden supports. Initially, the developers intended to continue their projected renovations, but then decided against it. A little over a year after the fire, the city debated whether it should demolish the building. Several proposed plans were given, with varying levels of how much, if any, of the building would remain intact after the demolition. In 2012, the City of Capitola invested nearly $649,000 to make repairs, citing that it was cheaper to remodel rather than demolish. The mayor shared that all of the money was from state funds via Capitola's redevelopment agency and the city had plans to turn the grounds into a city park. A few months later, however, the city again reconsidered these plans after state redevelopment funds ran dry and the loan amount remained at the original $1.35 million due to its interest-only loan plan. A unanimous decision was made to hold on to the property despite one council member's opinion that the property seems to be "cursed".

In 2024, Capitola began construction to convert the Rispin grounds into what will be named "The Park at Rispin Mansion". The 2012 repairs "entombed" the mansion, closing all access from the outside, and no further renovation is planned.

== Supernatural interest ==
The Santa Cruz Ghost Hunters, received permission from the city to make a visit to the property during the middle of the night in order to film with a recording crew. The mansion is reportedly a "subject of fascination" for locals as well as "paranormal sleuths".
