= Hihn Building =

- U.S. National Register of Historic Places
- California Historical Landmark
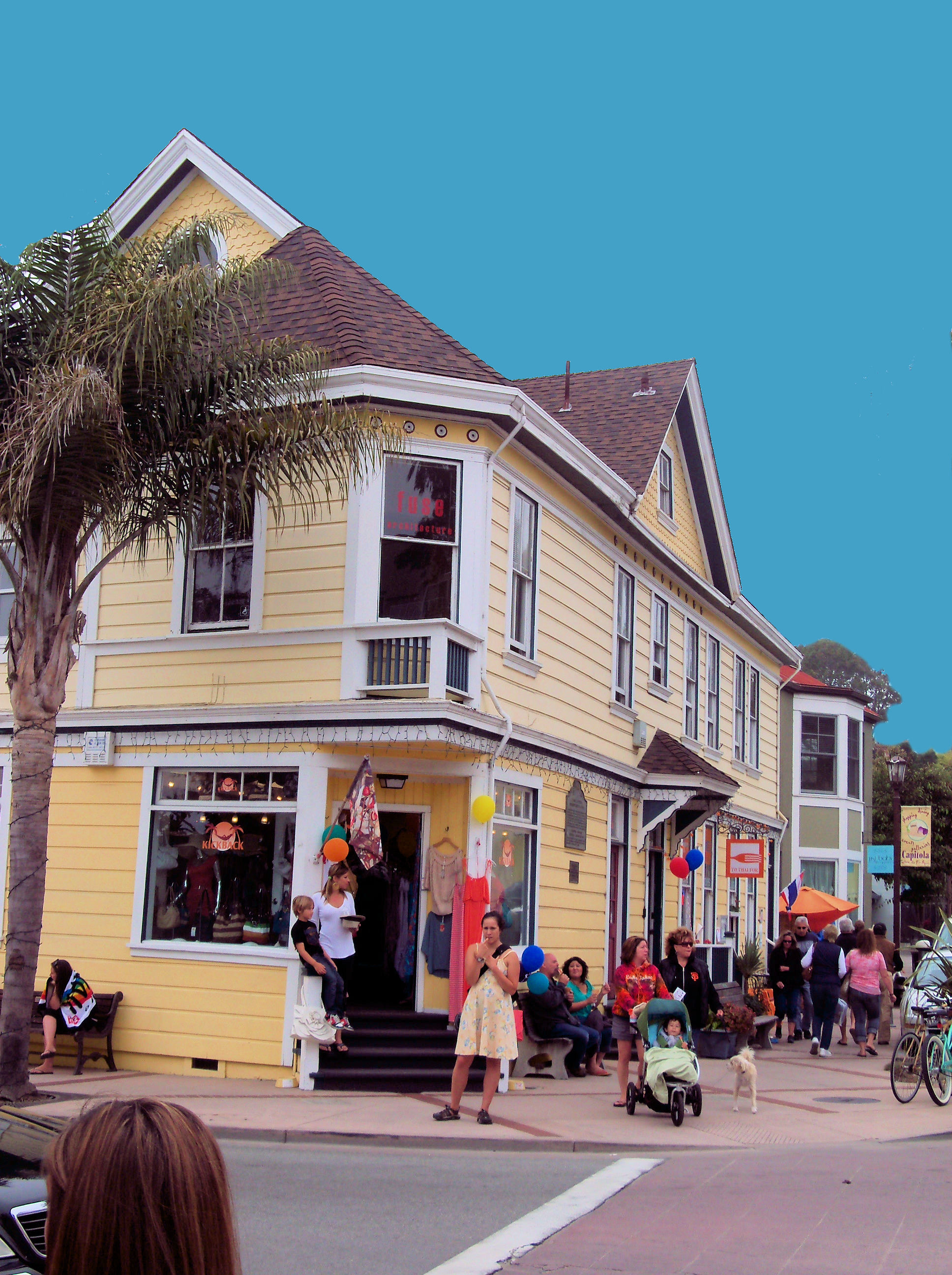
- Location: 201 Monterey Ave., Capitola, California
- Coordinates: 36°58′23″N 121°56′58″W
- Area: 2.1 acres (0.85 ha)
- Built: c. 1883
- Architectural style: Classical
- NRHP reference No.: 73000450
- CHISL No.: 860

Significant dates
- Added to NRHP: March 20, 1973
- Designated CHISL: March 20, 1973

The Hihn Building, also known as the Superintendent's Office, is a historic building at 201 Monterey Avenue in Capitola, California.

It was listed on the National Register of Historic Places in March 20, 1973; and is a California Historical Landmark (No. 860) listed on March 20, 1973. A historical marker was erected in 1973 by State Department of Parks and Recreation, and the Capitola Historical Society.

== History ==
The Hihn Building was built as part of an effort by Frederick A. Hihn to develop a camping resort named Camp Capitola. Hihn was an early Capitola developer, who acquired numerous tracts of land. The grand opening of the 15 acre seaside resort was on July 4, 1874. The seaside resort was at the present site of Village neighborhood and Depot Hill neighborhood of Capitola.

The Hihn Building is Capitola's oldest commercial structure and is believed to have been built in 1883. It was made local redwood in a vaguely Classical style, and was used as the seaside resort's headquarter until 1920s. It was deemed significant as "an excellent example of the style of architecture which was used by the Portuguese when they settled small farming and fishing villages and towns along the California coastline in the latter part of the 19th century."
