= Capitola, California =

City in California, United States

- City
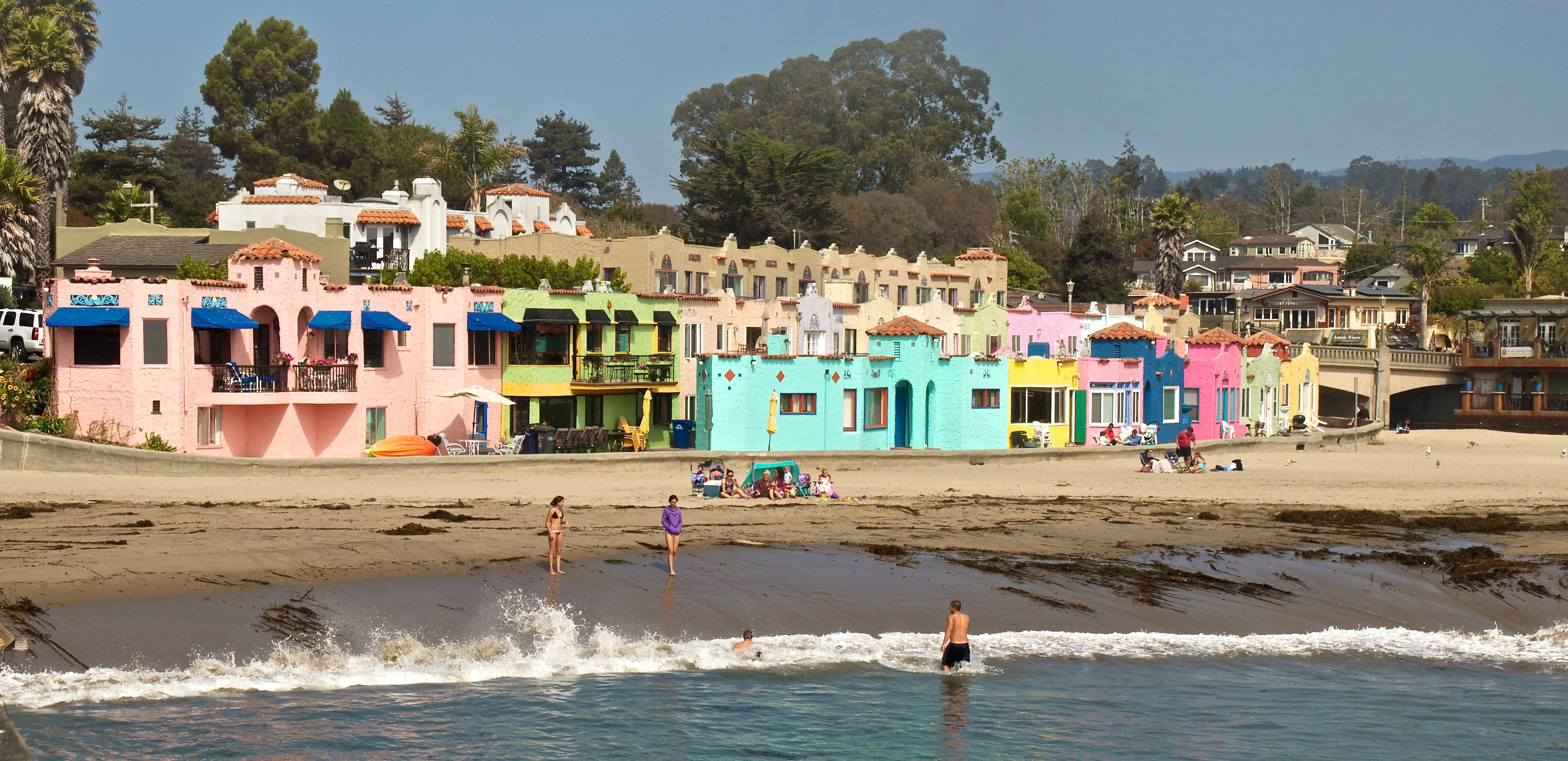
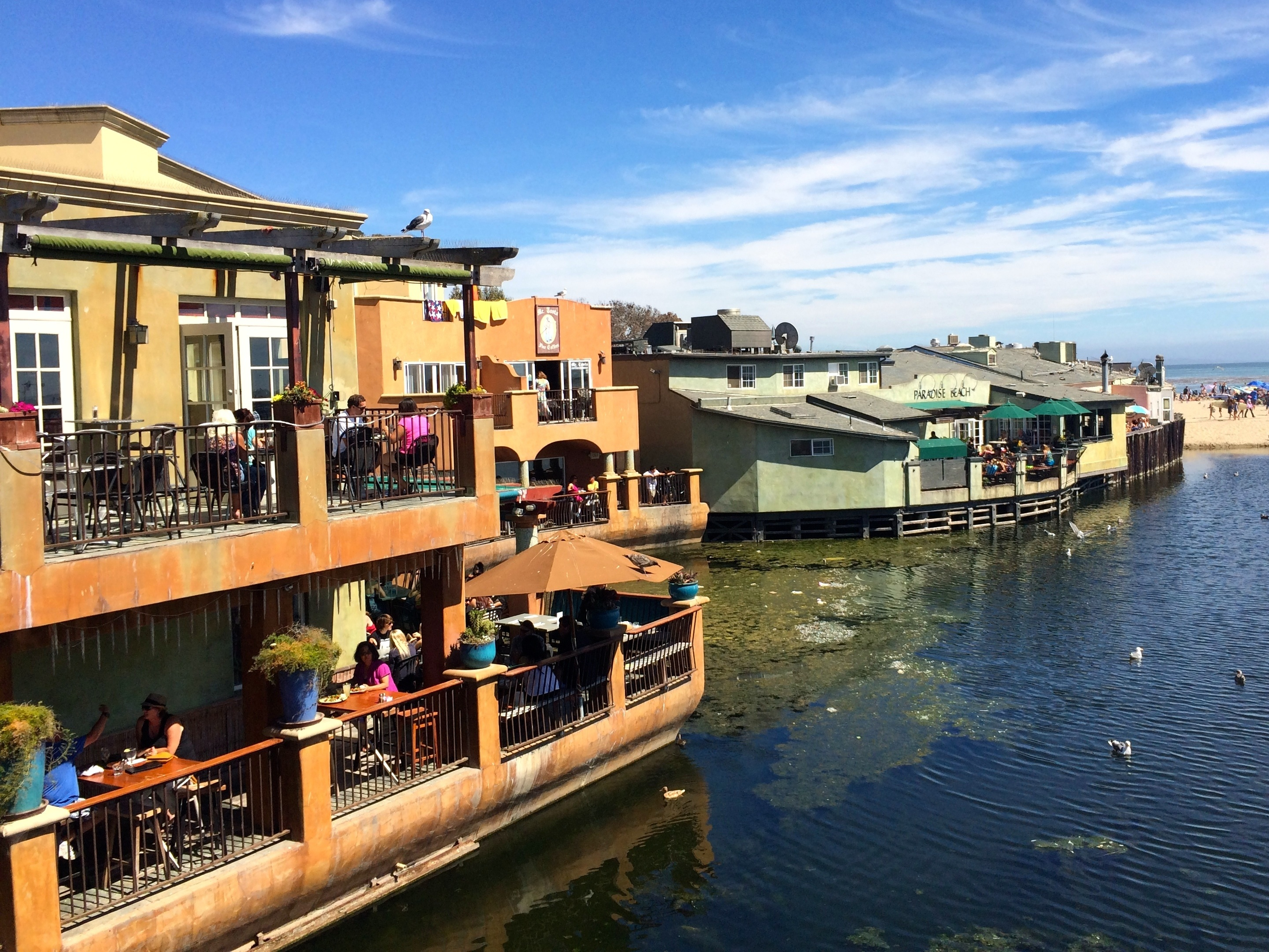
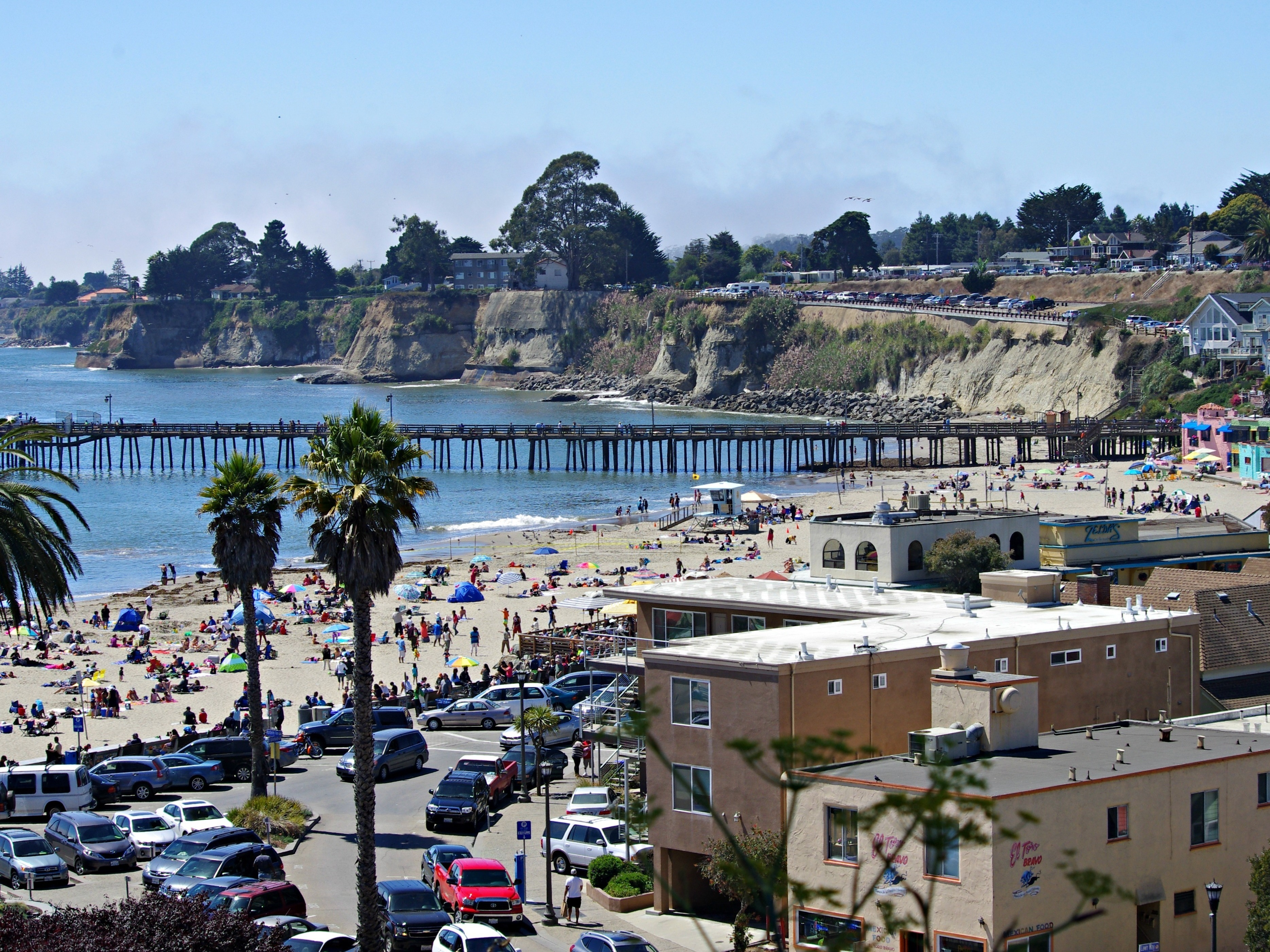
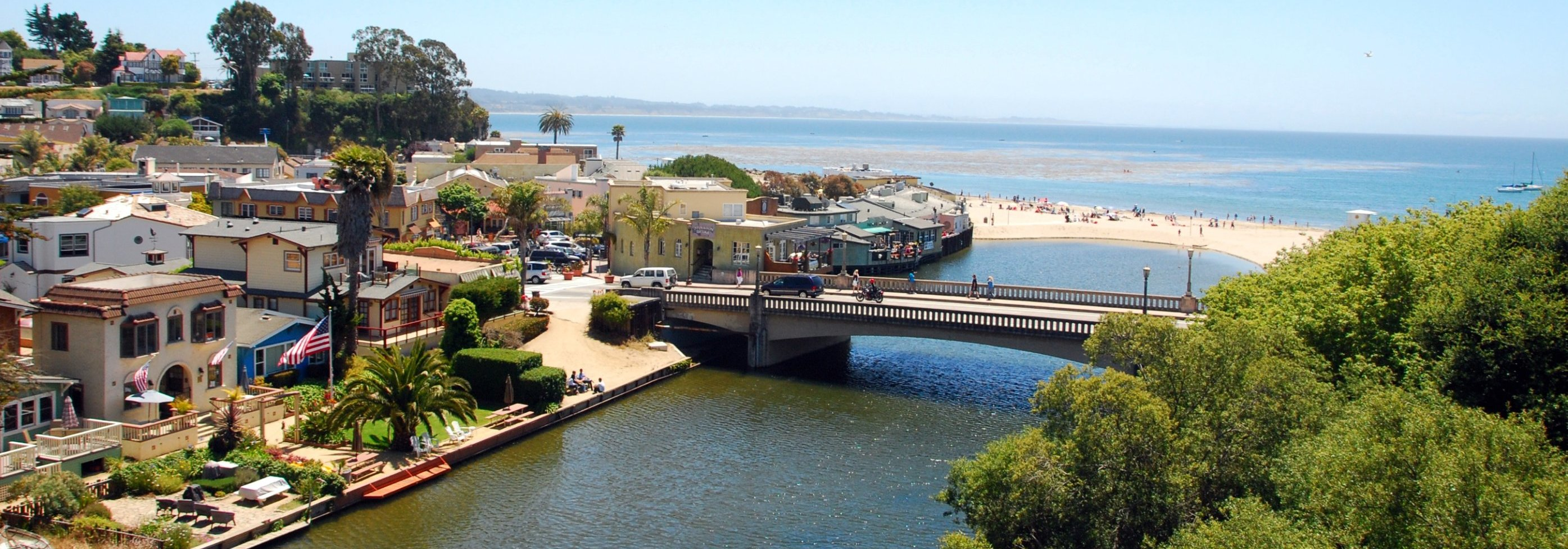
- Clockwise: Venetian Court; view towards Capitola Wharf; view of Capitola towards the Pacific Ocean; restaurants on the Soquel Creek waterfront.

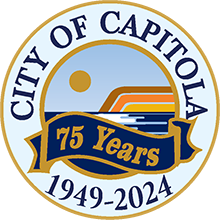
- Seal
- Interactive map of Capitola, California
- Location in the United States
- Coordinates: 36°58′35″N 121°57′17″W
- Country: United States
- State: California
- County: Santa Cruz
- Incorporated: January 11, 1949

Area
  - Total: 1.68 sq mi (4.34 km^{2})
  - Land: 1.59 sq mi (4.13 km^{2})
  - Water: 0.081 sq mi (0.21 km^{2}) 4.92%
- Elevation: 13 ft (4 m)

Population (2024)
  - Total: 9,938
  - Density: 6,232.9/sq mi (2,406.54/km^{2})
- Time zone: UTC−8 (PST)
  - Summer (DST): UTC−7 (PDT)
- ZIP Codes: 95010, 95062
- Area code: 831
- FIPS code: 06-11040
- GNIS feature IDs: 1658216, 2409981
- Website: cityofcapitola.gov

Capitola is a small seaside city in Santa Cruz County, California, United States. Capitola is located on the northern shores of Monterey Bay, on the Central Coast of California. The city had a population of 9,456 at the 2020 census. Capitola is a popular tourist destination, owing to its beaches and restaurants.

== History ==
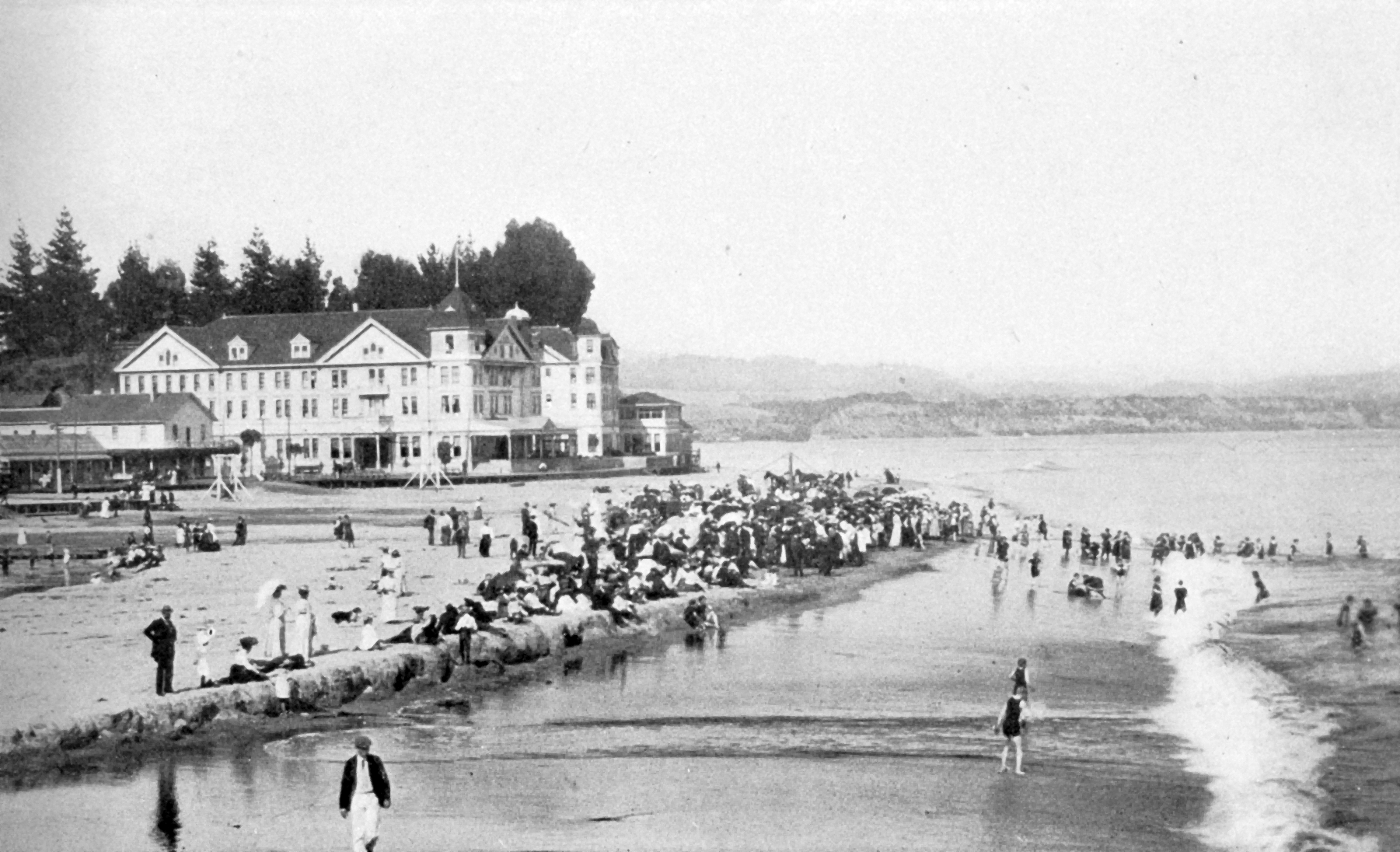
View of Capitola Beach in 1905

The original settlement now known as Capitola grew out of what was then called Soquel Landing. Soquel Landing got its name from a wharf located at the mouth of Soquel Creek. This wharf, which dates back to the 1850s, served as an outlet for the produce and lumber grown in the interior. In 1865, Captain John Pope Davenport, a whaleman at Monterey, moved his operations to be near the wharf. Unable to capture any whales, he moved his operations the following year to Point Año Nuevo.

In 1869, Frederick A. Hihn, who owned the property in the vicinity of the wharf, decided to develop it as a seaside resort. At first he leased the area to Samuel A. Hall and the area became known as Camp Capitola. Most authorities believe that it was Hihn who chose the name of Capitola, but they are unsure as to why he did so. Several possibilities have been asserted, one being that it was named for the heroine of The Hidden Hand, a novel by the popular author E. D. E. N. Southworth, favored by Hall's daughter Lulu. Capitola is known as the oldest beach resort on the West Coast.

In the summer of 1961 hundreds of birds attacked the town. Most of the birds were sooty shearwaters, a normally non-aggressive species that rarely comes to shore. Alfred Hitchcock was a regular visitor to nearby Santa Cruz and read about this episode. He went on to direct a film—The Birds—based on the idea of hundreds of birds attacking humans. The reason for this attack remained unknown for over 25 years until it was discovered that the birds had been affected by domoic acid, a toxin produced by red algae.

The Capitola Classic was a skateboarding event held in Capitola village in the late 1970s and early 1980s. The Capitola Classic was known in skating circles for its annual downhill race, which was a head-to-head speed competition that drew top names in the sport, many local as well as international, including Santa Cruz, California local John Hutson, who held the world speed record for skateboarding at 53.45 mph and dominated the event each year. Starting in 2009 efforts were made to revive the event.

On March 24, 2011, a drainage pipe burst following heavy rains, sending a surge of water through the historic village area. Two days later cleanup operations were interrupted when the area was flooded again.

== Geography ==
Capitola Village is located at the beach by the mouth of Soquel Creek.

According to the United States Census Bureau, the city has a total area of 1.7 square miles (4.4 square kilometers), of which 1.6 square miles (4.1 km^{2}) is land and 0.1 square miles (0.26 km^{2}) (4.92%) is water.

Capitola sits on the northeast shore of Monterey Bay. Cliffs mark access to several popular beaches, including New Brighton Beach, or drop directly to the rocky shoreline of the bay. Capitola Village sits in a depression among the cliffs so that the popular tourist and shopping area leads directly to Capitola Beach. Colorful houses and hotels line the slopes of the town leading back up to the clifftops.

The Venetian Court sits on the beach just east of the pier and is on the Register of National Historic Places as "The first Condominium Beach Community in the United States, built in 1924".

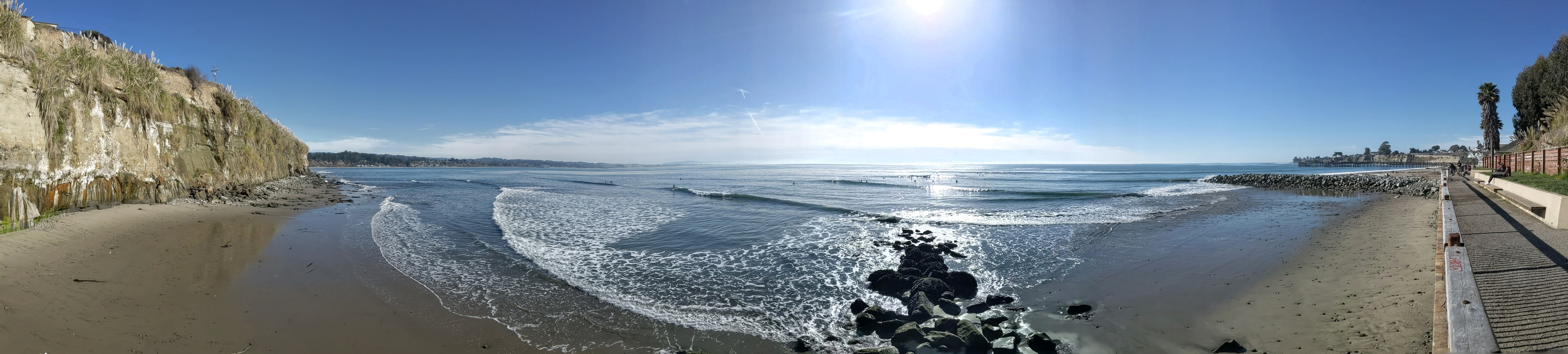
View of Capitola Beach and the Pacific Ocean from the southeast end of Esplanade Park

=== Climate ===
Capitola has mild weather throughout the year, enjoying a Mediterranean climate (Köppen Csb) characterized by cool, wet winters and warm, mostly dry summers. Due to its proximity to Monterey Bay, fog and low overcast are common during the night and morning hours, especially in the summer.

Climate data for Capitola, CA
Month	Jan	Feb	Mar	Apr	May	Jun	Jul	Aug	Sep	Oct	Nov	Dec	Year
Mean daily maximum °F (°C)	60.6 (15.9)	62.3 (16.8)	64.4 (18.0)	67.5 (19.7)	70.1 (21.2)	72.9 (22.7)	73.4 (23.0)	74.3 (23.5)	74.5 (23.6)	71.5 (21.9)	64.9 (18.3)	60.0 (15.6)	68.0 (20.0)
Mean daily minimum °F (°C)	40.8 (4.9)	42.7 (5.9)	44.0 (6.7)	45.5 (7.5)	48.6 (9.2)	51.5 (10.8)	53.7 (12.1)	53.9 (12.2)	52.6 (11.4)	49.0 (9.4)	44.3 (6.8)	40.8 (4.9)	47.3 (8.5)
Average precipitation inches (mm)	6.40 (163)	6.24 (158)	4.67 (119)	1.99 (51)	0.85 (22)	0.19 (4.8)	0.01 (0.25)	0.04 (1.0)	0.27 (6.9)	1.44 (37)	3.75 (95)	5.68 (144)	31.53 (801)
Average precipitation days (≥ 0.01 in)	10.6	10.9	10.0	5.9	3.3	1.3	0.3	0.7	1.5	3.5	7.5	10.7	66.2
Source: NOAA

== Demographics ==
Historical population
Census	Pop.	Note	%±
1950	1,848		—
1960	2,021		9.4%
1970	5,080		151.4%
1980	9,095		79.0%
1990	10,171		11.8%
2000	10,033		−1.4%
2010	9,918		−1.1%
2020	9,938		0.2%
2023 (est.)	9,572	▼	−3.7%
U.S. Decennial Census

=== 2020 census ===
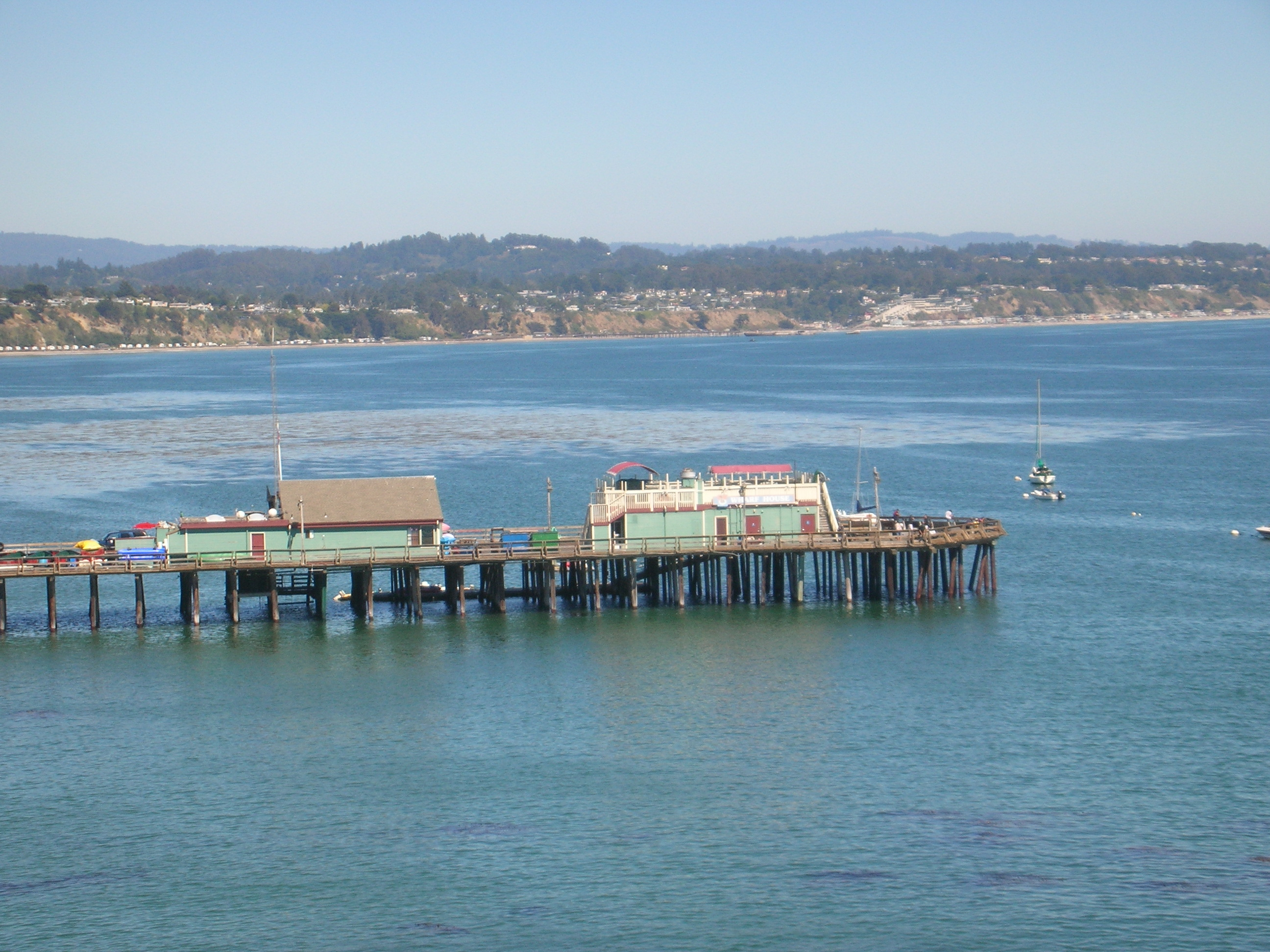
Capitola Wharf, built 1857

As of the 2020 census, Capitola had a population of 9,938. The population density was 6,234.6 inhabitants per square mile (2,407.2/km^{2}). The median age was 46.8 years, and the age distribution was 14.5% under 18, 7.0% from 18 to 24, 26.6% from 25 to 44, 28.0% from 45 to 64, and 23.9% age 65 or older. For every 100 females, there were 87.3 males, and for every 100 females age 18 and over there were 84.6 males age 18 and over.

The census reported that 98.1% of the population lived in households, 1.0% lived in non-institutionalized group quarters, and 0.9% were institutionalized. Capitola was 100.0% urban and 0.0% rural.

There were 4,624 households, of which 21.2% had children under age 18. Of all households, 35.3% were married-couple households, 8.7% were cohabiting-couple households, 20.1% were households with a male householder and no spouse or partner present, and 35.9% were households with a female householder and no spouse or partner present. About 37.1% of households were one person households, and 18.3% were one person aged 65 or older. The average household size was 2.11, and there were 2,409 families (52.1% of all households).

There were 5,485 housing units at an average density of 3,441.0 units per square mile (1,328.6 units/km^{2}), of which 4,624 (84.3%) were occupied and 861 (15.7%) were vacant. Of the occupied units, 48.1% were owner-occupied and 51.9% were renter-occupied. The homeowner vacancy rate was 1.2%, and the rental vacancy rate was 3.4%.

Racial composition as of the 2020 census
Race	Number	Percent
White	6,864	69.1%
Black or African American	109	1.1%
American Indian and Alaska Native	102	1.0%
Asian	499	5.0%
Native Hawaiian and Other Pacific Islander	15	0.2%
Some other race	984	9.9%
Two or more races	1,365	13.7%
Hispanic or Latino (of any race)	2,227	22.4%

=== Income and poverty ===
In 2023, the US Census Bureau estimated that the median household income was $96,412, and the per capita income was $60,609. About 10.9% of families and 13.9% of the population were below the poverty line.

=== 2010 census ===
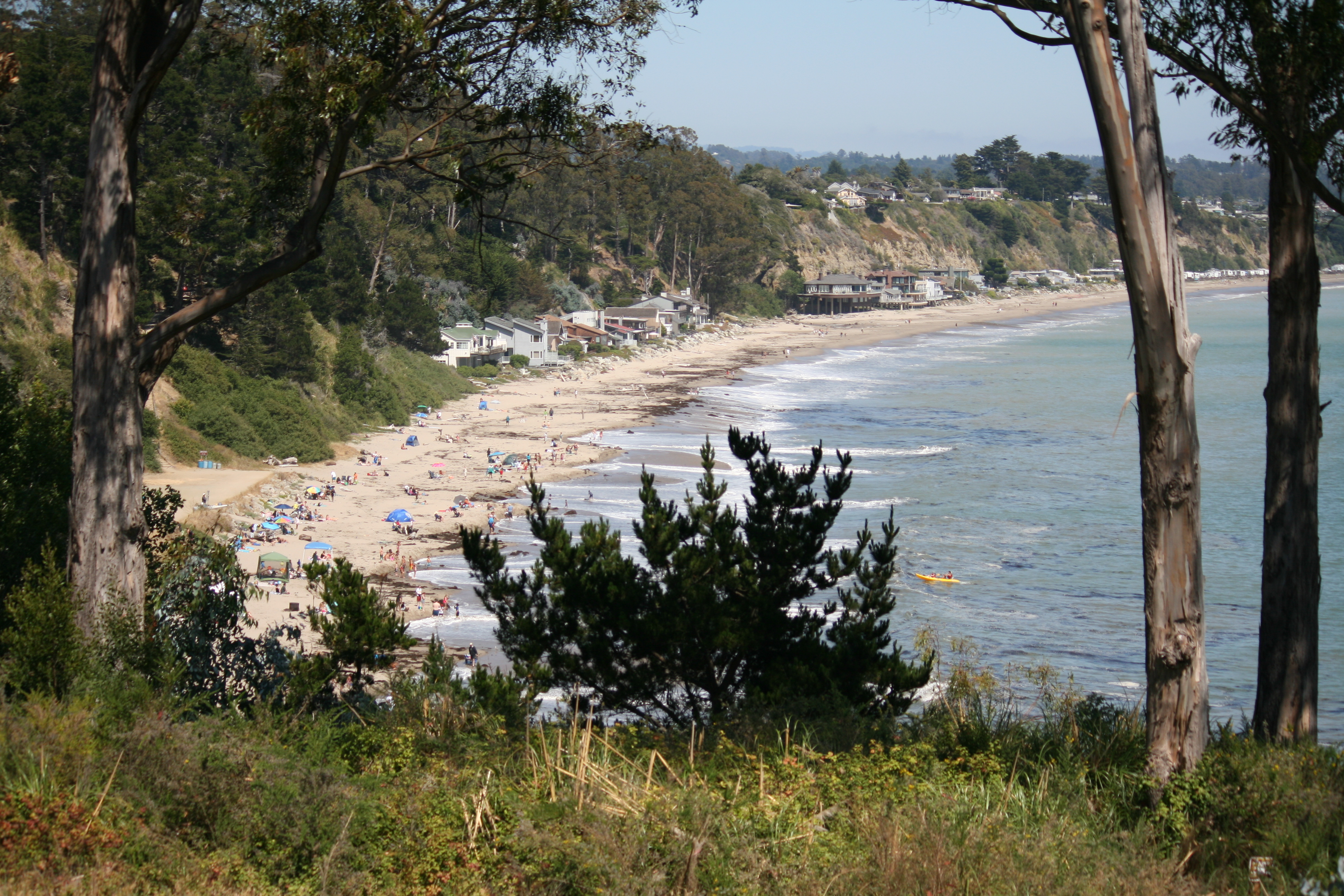
New Brighton State Beach

The 2010 United States census reported that Capitola had a population of 9,918. The population density was 5,919.0 inhabitants per square mile (2,285.3 inhabitants per square kilometer). The racial makeup of Capitola was 7,963 (80.3%) White, 123 (1.2%) African American, 59 (0.6%) Native American, 424 (4.3%) Asian, 10 (0.1%) Pacific Islander, 869 (8.8%) from other races, and 470 (4.7%) from two or more races. Hispanic or Latino of any race were 1,957 persons (19.7%).

The Census reported that 9,770 people (98.5% of the population) lived in households, 25 (0.3%) lived in non-institutionalized group quarters, and 123 (1.2%) were institutionalized.

There were 4,626 households, out of which 1,011 (21.9%) had children under the age of 18 living in them, 1,515 (32.7%) were opposite-sex married couples living together, 539 (11.7%) had a female householder with no husband present, 232 (5.0%) had a male householder with no wife present. There were 339 (7.3%) unmarried opposite-sex partnerships, and 55 (1.2%) same-sex married couples or partnerships. Of the households, 1,735 (37.5%) were made up of individuals, and 608 (13.1%) had someone living alone who was 65 years of age or older. The average household size was 2.11. There were 2,286 families (49.4% of all households); the average family size was 2.78.

The population was spread out, with 1,643 people (16.6%) under the age of 18, 930 people (9.4%) aged 18 to 24, 2,801 people (28.2%) aged 25 to 44, 3,005 people (30.3%) aged 45 to 64, and 1,539 people (15.5%) who were 65 years of age or older. The median age was 41.9 years. For every 100 females, there were 90.8 males. For every 100 females age 18 and over, there were 86.4 males.

There were 5,534 housing units at an average density of 3,302.7 units per square mile (1,275.2 units/km^{2}), of which 2,152 (46.5%) were owner-occupied, and 2,474 (53.5%) were occupied by renters. The homeowner vacancy rate was 2.3%; the rental vacancy rate was 4.8%. 4,430 people (44.7% of the population) lived in owner-occupied housing units and 5,340 people (53.8%) lived in rental housing units.

== Economy ==
Capitola Village and Esplanade is the heart of the Capitola Retail and Tourism Hub, being a draw for tourist and locals alike, with a variety of boutiques and restaurants. Forty-first Avenue is the retail and business corridor for a majority of larger national and regional business serving the community as a whole. The Capitola Mall, the only enclosed regional shopping center, in Santa Cruz County is slated for redevelopment into a mixed use project with increasing pressure due to the failure of the traditional mall concept.

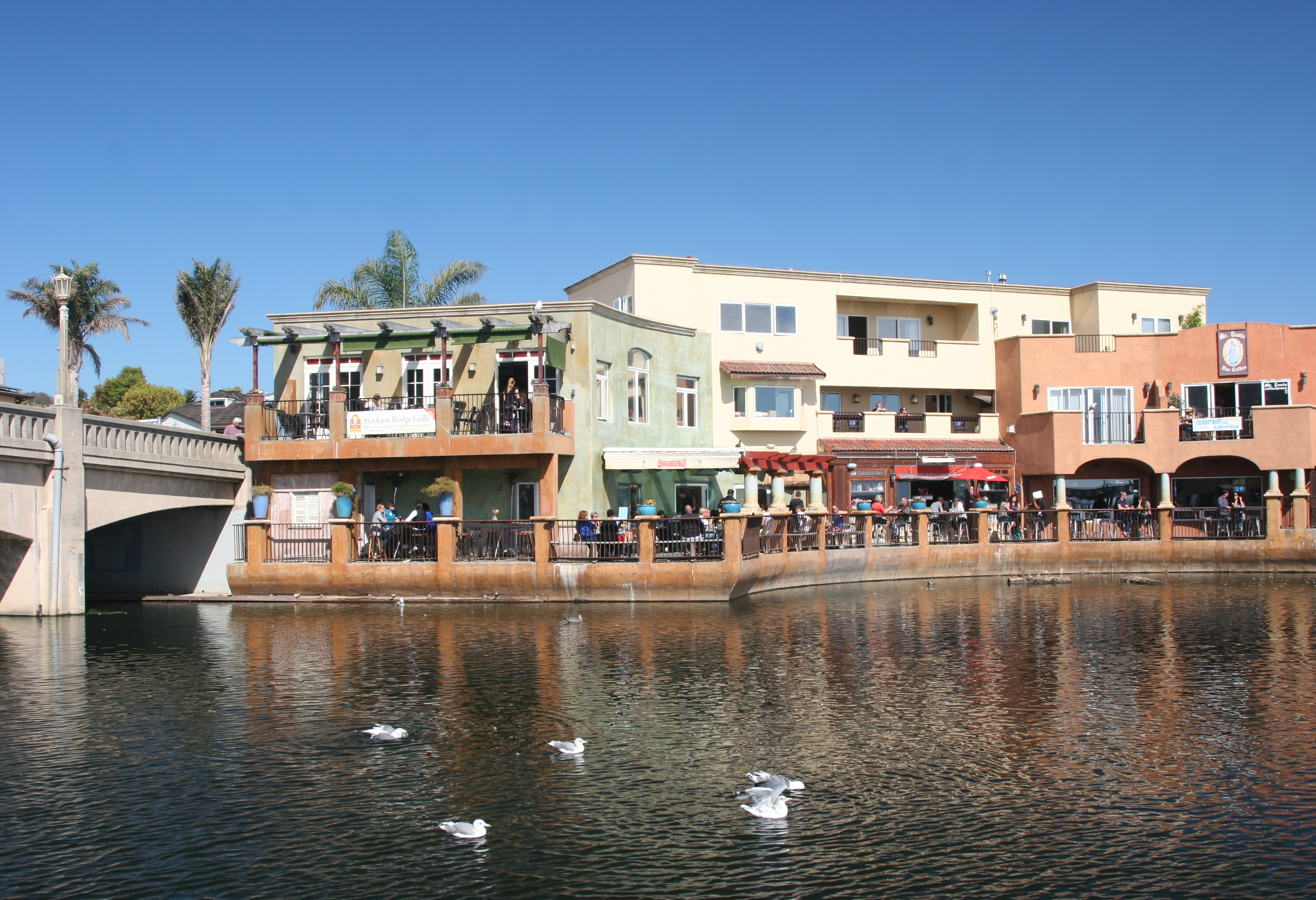
Waterfront restaurants on Soquel Creek near Capitola Beach

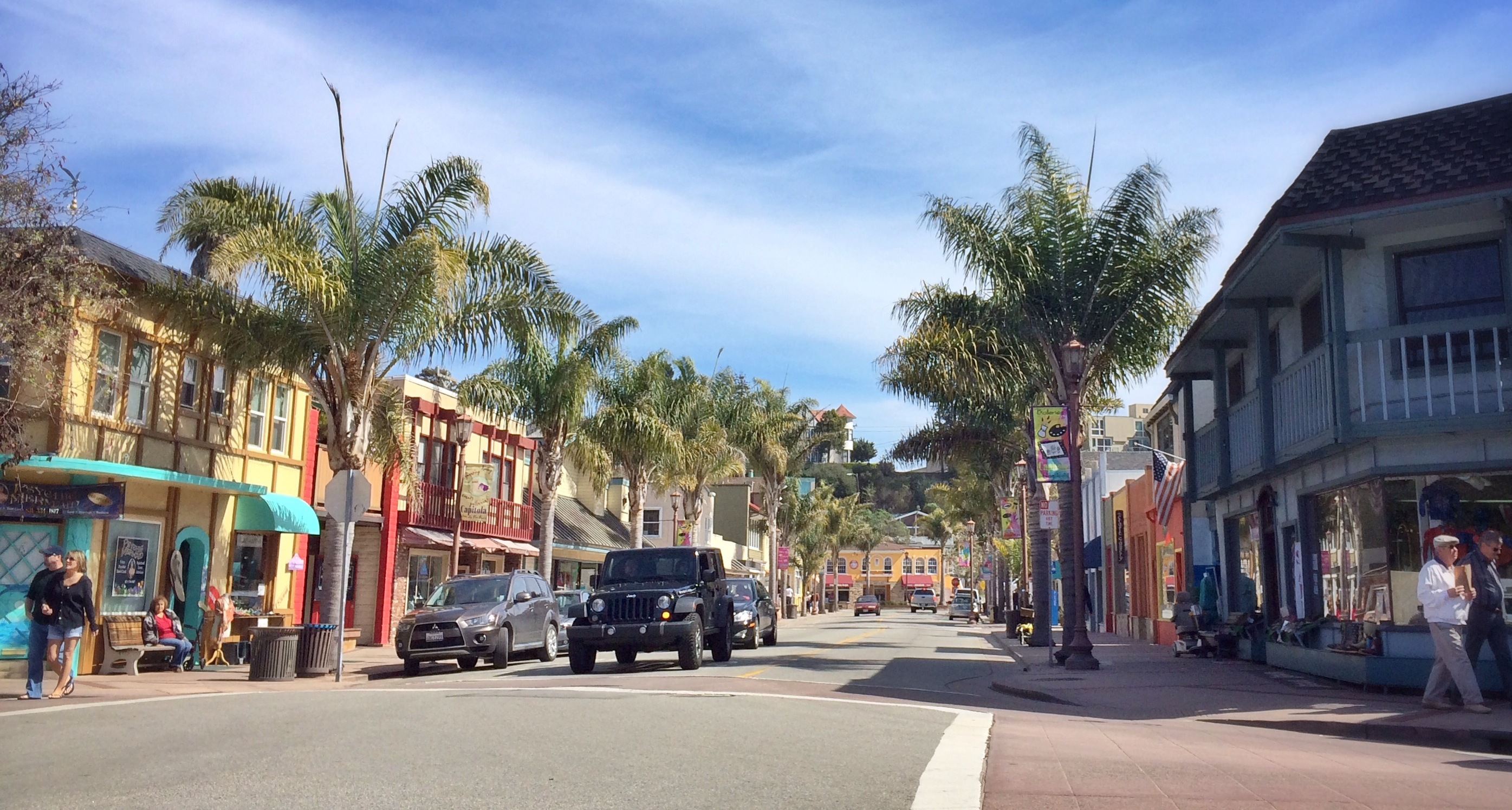
Shops on the Esplanade

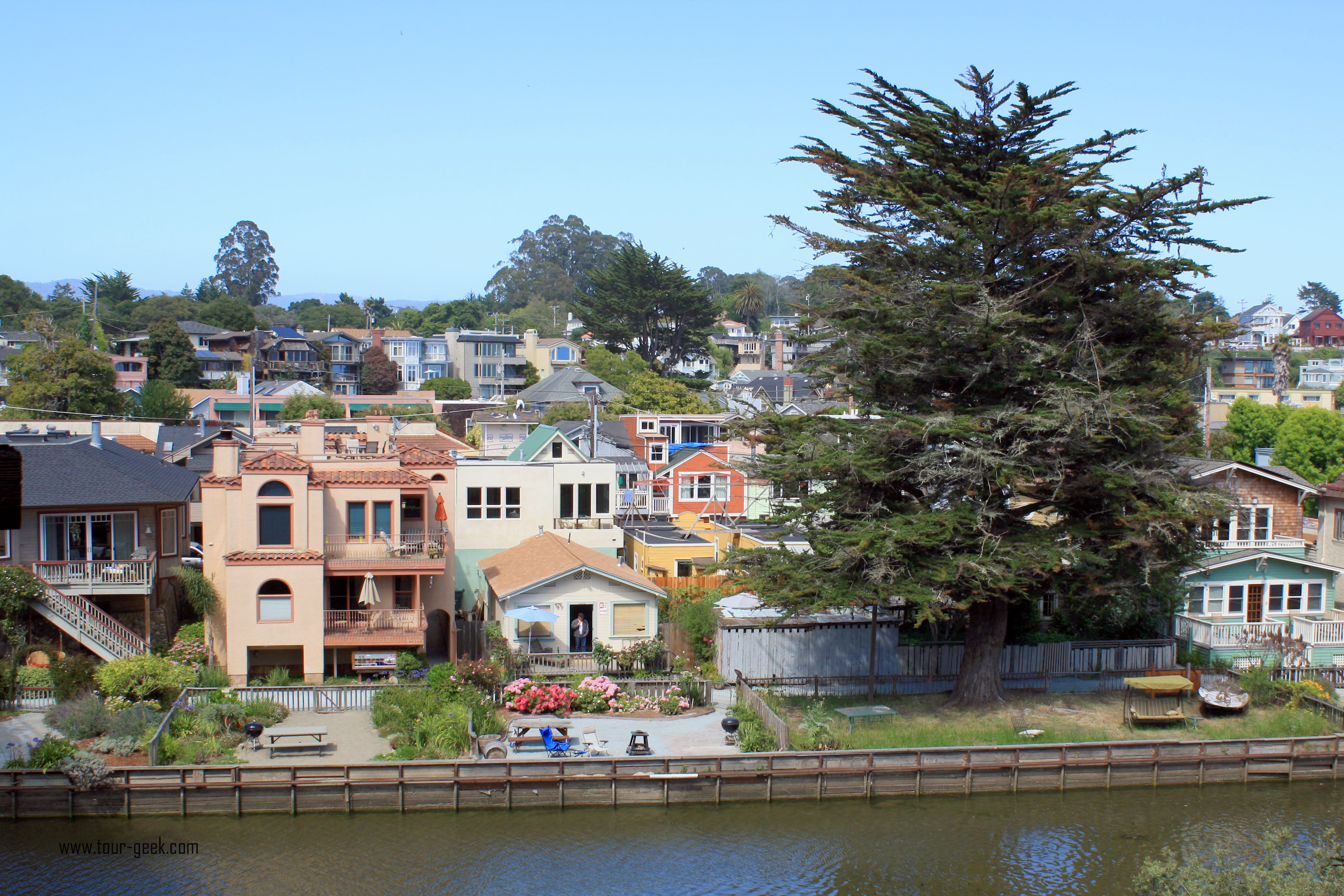
Riverview Historic District, located along Soquel Creek

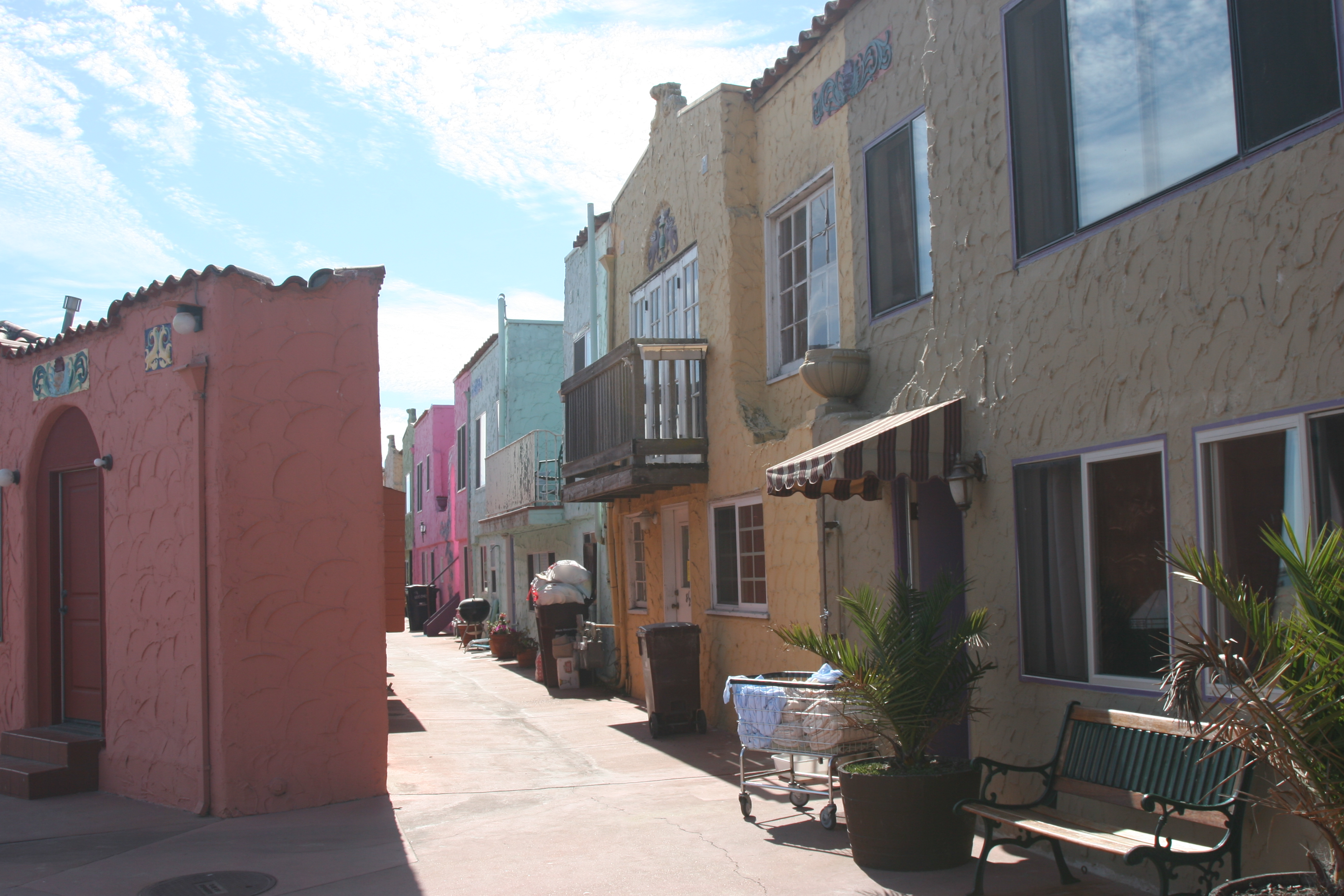
Mission Revival style Venetian Court, built in 1924

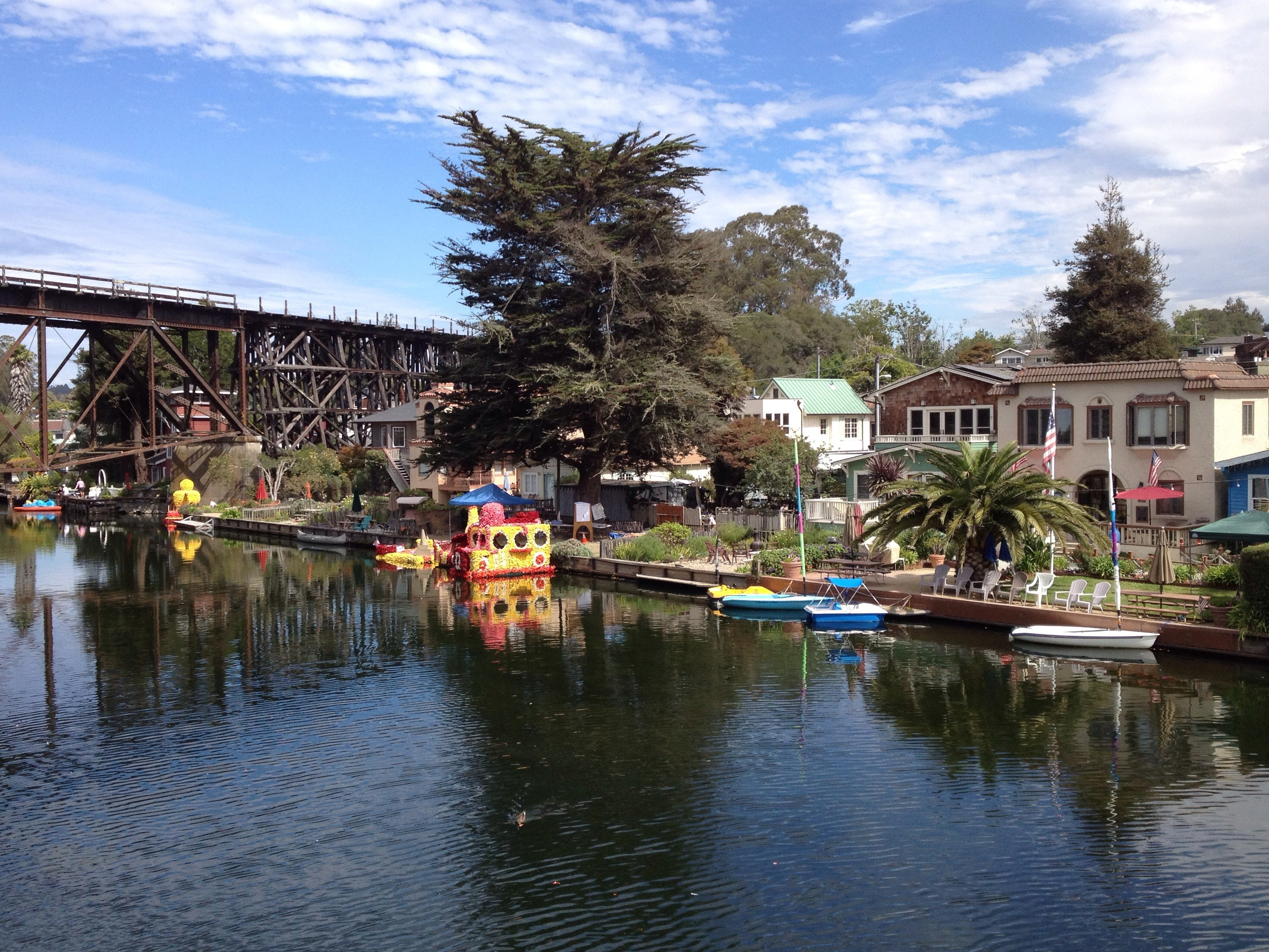
Houses located on Soquel Creek

=== Top employers ===
According to Capitola's 2023 Annual Comprehensive Financial Report, the principal employers in the city are:

#	Employer	# of Employees
1	Subaru, Toyota, Kia of Santa Cruz	224
2	Soquel Union Elementary School District	172
3	Target	166
4	Culinary Enterprises Inc	158
5	Shadowbrook Restaurant Pacific Coast Manor	150
6	Gayle's Bakery & Rosticceria	141
7	Trader Joe's	139
8	City of Capitola	127
9	Whole Foods Market	120
10	Oceanside Supported Living	120

== Government ==
Capitola is administered by a City Council which is made up of a Mayor, Vice-Mayor and three Councilmembers. The seats are rotated by the council annually, the current Mayor is Joe Clarke since January 30, 2025.

In the California State Legislature, Capitola is in the 17th senatorial district, represented by Democrat John Laird, and in the 30th Assembly district, represented by Democrat Dawn Addis.

In the United States House of Representatives, Capitola is in the California's 19th congressional district, represented by Democrat Jimmy Panetta.

== Infrastructure ==
The city has its own police department and receives fire and medical services from the Central Fire District of Santa Cruz County.

== Notable people ==
- Harry Hooper (1887–1974), major-league baseball player, was the postmaster in Capitola for 24 years after he retired from baseball
- Ralph Peduto (1942–2014), actor and playwright
- Derek Sherinian (born 1966), rock keyboardist (Alice Cooper, Kiss, Dream Theater, Billy Idol), went to Capitola Elementary and Capitola Junior High School. His mother and sister still reside and own a dress store in Capitola Village.
- Skip Spence (1946–1999), the founding member of Moby Grape and former member of The Jefferson Airplane, resided in Capitola during the latter years of his life
- Robert Anton Wilson (1932–2007), author and philosopher

== See also ==
- St. John the Baptist Church
