= Ishmael (Southworth novel) =

Novel by Southwortth

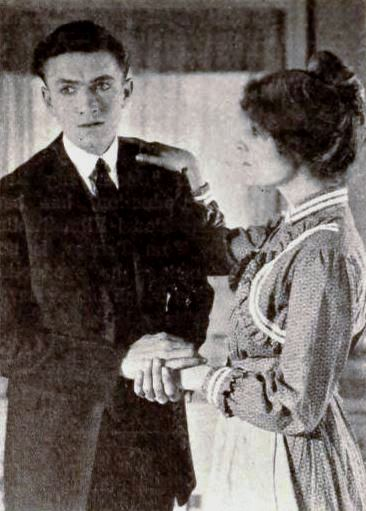
A still from Hearts of Youth (1921), based on the novel Ishmael

Ishmael is a novel written by E.D.E.N. Southworth. Ishmael is the hero of the 1863–64 serialization Self-Made; or Out of the Depths. He is of low birth but has worked to establish himself in society as a lawyer. He understands the suffering endured by his mother and seeks to protect women through his knowledge of the law. Southworth is credited as contributing the "self-made man" character to literature with this novel. Ishmael and its sequel Self-Raised were both huge successes. In 1921, Ishmael was turned into a motion picture called Hearts of Youth.

== See also ==
- The Hidden Hand (novel)
- New York Ledger
- The National Era
