= Hearts of Youth =

1921 film

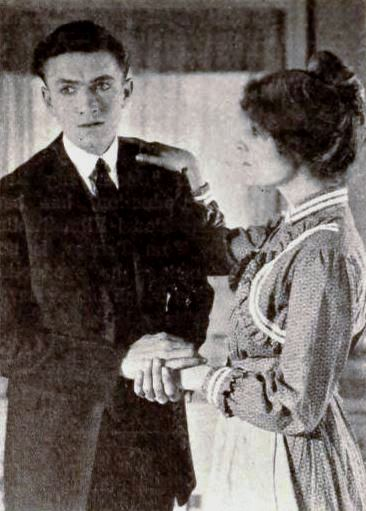
- Still with Harold Goodwin and Lillian Hall
- Directed by: Tom Miranda; Millard Webb
- Screenplay by: Millard Webb
- Based on: Ishmael by E. D. E. N. Southworth
- Starring: Harold Goodwin; Lillian Hall
- Cinematography: Walter Williams
- Production company: Fox Film Corporation
- Distributed by: Fox Film Corporation
- Release date: May 1921
- Country: United States
- Language: Silent (English intertitles)

Hearts of Youth is a lost 1921 American silent film based on the novel Ishmael by E. D. E. N. Southworth. The film was directed by Tom Miranda and Millard Webb, with Webb writing the adaptation for the screen. The movie stars Harold Goodwin, Colin Kenny, and Iris Ashton, and was released by the Fox Film Corporation

== Plot ==
Ishmael Worth renounces his young sweetheart, Beatrice, because he believes himself to be illegitimate and does not want to bring shame to her. Later it is revealed that his mother and father had married. His father's previous wife, thought to be dead, turns up to confront him; but the fact that the first wife was a bigamist makes her marriage to Ishmael's father null and void and the marriage between his mother and father therefore valid. Ishmael, having a legitimate father, now can give Beatrice an honest name.

== Cast ==
- Iris Ashton as Mrs. Grey
- Glen Cavender as Reuben Grey
- George Fisher as Herman Brudenell
- Grace Goodall as Countess Hurstmonceaus
- Harold Goodwin as Ishmael Worth
- Lillian Hall as Beatrice Merlin
- Colin Kenny as Lord Vincent
- Fred Kirby as Judge Merlin
