= Retribution (Southworth novel) =

1849 novel by E. D. E. N. Southworth

Retribution; or The Vale of Shadows: A Tale of Passion was a novel written by E. D. E. N. Southworth in 1849.

Retribution was serialized in The National Era in 1849 and was published in book form the same year. It launched Southworth's career as a writer of popular fiction.
