= Capitola Mall =

Coordinates: 36.97594°N 121.96728°W

- Location: Capitola, California
- Opened: 1977
- Developer: Macerich
- Manager: Merlone Grier
- Num. of stores: 100+
- Num. of anchor tenants: 4 (3 open, 1 vacant)
- Floor area: 584,419 square feet (54,294.3 m^{2})
- Floors: 1 (2 in Macy's and Target)

Capitola Mall is a shopping mall located in Capitola, California. It was managed and owned by Macerich before being sold to Merlone Geier Partners in April 2016. The mall sits on the northern edge of the Monterey Bay in Santa Cruz County. Capitola Mall is located on 41st Avenue just off Highway 1 at Capitola Road in Capitola. Capitola Mall opened in 1977, and was renovated and expanded in 1988/89. It is the only enclosed regional shopping center in Santa Cruz County. Anchor stores are Kohl's, Macy's, and Target.

== History ==
Opened in 1977 with anchors Mervyn's and Sears, Capitola Mall was renovated and expanded in 1988/89 to comprise four department stores with the addition of JCPenney and Gottschalks, and about 100 specialty shops and restaurants. In Spring 2002, Macy's replaced JCPenney, which closed in 2000. In 2008, Mervyn's closed and was replaced by Kohl's in 2009. Meanwhile, Gottschalks closed in 2009 and was replaced by Target.

On August 22, 2018, Sears announced that its store would be closing as part of a plan to close 46 stores nationwide. The store closed in November 2018.
