= Venetian Court =

- Venetian Court Apartments
- U.S. National Register of Historic Places
- U.S. Historic district
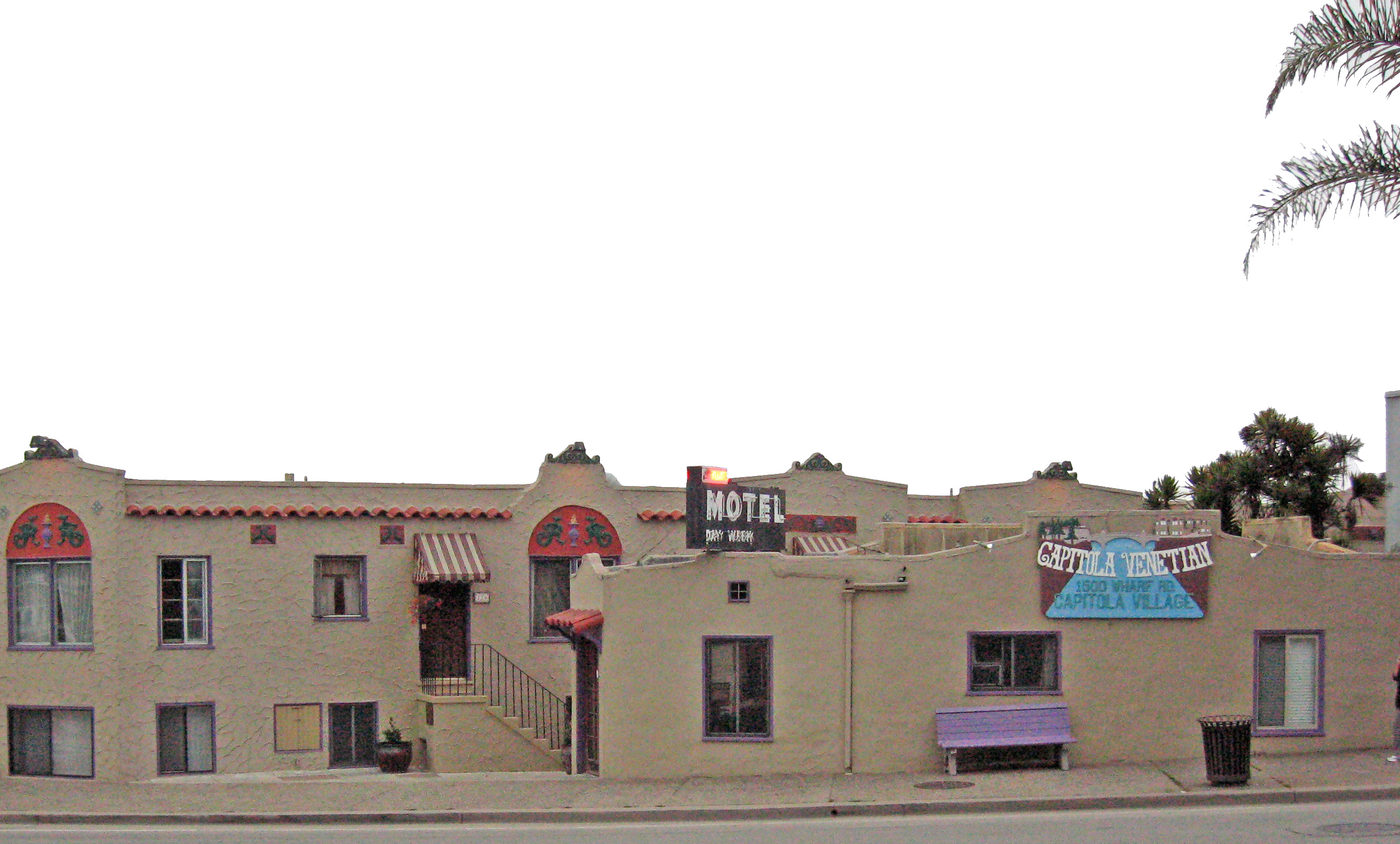

- Location within California
- Location: 1500 Wharf Road, Capitola, California
- Coordinates: 36°58′19″N 121°57′11″W
- Area: 1 acre (0.40 ha)
- Built: 1925
- Architect: Henry J. Roth; Wolfe & Higgins
- Architectural style: Mediterranean Revival, Mission Revival, and Spanish Colonial Revival
- NRHP reference No.: 87000574
- Added to NRHP: April 2, 1987

Venetian Court, also known as the Venetian Court Apartments, is a residential seaside resort located in Capitola, California. Construction of Venetian Court, in the Mediterranean Revival, Spanish Colonial Revival, and Mission Revival architecture styles, began in 1924 and continued for several years.

== History ==
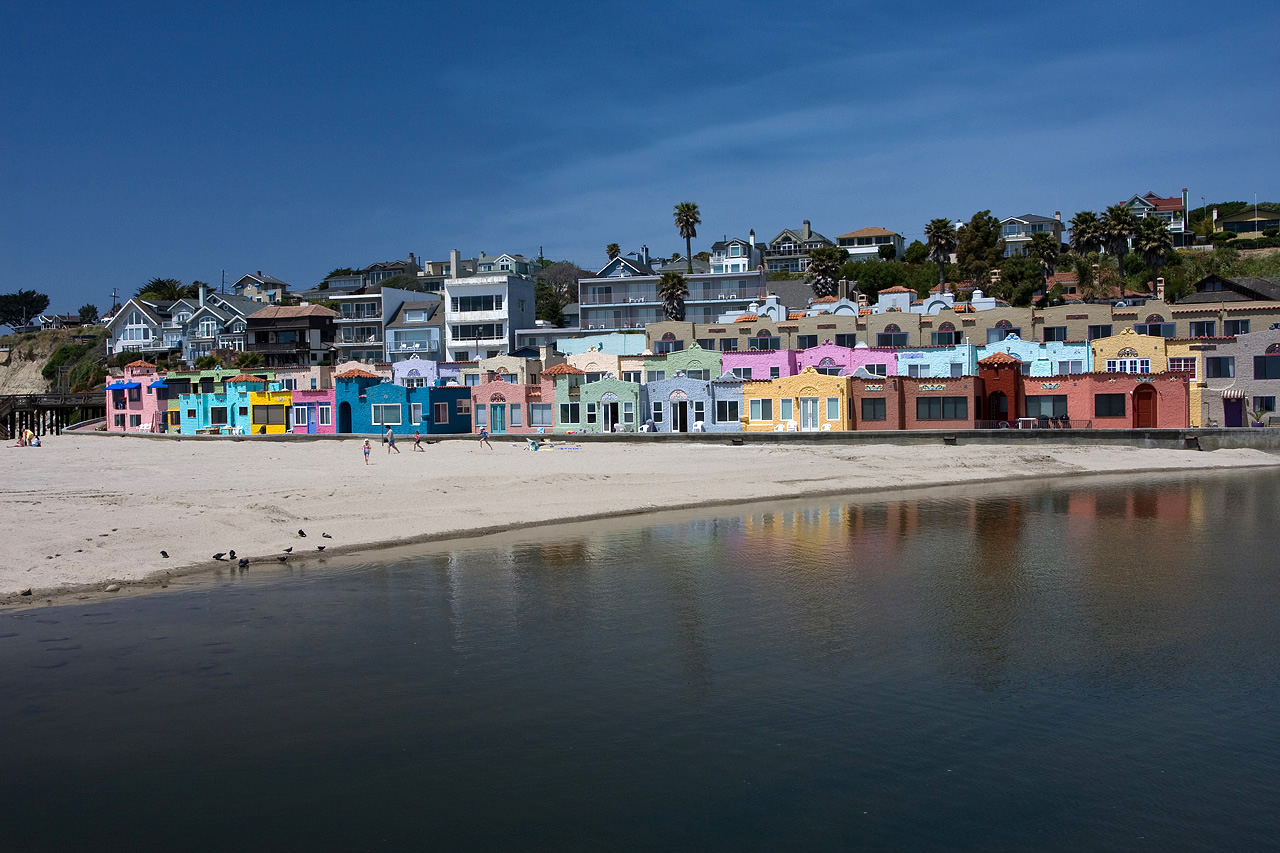
The beach side of the hotel

On April 2, 1987, Venetian Court was listed as site 87000574 on the National Register of Historic Places as one of the first condominium seaside developments in California, and is in a United States Historic District.

The two rows of colorful units nearest to the beach, as shown in the picture below, are privately owned condos (many of which are available as vacation rentals by owner). The large brown building in the back row (nearest to the street) is now operated as the "Capitola Venetian Hotel".

Since its development, Venetian Court has been threatened by sea level rise, king tides and annual winter storms which have often required extensive repairs. Despite this risk, homes continue to sell at over $5 million per unit.
