= St. John the Baptist Church (Capitola, California) =

The Episcopal Church of St. John the Baptist was a historic chapel in Capitola, California from 1889 to 2009.

== History ==
The first meeting of an Episcopal Church group in the area was on June 24, 1889, the feast day of Saint John the Baptist. Services were held in private homes while money was slowly raised to build a church named for the saint. In 1897 Frederick A. Hind donated land at 216 Oakland Avenue, at 36°58′30″N 121°56′52″W on the bluff above his resort called Depot Hill. The cross street was named Railroad Avenue at the time (after the railroad depot there) but is now Escalona Drive. The first service was held August 10, 1898. It was formally consecrated by Bishop William Ford Nichols on June 24, 1899. The church was designed as a smaller replica of an English church.

By 1961 the parish began considering ideas for relocation. In 1963 the parish hall was closed after being declared unsafe by the Capitola Fire Department. Zoning issues prevent expansion at the Depot Hill site. In 1985 the leadership of the parish decided to move to a larger location. The original chapel seated only 85, and the congregation wanted capacity for 300.

== New site ==
In 1989 a new site was selected on vacant land in Aptos, California near Seacliff State Beach a few miles to the south at 36°58′38″N 121°54′45″W on McGregor Drive. In 1991 the congregation purchased the land jointly with the Santa Cruz Housing Authority. Besides 39 affordable condominium units, a small neighborhood park was also planned. Warren Callister was selected as architect. After two years of applying for permits, the Santa Cruz County Planning Commission approved the plan on May 24, 2006. The new road to the development was named Canterbury Drive at their request. The new site was designed with drought-tolerant landscaping and a 30,000 US gallons (110,000 L) rainwater collection tank. The new building opened in June 2009. The old property was sold for over $2.5 million for use as a residence.

The church is part of the Episcopal Diocese of El Camino Real. As of 2010 the Rector was Steve Ellis.
