= E. D. E. N. Southworth =

American novelist

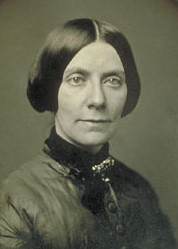
- Southworth, c. 1860
- Born: Emma Nevitte; December 26, 1819; Washington, D.C., U.S.
- Died: June 30, 1899 (aged 79); Georgetown, Washington, D.C., U.S.
- Resting place: Oak Hill Cemetery; Washington, D.C., U.S.
- Occupation: Novelist
- Spouse: Frederick H. Southworth
- Writing career
- Notable work: The Hidden Hand

Emma Dorothy Eliza Nevitte Southworth (December 26, 1819 – June 30, 1899) was an American writer of more than 60 novels in the latter part of the 19th century. She was the most popular American novelist of her day.

In her novels, her heroines often challenge modern perceptions of Victorian feminine domesticity by showing virtue as naturally allied to wit, adventure, and rebellion to remedy any unfortunate situation. Though The Hidden Hand (1859) was her most popular novel, Southworth's favorite of her works was her novel Ishmael (1876).

== Early life and education ==
E. D. E. N. Southworth was born Emma Nevitte on December 26, 1819, in Washington, D.C., to Susannah Wailes and Charles LeCompte Nevitte, a Virginia merchant. Her father died in 1824, and per his deathbed request she was christened Emma Dorothy Eliza Nevitte. She studied in a school kept by her stepfather, Joshua L. Henshaw. She later recalled her childhood as a lonely one, with her happiest moments spent exploring the Tidewater region in Maryland on horseback. During those rides, she acquired an abiding interest in the area's history and folklore. After attending her stepfather's school, she completed her secondary education in 1835 at the age of 15.

== Career ==
She then accepted a position as a schoolteacher. In 1840, she married inventor Frederick H. Southworth, of Utica, New York. She moved with her husband to Wisconsin, where she became a teacher. After 1843, she returned to Washington, D.C. without her husband and with two young children. After the birth of their second child, Frederick abandoned his family in search of Brazilian gold. Southworth never divorced her husband on conscientious grounds.

In 1844, she began to write stories to support herself and her children. Her first story, "The Irish Refugee", was published in the Baltimore Saturday Visiter. Some of her earliest works appeared in The National Era, the newspaper that printed Uncle Tom's Cabin. The bulk of her work appeared as a serial in The New York Ledger. In 1857, Southworth signed a contract to write exclusively for this publication, although the Ledger provided her work to The London Journal for publication in Britain during this period of exclusivity.

The exclusive contract Southworth signed with Bonner in 1856 and royalties from her published novels earned her about $10,000 a year, making her one of the country's best-paid writers. Southworth and her children were in ill health through much of the 1850s, but Bonner's contract guaranteed her income regardless of any periods of inactivity brought on by poor health. This arrangement remained intact for 30 years.

Like her friend Harriet Beecher Stowe, she was a supporter of social change and women's rights, but she was not nearly as active on these issues. Her first novel, Retribution, a serial for the National Era, published in book form in 1849, was so well received that she gave up teaching and became a regular contributor to various periodicals, especially the New York Ledger. She lived in Georgetown, until 1876, then in Yonkers, New York, and again in Georgetown, where she died on June 8, 1899. Georgetown University Library has an exhibition on her home and work.

Her best known work, The Hidden Hand, first appeared in serial form in the New York Ledger in 1859, and was serialized twice more (1868–69, 1883) before being published as a book in 1888. Bonner used the appeal of the novel to "give an occasional boost to his weekly's already massive circulation." It features Capitola Black, a tomboyish protagonist who finds herself in a myriad of adventures. Southworth stated that nearly every adventure of her heroine came from real life. Most of Southworth's novels deal with the Southern United States during the post-American Civil War era. She wrote over sixty; some of them were translated into German, French, Chinese, Icelandic and Spanish; in 1872, an edition of thirty-five volumes was published in Philadelphia.

Bonner was asked by a reporter in 1889 "Who were your most successful story writers?" His reply was: "Mrs. Southworth and Sylvanus Cobb Jr. I think that the most popular and successful stories ever printed as serials were Cobb's 'The Gunmaker of Moscow' and Mrs. Southworth's 'Hidden Hand.' "

Her novel Tried for Her Life was referenced in chapter 8 of Jack Finney's novel Time and Again.

She was a member of the Woman's National Press Association.

== Death ==
Southworth died in Georgetown, on June 30, 1899. She is buried in Oak Hill Cemetery in Washington, D.C.

== Bibliography ==
Most of Southworth's novels were serialized before their publications, sometimes under different titles, but online copies of many of the publications can be accessed at Project Gutenberg.

- Retribution; or The Vale of Shadows: A Tale of Passion (1849)
- The Deserted Wife (1850)
- The Mother-in-Law; or The Isle of Rays / Married In Haste (1851)
- Shannondale / The Three Beauties (1851)
- Virginia and Magdalene; or The Foster Sisters / Two Sisters (1852)
- The Discarded Daughter; or the Children of the Isle: A Tale of the Chesapeake (1852)
- The Curse of Clifton (1852)
- Old Neighborhoods and New Settlements; or Christmas Evening Legends (1853)
- The Lost Heiress (1854)
- The Wife's Victory and Other Nouvellettes (1854)
- The Missing Bride; or, Miriam the Avenger (1855)
- The Widow's Son / Left Alone (1856)
- India: The Pearl of Pearl River (1856)
- Vivia; or The Secret of Power (1857)
- The Two Sisters (1858)
- The Lady of the Isle; or, The Island Princess (1859)
- The Haunted Homestead and Other Nouvellettes (1860)
- The Gipsy's Prophecy: A Tale of Real Life / The Bride Of An Evening (1861)
- Hickory Hall; or The Outcast: A Romance of the Blue Ridge / The Prince Of Darkness (1861)
- The Broken Engagement; or, Speaking theTruth for a Day (1862)
- Love's Labor Won (1862)
- The Fatal Marriage / Orville Deville (1863)
- The Bridal Eve / Rose Elmer (1864)
- Allworth Abbey / Eudora (1865)
- The Bride of Llewellyn (1866)
- The Fortune Seeker; or, The Bridal Day (1866)
- The Coral Lady; or The Bronzed Beauty of Paris (1867)
- Fair Play; or The Test of the Lone Isle (1868)
- How He Won Her: A Sequel to Fair Play (1869)
- The Changed Brides / Winning Her Way (1869)
- The Brides Fate: A Sequel to "The Changed Brides" (1869)
- The Family Doom; or The Sin of a Countess (1869)
- The Maiden Widow: A Sequel to the "Family Doom" (1870)
- The Christmas Guest; or The Crime and the Curse (1870)
- Cruel as the Grave / Hallow Eve Mystery (1871)
- Tried for Her Life (1871)
- The Lost Heir of Linlithgow / The Brothers (1872)
- The Noble Lord: The Sequel to "The Lost Heir of Linlithgow" (1872)
- A Beautiful Fiend; or, Through the Fire (1873)
- Victor's Triumphs: The Sequel to "A Beautiful Fiend" (1874)
- Mystery of Dark Hollow (1875)
- Ishmael; or, In the Depths (1876)
- Self-Raised; or, From the Depths: A Sequel to "Ishmael." (1876)
- The Red Hill Tragedy: A Novel (1877)
- The Bride's Ordeal: A Novel (1877)
- Her Love or Her Life: A Sequel to "The Bride's Ordeal: A Novel" (1877)
- The Phantom Wedding; or, The Fall of the House of Flint (1878)
- Sybil Brotherton: A Novel (1879)
- The Trail of the Serpent; or, The Homicide at Hawke Hall (1880)
- Why Did He Wed Her? (1881)
- For Whose Sake? A Sequel to "Why Did He Wed Her?" (1884)
- A Deed Without a Name (1886)
- Dorothy Harcourt's Secret: Sequel to a "A Deed Without a Name." (1886)
- To His Fate: A Sequel to "Dorothy Harcourt's Secret" (no date)
- When Love Gets Justice: A Sequel "To His Fate." (no date)
- The Hidden Hand (1888)
- A Leap in the Dark: A Novel (1889)
- Unknown; or the Mystery of Raven Rocks (1889)
- Nearest and Dearest: A Novel (1889)
- Little Nea's Engagement: A Sequel to "Nearest and Dearest." (1889)
- For Woman's Love: A Novel (1890)
- An Unrequited Love: a Sequel to For Woman's Love (1890)
- The Lost Lady of Lone (1876)
- The Unloved Wife: A Novel (1890)
- When the Shadow's Darken: A Sequel to the Unloved Wife (no date)
- Lilith: A Sequel to "The Unloved Wife" (1891)
- Gloria: A Novel (1891)
- David Lindsay: A Sequel to Gloria (1891)
- "Em": A Novel (1892)
- Em's Husband (1892)
- The Mysterious Marriage: A Sequel to "A Leap in the Dark" (1893)
- A Skeleton in the Closet: A Novel (1893)
- Brandon Coyle's Wife: A Sequel to "A Skeleton in the Closet" (1893)
- Only a Girl's Heart: A Novel (1893)
- The Rejected Bride (1894)
- Gertrude Haddon (1894)
- Sweet Love's Atonement: A Novel (1904)
- Zenobia's Suitors: Sequel to Sweet Love's Atonement (1904)
- The Struggle of a Soul: A Sequel to "The Lost Lady of Lone" (1904)
- Her Mother's Secret (1910)
- Love's Bitterest Cup: A Sequel to "Her Mother's Secret" (1910)
- When Shadow's Die: A Sequel to "Love's Bitterest Cup" (1910)
- The Bride's Dowry (1915)
- When Love Commands (no date)
- Fulfilling Her Destiny: A Sequel to When Love Commands (no date)
- The Initials: A Story of Modern Life (no date)
- Capitola's Peril: A Sequel to The Hidden Hand (no date)
- Beatrice; or, The Forsaken Daughter (no date)
- The Maiden's Vow (no date)
- The Refugee (no date)
- The Artist's Love (no date)
- Fallen Pride / The Mountain Girl's Love (no date)
- Spectre Lover (no date)
