= The Hidden Hand (novel) =

Serial novel E. D. E. N. Southworth

The Hidden Hand (or Capitola the Madcap) is a serial novel by E. D. E. N. Southworth first published in the New York Ledger in 1859, and was Southworth's most popular novel. It was serialized twice more, first in 1868–69 and then again 1883 (in slightly revised form), before first appearing in book form in 1888. The novel was also serialized in the London Guide to Literature, Science, Art, and General Information simultaneous to its first publication in the New York Ledger. The name of the novel was changed to The Masked Mother for the London edition.

The Hidden Hand features Capitola Black, a tomboyish protagonist who finds herself in myriad adventures. Southworth stated that nearly every adventure of her heroine came from real life. In the London version of the novel published by the Guide, the characters and action were revised and relocated. The Masked Mother takes place in the "hilly districts of North Wales" instead of Virginia, the protagonist is discovered in Dublin rather than New York, and the war segment of the novel is also shifted from Mexico to Crimea. Some characters retain their original names, including the villain Black Donald, while others are shifted to Irish and Scottish associations.

The book reportedly sold nearly two million copies. A sequel was released called Capitola's Peril.

It was also adapted into a play numerous times, and performed in venues across the United States and in London.

== Characters ==
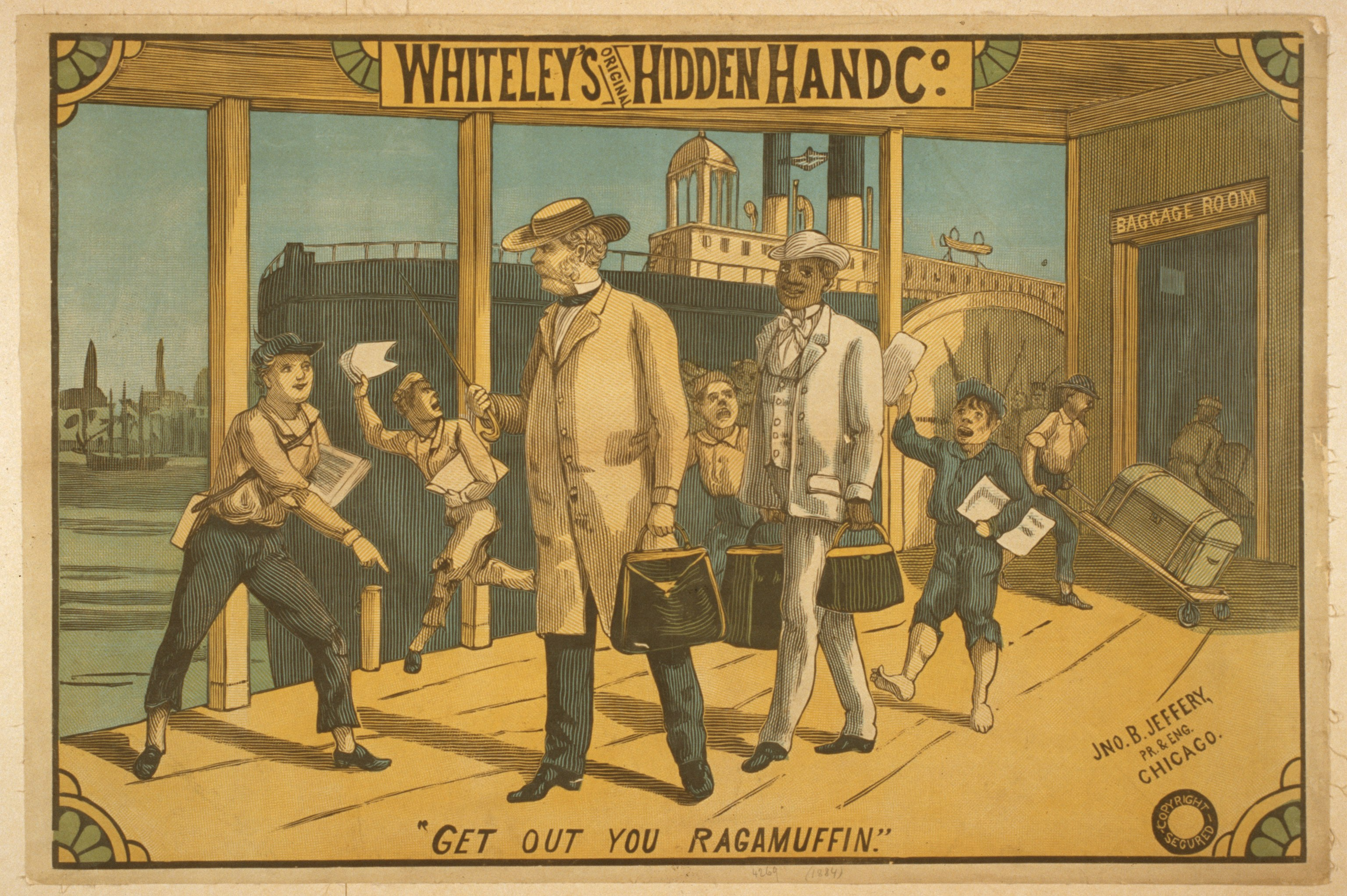
1884 poster for a stage production of The Hidden Hand

Capitola Black — The protagonist of the novel and an orphan whose origins are unknown. At the start of the novel, she is living on the streets of New York, working as a newsboy. The wealthy Major Warfield adopts her and brings her to his home, Hurricane Hall. By the conclusion of the novel, Capitola marries Herbert Greyson.

Major Ira Warfield — A war veteran, bachelor and owner of the Virginia plantation Hurricane Hall. He goes to New York in search of Capitola after learning about her from Nancy Grewell, the mulatta woman who delivered her and her stillborn brother many years ago. Warfield adopts Capitola and makes her "'the sole heiress of a fortune--in land, negroes, coal-mines, iron-foundries, railway shares and bank-stock, of a half a million dollars.'"

Colonel Le Noir — The antagonist of The Hidden Hand, plots to have his niece, Capitola, murdered by Black Donald to keep her from inheriting his fortune. We learn that Capitola was rescued from Le Noir as an infant.

Traverse Rocke — Student of Dr. Day and the intended husband of Clara Day. He is also the unacknowledged son of Major Warfield and his 'cast-off' wife, Marah Rocke. Traverse is part of a group of male characters who go off to fight in the Mexican–American War.

Clara Day — Daughter of Dr. Day who is orphaned by his untimely death and falls under the control of Colonel Le Noir. Clara is the love interest of Traverse Rocke and is rescued by Capitola. By the conclusion of the novel, Clara marries Traverse.

Craven Le Noir —The son of Colonel Le Noir. His father tries to force Clara Day to marry Craven.

Black Donald — A notorious bandit hired by Colonel Le Noir to murder Capitola. He is frequently outsmarted by Capitola and assumes several identities over the course of the novel.

Wool — A "minstrel-like" slave who lives at Hurricane Hall and faithfully serves Major Warfield.

Nancy (Granny) Grewell — is the mulatta midwife who shares her "last testament" with Major Warfield. She is also the woman who saves Capitola as an infant and takes her to New York at the request of Capitola's mother.
