= Seacliff, California =

Census-designated place in the United States

Seacliff
- census-designated place
- Position in California.
- Coordinates: 36°58′36″N 121°55′06″W
- Country: United States
- State: California
- County: Santa Cruz

Area
  - Total: 0.731 sq mi (1.893 km^{2})
  - Land: 0.730 sq mi (1.890 km^{2})
  - Water: 0.0012 sq mi (0.003 km^{2}) 0.17%
- Elevation: 144 ft (44 m)

Population (2020)
  - Total: 3,280
  - Density: 4,490/sq mi (1,740/km^{2})
- Time zone: UTC-8 (Pacific (PST))
  - Summer (DST): UTC-7 (PDT)
- GNIS feature IDs: 2583132, 1873075

Seacliff is an unincorporated community in Santa Cruz County, California, United States that includes Seacliff State Beach. It is identified as one of several small communities with a combined population of 24,402 forming the unincorporated town of Aptos by the local Chamber of Commerce along with:

- Aptos Village
- Aptos Hills-Larkin Valley, a rural area north of State Route 1
- Cabrillo
- Rio Del Mar, south of State Route 1, from Aptos Creek southeast to Seascape
- Seascape, south of State Route 1, centered on Seascape Beach Resort

For statistical purposes, the United States Census Bureau has defined Seacliff as a census-designated place (CDP). The census definition of the area may not precisely correspond to local understanding of the area with the same name. The 2020 United States census reported Seacliff's population was 3,280.

== Geography ==
According to the United States Census Bureau, the CDP covers an area of 0.7 square mile (1.9 km^{2}), of which 99.83% is land and 0.17% is water. Seacliff sits at a mean elevation of 144 feet (44 m).

== Demographics ==
Historical population
Census	Pop.	Note	%±
2010	3,267		—
2020	3,280		0.4%
U.S. Decennial Census; 2010

Seacliff first appeared as a census designated place in the 2010 U.S. census.

=== Racial and ethnic composition ===
Seacliff CDP, California – Racial and ethnic composition Note: the US Census treats Hispanic/Latino as an ethnic category. This table excludes Latinos from the racial categories and assigns them to a separate category. Hispanics/Latinos may be of any race.
Race / Ethnicity (NH = Non-Hispanic)	Pop 2010	Pop 2020	% 2010	% 2020
White alone (NH)	2,538	2,306	77.69%	70.30%
Black or African American alone (NH)	24	15	0.73%	0.46%
Native American or Alaska Native alone (NH)	23	19	0.70%	0.58%
Asian alone (NH)	89	96	2.72%	2.93%
Native Hawaiian or Pacific Islander alone (NH)	0	0	0.00%	0.00%
Other race alone (NH)	5	19	0.15%	0.58%
Mixed race or Multiracial (NH)	106	174	3.24%	5.30%
Hispanic or Latino (any race)	482	651	14.75%	19.85%
Total	3,267	3,280	100.00%	100.00%

=== 2020 census ===
As of the 2020 census, Seacliff had a population of 3,280. The population density was 4,493.2 inhabitants per square mile (1,734.8/km^{2}).

The census reported that 99.7% of the population lived in households, 0.3% lived in non-institutionalized group quarters, and no one was institutionalized. 100.0% of residents lived in urban areas, while 0.0% lived in rural areas.

There were 1,535 households, out of which 22.1% included children under the age of 18. Of all households, 39.8% were married-couple households, 7.6% were cohabiting couple households, 34.5% had a female householder with no spouse or partner present, and 18.2% had a male householder with no spouse or partner present. 33.9% of households were one person, and 14.1% were one person aged 65 or older. The average household size was 2.13. There were 884 families (57.6% of all households).

The age distribution was 16.0% under the age of 18, 6.8% aged 18 to 24, 24.5% aged 25 to 44, 30.2% aged 45 to 64, and 22.6% who were 65 years of age or older. The median age was 47.5 years. For every 100 females, there were 89.3 males, and for every 100 females age 18 and over, there were 83.9 males age 18 and over.

There were 1,938 housing units at an average density of 2,654.8 units per square mile (1,025.0 units/km^{2}), of which 1,535 (79.2%) were occupied. Of these, 53.9% were owner-occupied, and 46.1% were occupied by renters. 20.8% of housing units were vacant. The homeowner vacancy rate was 1.4%, and the rental vacancy rate was 5.0%.
