= Aptos Hills-Larkin Valley, California =

Aptos Hills-Larkin Valley
- census-designated place
- Location in Santa Cruz County and the state of California

- Location in the United States
- Coordinates: 36°57′39″N 121°49′53″W
- Country: United States
- State: California
- County: Santa Cruz

Area
  - Total: 9.29 sq mi (24.07 km^{2})
  - Land: 9.26 sq mi (23.98 km^{2})
  - Water: 0.035 sq mi (0.09 km^{2}) 0.36%

Population (2020)
  - Total: 2,383
  - Density: 257.3/sq mi (99.36/km^{2})
- Time zone: UTC-8 (PST)
  - Summer (DST): UTC-7 (PDT)
- ZIP codes: 95003, 95076
- Area code: 831
- FIPS code: 06-02382
- GNIS feature ID: 2407751

Aptos Hills-Larkin Valley is an unincorporated community in Santa Cruz County, California, United States. It is identified as one of several small communities with a combined population of 24,402, forming the unincorporated town of Aptos by the local Chamber of Commerce, along with:

- Aptos Village
- Cabrillo
- Seacliff, south of State Route 1, west of Aptos Creek
- Rio Del Mar, south of State Route 1, from Aptos Creek southeast to Seascape
- Seascape, south of State Route 1, centered on Seascape Beach Resort

For statistical purposes, the United States Census Bureau has defined Aptos Hills-Larkin Valley as a census-designated place (CDP). The census definition of the area may not precisely correspond to local understanding of the area with the same name. The population was 2,383 as of the 2020 United States census.

== Geography ==
Aptos Hills-Larkin Valley is located at 36°57′39″N 121°49′53″W (36.960860, -121.831386).

According to the United States Census Bureau, the CDP has a total area of 9.3 square miles (24 km^{2}), of which 9.2 square miles (24 km^{2}) is land and 0.03 square miles (0.078 km^{2}) (0.36%) is water.

== Demographics ==
Historical population
Census	Pop.	Note	%±
1990	2,205		—
2000	2,361		7.1%
2010	2,381		0.8%
2020	2,383		0.1%
U.S. Decennial Census; 1860–1870 1880-1890; 1900 1910 1920; 1930 1940 1950; 1960 1970 1980; 1990 2000 2010; 2020

Aptos Hills-Larkin Valley first appeared as a census-designated place in the 1990 United States census.

=== Racial and ethnic composition ===
Aptos Hills-Larkin Valley CDP, California – Racial and ethnic composition Note: the US Census treats Hispanic/Latino as an ethnic category. This table excludes Latinos from the racial categories and assigns them to a separate category. Hispanics/Latinos may be of any race.
Race / Ethnicity (NH = Non-Hispanic)	Pop 2000	Pop 2010	Pop 2020	% 2000	% 2010	% 2020
White alone (NH)	1,856	1,731	1,654	78.61%	72.70%	69.41%
Black or African American alone (NH)	15	4	17	0.64%	0.17%	0.71%
Native American or Alaska Native alone (NH)	5	4	12	0.21%	0.17%	0.50%
Asian alone (NH)	44	53	40	1.86%	2.23%	1.68%
Native Hawaiian or Pacific Islander alone (NH)	5	1	0	0.21%	0.04%	0.00%
Other race alone (NH)	3	4	13	0.13%	0.17%	0.55%
Mixed race or Multiracial (NH)	74	43	101	3.13%	1.81%	4.24%
Hispanic or Latino (any race)	359	541	546	15.21%	22.72%	22.91%
Total	2,361	2,381	2,383	100.00%	100.00%	100.00%

=== 2020 census ===
As of the 2020 census, Aptos Hills-Larkin Valley had a population of 2,383. The population density was 257.3 inhabitants per square mile (99.3/km^{2}).

The median age was 51.4 years. About 14.7% of residents were under the age of 18 and 26.9% were 65 years of age or older. For every 100 females, there were 94.8 males, and for every 100 females age 18 and over, there were 93.9 males age 18 and over. The census reported that 99.5% of the population lived in households, 0.5% lived in non-institutionalized group quarters, and no one was institutionalized.

There were 903 households, out of which 24.0% included children under the age of 18. Of all households, 54.2% were married-couple households, 6.9% were cohabiting couple households, 14.5% had a male householder with no spouse or partner present, and 24.5% had a female householder with no spouse or partner present. About 20.3% of all households were made up of individuals and 12.9% had someone living alone who was 65 years of age or older. The average household size was 2.63. There were 635 families (70.3% of all households).

There were 956 housing units at an average density of 103.2 units per square mile (39.8 units/km^{2}). Of the housing units, 5.5% were vacant. Of occupied units, 80.2% were owner-occupied and 19.8% were occupied by renters. The homeowner vacancy rate was 0.8% and the rental vacancy rate was 1.6%.

18.7% of residents lived in urban areas, while 81.3% lived in rural areas.

=== Income and poverty ===
In 2023, the US Census Bureau estimated that the median household income was $154,591, and the per capita income was $76,597. About 1.1% of families and 5.4% of the population were below the poverty line.

== Government ==
In the California State Legislature, Aptos Hills-Larkin Valley is in the 17th senatorial district, represented by Democrat John Laird, and in the 29th Assembly district, represented by Democrat Robert Rivas.

In the United States House of Representatives, Aptos Hills-Larkin Valley is in California's 19th congressional district, represented by Democrat Jimmy Panetta.

== See also ==
- San Francisco Bay Area
