= Soquel Demonstration State Forest =

Forest in California, US

- Location within California Location within the United States
- Location: Soquel, California, United States
- Coordinates: 37°4′50″N 121°54′21″W
- Area: 2,681 acres (1,085 ha)
- Max. elevation: 2,400 feet (730 m)
- Min. elevation: 450 feet (140 m)
- Established: 1990
- Governing body: California Department of Forestry and Fire Protection
- Website: https://www.fire.ca.gov/what-we-do/natural-resource-management/demonstration-state-forests/soquel-demonstration-state-forest

Soquel Demonstration State Forest (SDSF or SDF) is one of 14 CAL FIRE–operated Demonstration State Forests, which total 85,000 acres (34,000 ha).

SDSF has an area of 2,681 acres, and is located between Soquel-San Jose Road to the west, and Highland Way to the east. The main entrance to the forest is off Highland Way.

The forests represent the most common forest types in California. The State Forests grow approximately 75 million board feet yearly and harvest an average of 30 million board feet of timber each year. Revenue from these harvests funds a variety of the Department's Resource Management Programs. In addition, the forests provide research and demonstration projects on forest management, while providing public recreation opportunities, natural habitats, and watershed protection.

The Board of Forestry and Fire Protection (Board) policy provides that the State Forests shall be used for experimentation to determine the economic feasibility of artificial reforestation, and to demonstrate the productive and economic possibilities of good forest practices toward maintaining forest cropland in a productive condition. The management objectives and plans developed for each State Forest are subject to periodic review and approval by the Board.

== Location and description ==
Soquel Demonstration Forest is situated in the Santa Cruz Mountains along California's central coast. Originally part of a Mexican "augmentation" land grant added to Rancho Soquel in 1844, the property was logged by several different owners before the State took ownership in 1988. Today, the Forest allows the public to access the coastal redwoods and observe the wildlife that inhabits it.

Located along the east branch of Soquel Creek and including portions of Amaya Creek and Fern Gulch Creek, the forest contains Coastal Redwood, mixed hardwoods, and riparian ecosystems. Soquel is geologically active, with the San Andreas and Zayante Faults passing through the property. Associated with the forest's geologic activity are several natural springs and small marshes found in closed depressions, known as sag ponds.

Soquel is California's only state forest located near large urban areas. Its proximity to the metropolitan centers of the San Francisco and Monterey Bay Area makes it accessible to the public for use in forestry education and outdoor recreation.

== Mountain biking ==
The forest, also known as "Demo," is home to a series of mountain biking trails. Many of the singletrack trails course down ridges, largely on old logging road cuts, created when the forest was first logged in the 1930s. These routes were adopted as part of the recreational trail network when Cal Fire acquired the property in the early 1990s. Additional singletrack trails were established through Cal Fire's collaborations with local mountain biking clubs in 2000 (Braille Trail) and 2015 (Flow Trail). The trails have grown into some of the most popular in the California Bay Area and attract bikers from around the world.

The trail network undergoes changes over time as Cal Fire conducts timber harvests in different areas of the forest. The old logging cuts, along with the trails on them, are evaluated for their long-term impact on the watershed. Steep sections are modified to limit erosion through measures including obliteration and recontouring, installation of drainage structures, or application of a top coat of hard crushed rock. Singletrack trails are often realigned to help improve the recreational experience while simultaneously protecting the watershed from excessive sediment delivery into the creek.
