= Rancho Soquel =

19th-century Mexican land grant

Coordinates: 36.990°N 121.940°W

U.S. Surveyor General's 1859 map of the augmented 32,702-acre land grant

U.S. Surveyor General's 1859 map of the original 1668-acre land grant

Rancho Soquel was a 1,668-acre (6.75 km^{2}) Mexican land grant in present-day Santa Cruz County, California given in 1833 by Governor José Figueroa to María Martina Castro y Amador. In 1844, Martina Castro was granted by Governor José Figueroa a further 32,702-acre (132.34 km^{2}) grant known as the Soquel Augmentation. The Rancho Soquel grant along Monterey Bay includes present-day Soquel and Capitola. Rancho Aptos of her brother Rafael Castro formed the south boundary of the grant. The much-larger Soquel Augmentation grant lay inland from both of these, and comprised mainly mountain watershed land.

== History ==
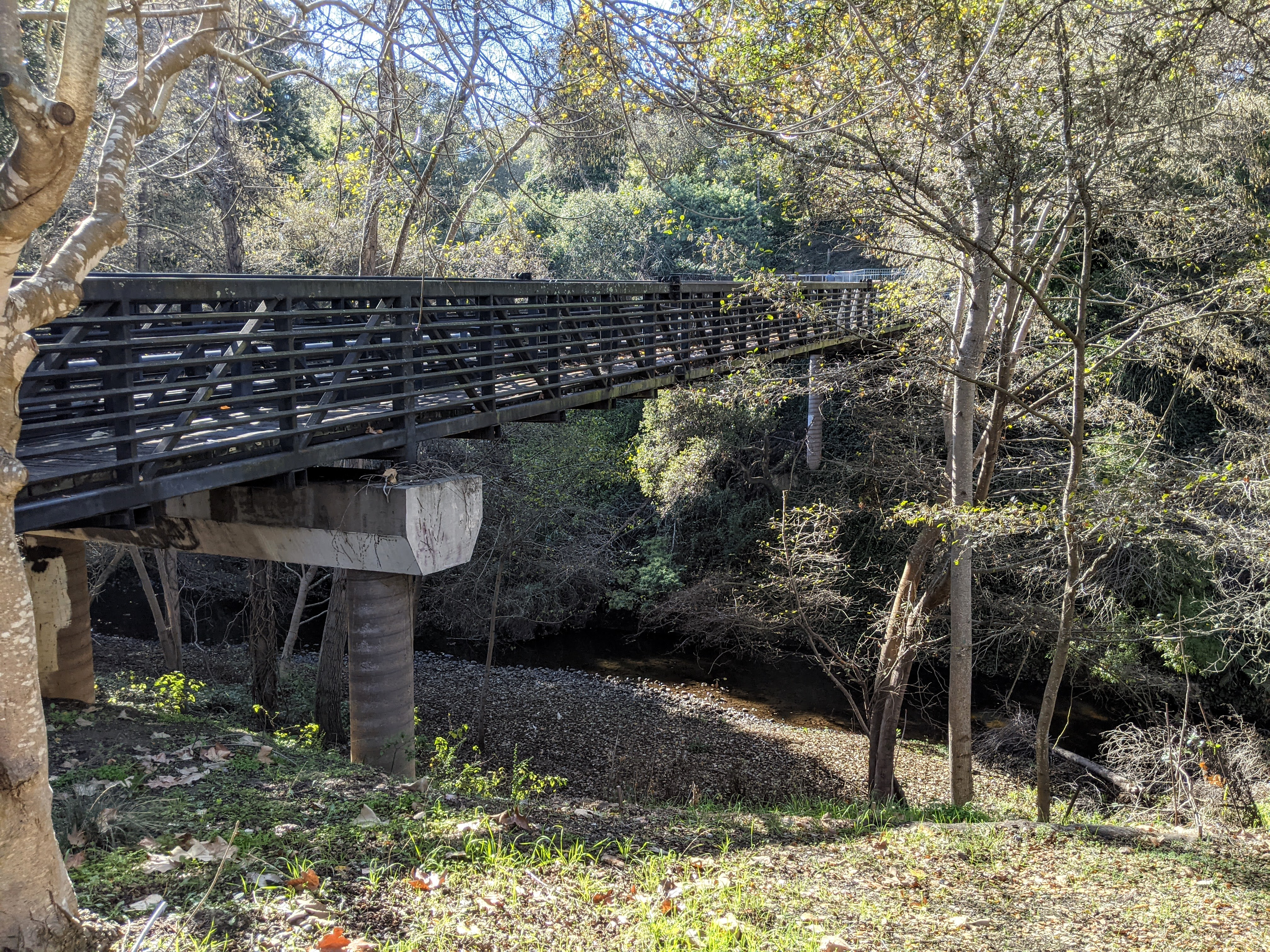
Bridge across Soquel Creek at Peery Park, looking west from the rancho

María Martina Castro y Amador (1807–1890), was born in Villa de Branciforte, daughter of José Joaquín Castro (1768–1838), grantee of Rancho San Andrés. Martina married Simon Cota, a soldier stationed at Monterey, in 1824. When Simon died six years later, in 1830, Martina became a widow with four children. Martina married Irishman Michael Lodge (1797–1849) in 1831, and she was granted the half square league Rancho Soquel in 1833.

With Lodge's encouragement, Martina applied for a much larger 32,000 acres (129 km^{2}) grant of forested mountain land, inland from the earlier Soquel and Aptos grants. The huge area included the eastern side of the Soquel Creek watershed, most of the Aptos Creek watershed, Trout Gulch and much of Valencia Creek. The grant was approved in 1844 by governor Manuel Micheltorena. Lodge recognized the value of timber resources on the new lands, and contracted John Hames and John Daubenbiss to build a sawmill. Parts of the grant are now The Forest of Nisene Marks State Park, and the Soquel Demonstration State Forest.

In 1848, Michael Lodge and Martina joined the California Gold Rush. Martina returned after three of her children died, but Lodge never returned and was presumed murdered. In 1849, Martina, at 42, married Louis Depeaux, a man 16 years younger than she was. Soon afterward, Depeaux left. A daughter, Carmelita (Carmel) Castro Lodge (1827–1923) married Thomas Fallon in 1849.

With the cession of California to the United States following the Mexican-American War, the 1848 Treaty of Guadalupe Hidalgo provided that the land grants would be honored. As required by the Land Act of 1851, a claim was filed for the Soquel grant with the Public Land Commission in 1852, and the grant was patented to Martina Castro in 1860. A claim for the Soquel Augmentation grant was filed with the Land Commission in 1853, and the grant was patented to Martina Castro in 1860.

In Depeaux's absence, Martina gave each of her remaining eight children an undivided one-ninth of the Rancho Soquel grant. In 1856, with the onset of mental instability, Martina sold her remaining land and spent her last years with her daughter Guadalupe in Capitola until her death in 1890. Much of the rancho land was sold to Frederick A. Hihn in the 1860s, including much of the redwood forest area and the beach-side area that became Capitola.

The Loma Prieta Lumber Company bought 6,485 acres from Carmel Fallon, a daughter of Martina Castro, in 1883. The lumber company operated on the property until 1923. The Marks family began acquiring property in the area in the 1950s, including much of the former lumber company land. They donated their entire 9,700-acres to the State of California in 1963, on condition that it be named for their mother Nisene. The former Marks property is now the largest part of The Forest of Nisene Marks State Park.
