= List of California state forests =

Since 1946, the California Department of Forestry and Fire Protection (CAL FIRE) has operated Demonstration State Forests to "serve as a living laboratory for how to care for California’s timberlands."

State Forest	Land area	County	City	Established	Access	Ref
Big Bend	6,982 acres (28.26 km^{2})	Shasta		2022		
Boggs Mountain	3,493 acres (14.14 km^{2})	Lake	Cobb	1949	S	
Ellen Pickett	160 acres (0.65 km^{2})	Trinity			X	
Emigrant Gap	2,618 acres (10.59 km^{2})	Trinity/Placer				
Jackson	48,652 acres (196.89 km^{2})	Mendocino	Fort Bragg	1947	S	
Las Posadas	796 acres (3.22 km^{2})	Napa	Angwin		X	
LaTour	9,033 acres (36.56 km^{2})	Shasta	Redding	1946	S	
Miller	2,246 acres (9.09 km^{2})	Shasta		2022		
Mount Zion	164 acres (0.66 km^{2})	Amador		1981		
Mountain Home	4,807 acres (19.45 km^{2})	Tulare	Springville	1946	S	
Noble	2,050 acres (8.3 km^{2})	Shasta	Shingletown	2022		
North Fork Mokelumne	1,052 acres (4.26 km^{2})	Amador				
Sawmill	120 acres (0.49 km^{2})	San Bernardino		2022		
Soquel	2,681 acres (10.85 km^{2})	Santa Cruz	Soquel	1988	S	

Access: Forests have limited access with no amenities unless noted with S (permanently staffed with public amenities) or X (not open to the public).

== See also ==
- List of national forests of the United States
  - Category:National forests of California
