= Aptos, California =

Census designated place in California, United States

- Unincorporated community Census designated place
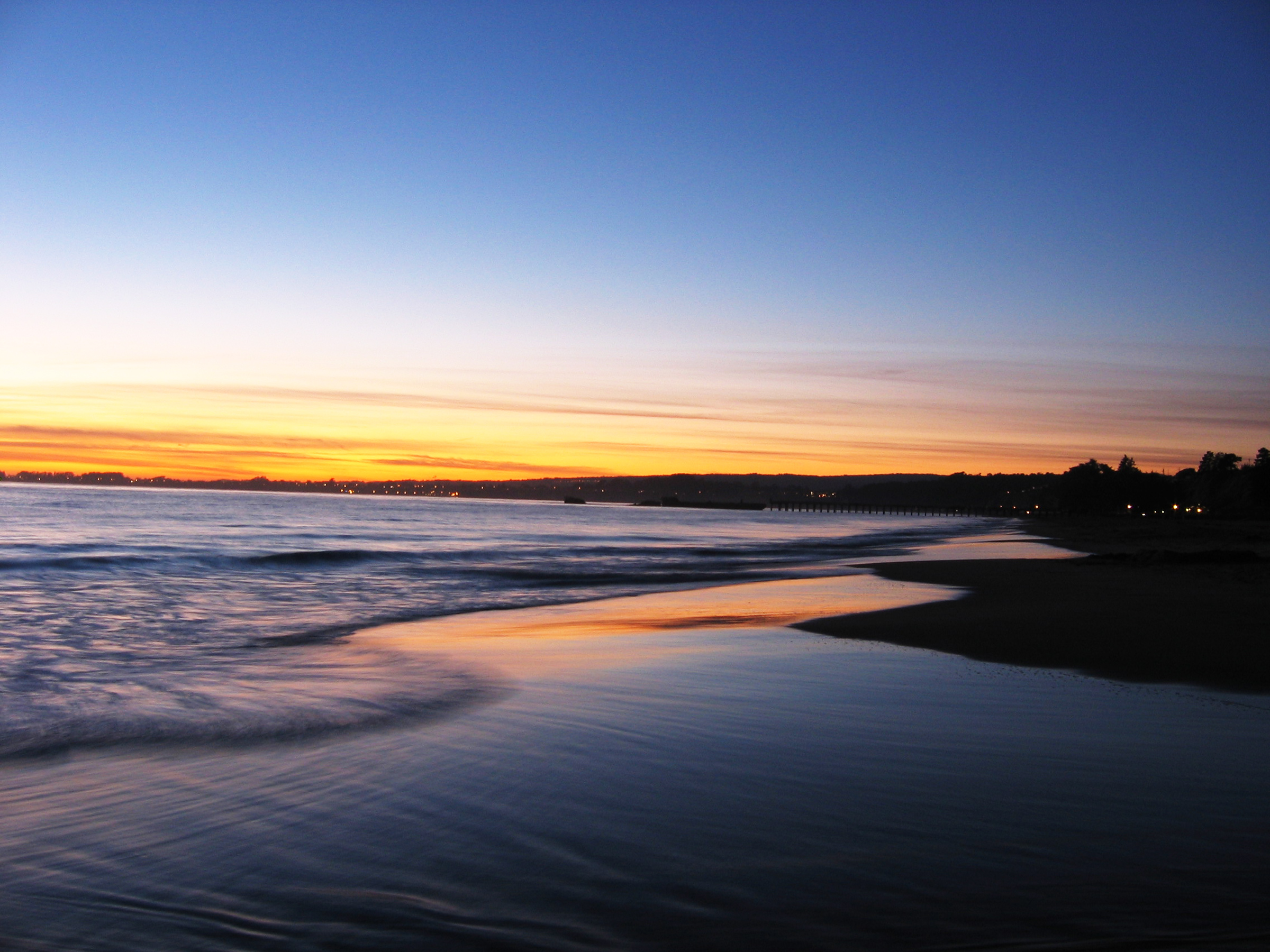
- Sunset at Seacliff State Beach in Aptos

- Location in Santa Cruz County and its location in the state of California

- Location in the United States
- Coordinates: 36°58′53″N 121°54′27″W
- Country: United States
- State: California
- County: Santa Cruz
- Rancho Aptos: 1833

Area
  - CDP: 6.58 sq mi (17.04 km^{2})
  - Land: 6.58 sq mi (17.04 km^{2})
  - Water: 0 sq mi (0.00 km^{2}) 0%
- Elevation: 108 ft (33 m)

Population (2020)
  - CDP: 6,664
  - Density: 1,013.1/sq mi (391.15/km^{2})
  - Urban: 21,000
- Time zone: UTC−8 (Pacific)
  - Summer (DST): UTC−7 (PDT)
- ZIP codes: 95001, 95003
- Area code: 831
- FIPS code: 06-02378
- GNIS feature IDs: 1657939, 2407750

Aptos (Ohlone for "The People" or "Meeting of Two Streams") is an unincorporated community in Santa Cruz County, California, United States. The town is made up of several small villages, which together form Aptos: Aptos Hills-Larkin Valley, Aptos Village, Cabrillo, Seacliff, Rio del Mar, and Seascape. As of the 2020 census, Aptos had a population of 6,664.

== History ==
Aptos was traditionally inhabited by the Awaswas tribe of Ohlone people. The name is one of only three native words that have survived (in Hispanicized form) as place names in Santa Cruz County (the others are Soquel and Zayante). In the Awaswas Ohlone language, Aptos may mean "the people" according to Gudde and Bright (2004) or "meeting of two streams" according to Golla (2011).

The first European land exploration of Alta California, the Spanish Portolá expedition, passed through the area on its way north, camping at one of the creeks on October 16, 1769. The expedition diaries don't provide enough information to be sure which creek it was, but the direction of travel was northwest, parallel to the coast. Franciscan missionary Juan Crespi, traveling with the expedition, noted in his diary that, "We stopped on the bank of a small stream, which has about four varas of deep running water. It has on its banks a good growth of cottonwoods and alders; on account of the depth at which it runs it may be that it cannot be utilized to water some plains through which it runs." Crespi diary translator Herbert Bolton speculated that the location was Soquel Creek, but it could have been Aptos Creek.

In 1833 the government of Mexico granted Rafael Castro the 6,656-acre (26.94 km^{2}) Rancho Aptos. Initially Castro raised cattle for their hides, but after California became a state in 1850, Castro leased his land to Americans who built a wharf, general store, and lumber mill. The original town was located where Aptos Village Square is now. In 1853 a leather tannery was built, and the main building is a bed & breakfast inn.

In 1875, Frederick A. Hihn and Claus Spreckels partnered to build the Santa Cruz Railroad, and routed it through Aptos where they both had development interests - Hihn with the Loma Prieta Lumber Company, and Spreckels with his Aptos Hotel resort. The railroad tracks ran directly adjacent to the Santa Cruz Watsonville road, whose route was originally established by the 1769 Spanish exploratory expedition led by Gaspar de Portolá.

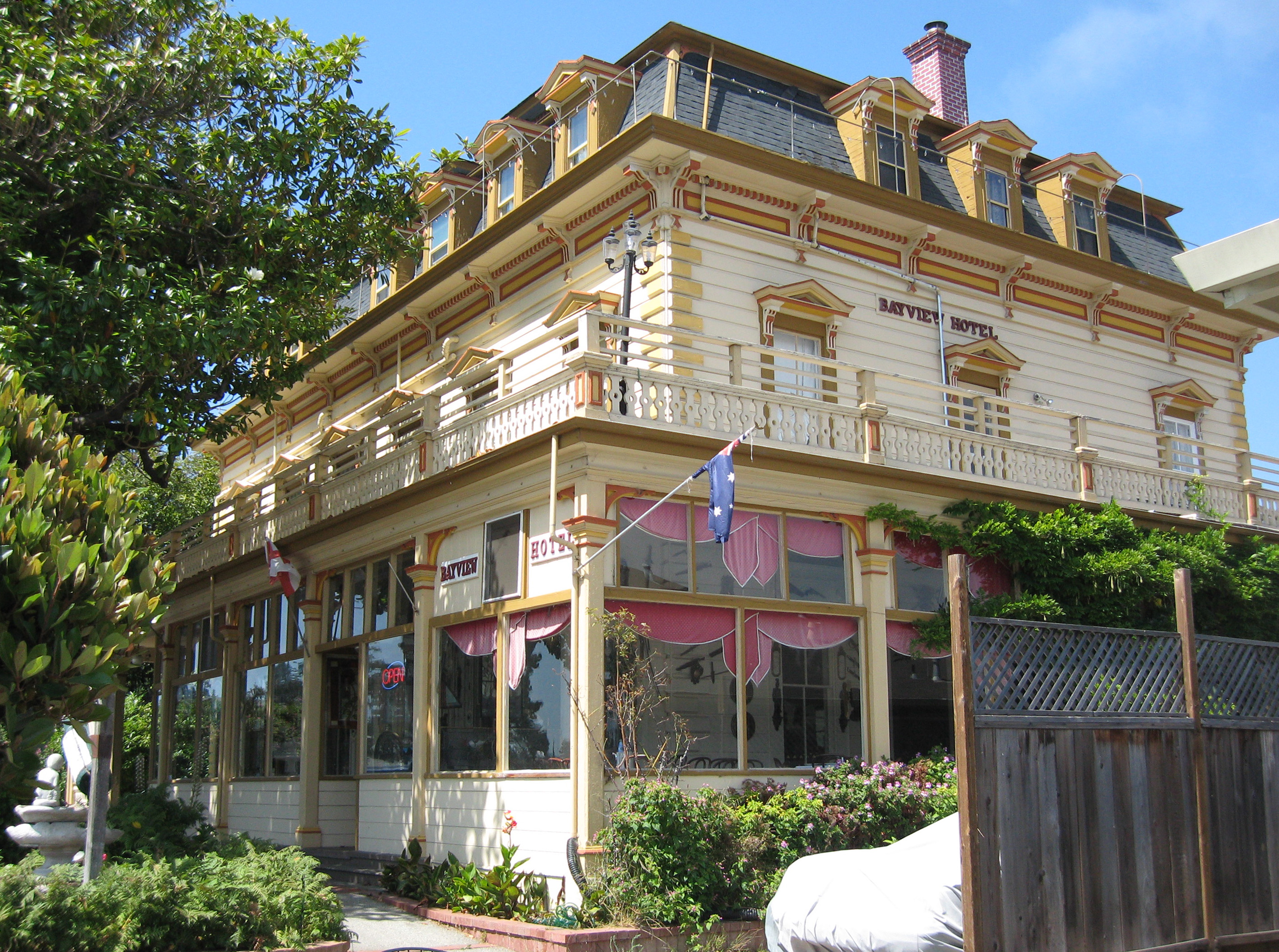
Bayview Hotel in Aptos

In 1878 Augustia Castro, daughter of Rafael Castro, and her husband José Arano built the Victorian, Bayview Hotel in Aptos village. The hotel is a Santa Cruz County landmark. It is Santa Cruz county's oldest operating hotel. It has been a State Historic Monument since 1974 and listed on the National Register of Historic Places since 1993. Since being originally built, the hotel was moved to its current location.

In the mid to late 1800s, a series of major epidemics hit the area. A particularly bad one occurred in the early winter of 1868. Cases of smallpox were reported among the poor of San Juan Bautista. Efforts were made to localize the rapidly spreading disease, such as, barricading the roads leading in and out of San Juan Bautista. These efforts failed however, and when cases appeared in Watsonville, Santa Cruz citizens attempted to again quarantine the disease by destroying the Aptos Bridge. These efforts again failed and only created a rift between the two cities. The death toll of the smallpox epidemic lead to the local press publishing of the latest remedies available for home use as well as methods to prevent the spread of smallpox and inoculations.

By 1872, Claus Spreckels, a sugar millionaire, began buying the land from Castro. He built a hotel near the beach and a summer mansion and ranch with a racetrack for his horses. A large area was fenced and stocked with deer for hunting, and became known as "the Deer Park," home of today's Deer Park Center.

From 1880 to 1920 redwood timber harvesting became the major industry, and Aptos became a boom town. The Loma Prieta Lumber Company logged all of what is now The Forest of Nisene Marks State Park. The Valencia Mill logged everything to the east. Within 40 years the hills were bare, and apples became the next industry. The Hihn Apple Barn is a historic building from that era; in 2016–2017, the building had been relocated nearby to be used as a grocery store and make way for a shopping complex.

On March 16–20, 1905, the Leonard Ranch near La Selva was the site of experiments with a new tandem-wing glider designed and built by John J. Montgomery. Hoisted aloft by hot-air balloon to considerable heights, over a series of test flights pilot Daniel J. Maloney was able to demonstrate the control and flight of the Montgomery glider design. These flights, with starting altitudes over 3,000 feet above the ground, were the first high-altitude flights in the world. A marker was placed at this location in 2005 honoring the centennial of these accomplishments.

After Spreckels' death, Seacliff Park and Rio Del Mar Country Club (today's Seacliff State Beach) were developed in the late 1920s. Rio Del Mar Country Club included a clubhouse, a grand hotel on the bluffs, a beach club, a polo field, and a golf course. The estuary was filled in (now Rio Beach Flats) and the SS Palo Alto cement ship was moored and converted into an amusement pier with restaurants, swimming pool, and a dance pavilion. Both Rio Del Mar and Seacliff were popular during Prohibition as drinking and gambling were discreetly available. These amusements were interrupted by the Great Depression and World War II.

In the early 1960s Aptos began a period of rapid development, including Cabrillo College, Rancho Del Mar Shopping Center, the Seascape Resort development, and many residential developments.

In 2023, Microsoft named a new Windows font after this community.

== Geography ==
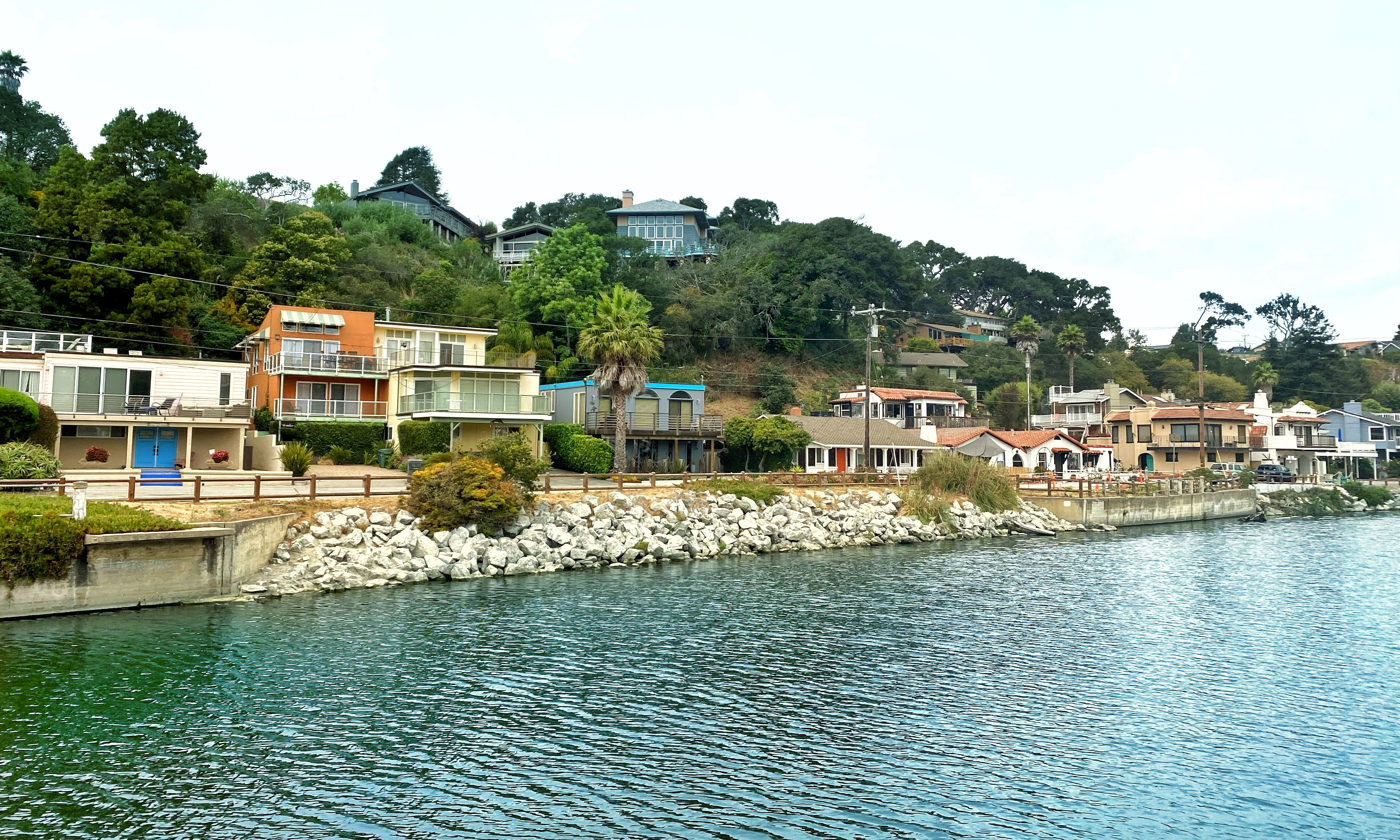
Rio del Mar, California, and Aptos Creek

For statistical purposes, the United States Census Bureau has defined Aptos as a census-designated place (CDP). The census definition of the area is limited in contrast to the local understanding of the area with the same name. The population of the CDP was 6,664 at the 2020 census. The CDP has a total area of 6.6 square miles (17 km^{2}), all land. The southwestern geographical boundary is Monterey Bay, while the northeast boundary is the Santa Cruz Mountains.

Aptos is bisected northwest-to-southeast by the State Route 1 freeway and includes the ZIP codes 95001 and 95003.

== Demographics ==
Historical population
| Census | Pop. | Note | %± |
|---|---|---|---|
| 1970 | 8,704 | | — |
| 1980 | 7,039 | | −19.1% |
| 1990 | 9,061 | | 28.7% |
| 2000 | 9,396 | | 3.7% |
| 2010 | 6,220 | | −33.8% |
| 2020 | 6,664 | | 7.1% |
U.S. Decennial Census; 1860–1870 1880-1890; 1900 1910 1920; 1930 1940 1950; 1960 1970 1980; 1990 2000 2010; 2020

Aptos first appeared as an unincorporated community in the 1970 U.S. census; and as a census-designated place in the 1980 United States census.

=== Racial and ethnic composition ===
Aptos CDP, California – Racial and ethnic composition Note: the US Census treats Hispanic/Latino as an ethnic category. This table excludes Latinos from the racial categories and assigns them to a separate category. Hispanics/Latinos may be of any race.
| Race / Ethnicity (NH = Non-Hispanic) | Pop 2000 | Pop 2010 | Pop 2020 | % 2000 | % 2010 | % 2020 |
|---|---|---|---|---|---|---|
| White alone (NH) | 8,147 | 5,082 | 4,808 | 86.71% | 81.70% | 72.15% |
| Black or African American alone (NH) | 52 | 54 | 60 | 0.55% | 0.87% | 0.90% |
| Native American or Alaska Native alone (NH) | 44 | 17 | 39 | 0.47% | 0.27% | 0.59% |
| Asian alone (NH) | 217 | 239 | 260 | 2.31% | 3.84% | 3.90% |
| Native Hawaiian or Pacific Islander alone (NH) | 10 | 8 | 18 | 0.11% | 0.13% | 0.27% |
| Other race alone (NH) | 23 | 12 | 49 | 0.24% | 0.19% | 0.74% |
| Mixed race or Multiracial (NH) | 248 | 197 | 367 | 2.64% | 3.17% | 5.51% |
| Hispanic or Latino (any race) | 655 | 611 | 1,063 | 6.97% | 9.82% | 15.95% |
| Total | 9,396 | 6,220 | 6,664 | 100.00% | 100.00% | 100.00% |

=== 2020 census ===
As of the 2020 census, Aptos had a population of 6,664 and a population density of 1,013.1 inhabitants per square mile (391.2/km^{2}). The age distribution was 17.5% under the age of 18, 6.9% aged 18 to 24, 20.7% aged 25 to 44, 28.9% aged 45 to 64, and 25.9% who were 65 years of age or older. The median age was 48.9 years. For every 100 females, there were 95.7 males, and for every 100 females age 18 and over, there were 94.8 males age 18 and over.

The census reported that 98.7% of the population lived in households, 1.3% lived in non-institutionalized group quarters, and no one was institutionalized. Aptos was 100.0% urban and 0.0% rural.

There were 2,675 households in Aptos, of which 25.7% had children under the age of 18 living in them. Of all households, 52.4% were married-couple households, 6.1% were cohabiting couple households, 16.3% were households with a male householder and no spouse or partner present, and 25.2% were households with a female householder and no spouse or partner present. About 25.1% of all households were made up of individuals and 15.4% had someone living alone who was 65 years of age or older. The average household size was 2.46. There were 1,781 families (66.6% of all households).

There were 2,847 housing units at an average density of 432.8 units per square mile (167.1 units/km^{2}), of which 2,675 (94.0%) were occupied. Of occupied units, 76.5% were owner-occupied, and 23.5% were occupied by renters. The homeowner vacancy rate was 0.9%, and the rental vacancy rate was 2.9%.

=== Demographic estimates ===
In 2023, the US Census Bureau estimated that of the population aged 25 or older, 98.3% were high school graduates and 54.3% had a bachelor's degree. The median household income was $135,349, and the per capita income was $71,896. About 0.9% of families and 4.0% of the population were below the poverty line.

== Government ==
In the California State Legislature, Aptos is in the 17th senatorial district, represented by Democrat John Laird, and in the 30th Assembly district, represented by Democrat Dawn Addis.

In the United States House of Representatives, Aptos is in California's 19th congressional district, represented by Democrat Jimmy Panetta.

== Parks and recreation ==
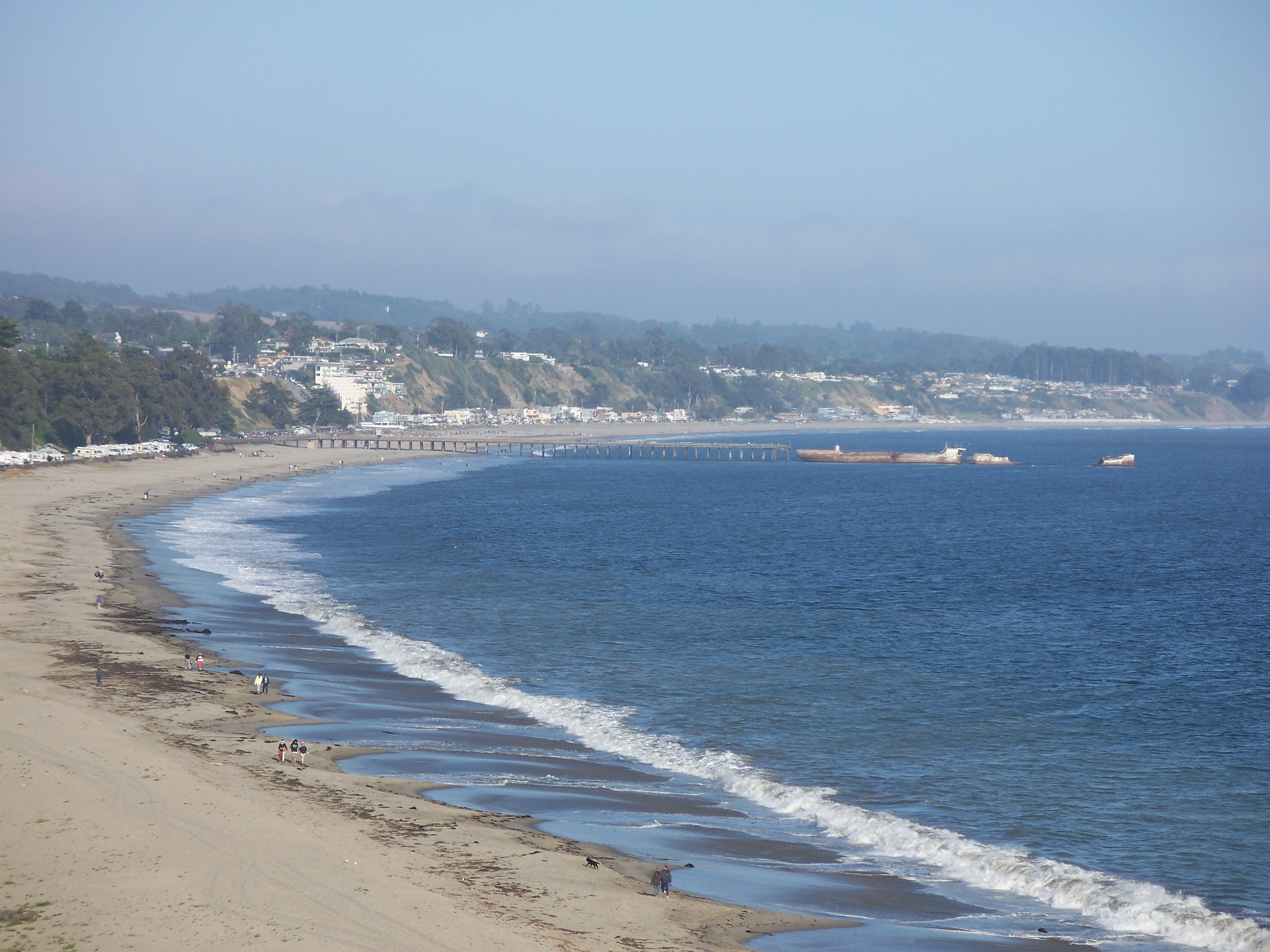
Seacliff State Beach and S.S. Palo Alto

Aptos is home to both the Forest of Nisene Marks State Park and Seacliff State Beach California state parks. Hidden Beach has a playground and a path that leads to the ocean. Nisene Marks is popular with hikers and mountain bikers. The San Andreas Fault Zone passes nearby and the epicenter of the M6.9 1989 Loma Prieta earthquake lies within.

Aptos is also home to the annual Fourth of July "World's Shortest Parade," so called because the parade route is about 0.6 miles (1 km) long.

Aptos Park is the site of the annual Aptos Blues Festival. Several well-known performers have performed at the festival, including B.B. King, Buddy Guy, John Lee Hooker, Ray Charles, Leon Russell, Los Lobos, Gregg Allman, the Doobie Brothers, Bonnie Raitt, and Al Green.

== Education ==
Cabrillo College is a two-year community college in Aptos.

Aptos has three public elementary schools: Valencia Elementary, Rio Del Mar Elementary, and Mar Vista Elementary. It also has one junior high school, Aptos Junior High School, and one high school, Aptos High School. Private schools include Santa Cruz Montessori School, Orchard School, and Twin Lakes Christian School. Aptos Academy, a pre-school through eighth grade private school, closed in 2013.

== Sports ==
The Aptos Little League baseball team made it to the Little League World Series in 2002, and was the subject of a documentary film on PBS, Small Ball: A Little League Story. From 1988 to 2019, the Nordic Naturals Challenger event was held in the Seascape Sports Club in Aptos.

== Notable people ==
- Terry Childs, serial killer convicted of five murders and sentenced to life without parole
- Frank Drake - SETI Founder, prominent Astronomer, Drake Equation.
- Peter Mel, Professional Surfer, attended Aptos High School, class of 1987
- Trent Dilfer, National Football League quarterback, attended Aptos High School, class of 1990
- Nikki Hiltz, professional Runner, attended Aptos Middle School
- Dave Draper, body builder, actor, motivational speaker, and author
- Mark Eichhorn, Major League Baseball pitcher
- Luke Keaschall, Major League Baseball player
- Randy Kramer, Major League Baseball pitcher, scout for the Toronto Blue Jays
- Lou Harrison, composer
- Daniel Henry Holmes Ingalls, Jr., computer scientist
- Harry Hooper, Major League Baseball player and member of the Hall of Fame, lived in Capitola, California and is buried in Aptos. Harry Hooper was one of two players traded by the Boston Red Sox, along with Babe Ruth, that created the Curse of the Bambino.
- Edmund Kemper, also known as the Co-ed Butcher or the Co-ed Killer, an American serial killer, necrophile, and cannibal
- Marisa Miller, model
- Bill Miller, Major League Baseball umpire
- John J. Montgomery, aviation pioneer
- Thomas Pynchon, author
- George Windle Read, Jr., United States Army Lieutenant General

== See also ==
- Seascape Beach Resort
- Aptos (typeface)
