= Rancho Aptos =

Mexican land grant in California

Coordinates: 36.990°N 121.890°W

U.S. Surveyor General's 1859 map of the 6686-acre land grant

Rancho Aptos was a 6,686-acre (27.06 km^{2}) Mexican land grant in present day Santa Cruz County, California given in 1833 by Governor José Figueroa to Rafael Castro. The grant on the Monterey Bay was immediately downcoast of his sister, Martina Castro's Rancho Soquel, and upcoast of his father, José Joaquín Castro's Rancho San Andrés. Rancho Aptos stretched from the area just to the west of Aptos Creek to parts of Nisene Marks and Day Valley in the north, and Rio del Mar to the east, including present day Aptos.

== History ==
Rafael de Jesus Castro (1803–1878), son of José Joaquín Castro and Maria Antonia Amador, received the one and one half square league grant in 1833. Rafael Castro served in various minor official posts. He and his wife, Soledad Cota (1808–1889), were primarily cattle-ranchers. Rafael Castro built a wharf, five hundred feet long, to ship hides, flour, and lumber during the 1850s.

With the cession of California to the United States following the Mexican-American War, the 1848 Treaty of Guadalupe Hidalgo provided that the land grants would be honored. As required by the Land Act of 1851, a claim for Rancho Aptos was filed with the Public Land Commission in 1853, and the grant was patented to Rafael Castro in 1860 (patent No. 216).

In 1867, Castro leased the wharf to Titus Hale, who extended it five hundred more feet into the sea. In the early 1870s, divorce actions were initiated by Soledad Castro. By 1872, Claus Spreckels, the sugar millionaire, began buying the land from Castro.
