= Anna Jean Cummings Park =

Park in California, United States

- Interactive map of Anna Jean Cummings Park
- Location: 461 Old San Jose Road, Soquel, California
- Nearest city: Soquel, California
- Coordinates: 36°59′41″N 121°57′34″W
- Area: 95 acres (38 ha)
- Created: 2001
- Operator: Santa Cruz County Parks Department

Anna Jean Cummings Park is a 95 acres (38 ha) park located in unincorporated Santa Cruz County, at 461 Old San Jose Road, Soquel, California, that opened in the summer of 2001 on the former O'Neill Ranch. Its nickname is "Blue Ball Park" for the art installation of "Skyballs" by Steve Gillman and Katherine Keefer, a series of four sky-blue 8-foot diameter spheres that appear to roll down the coastal prairie terrace.

The lower bench has a lawn, picnic pavilion, playground, and restrooms. The upper bench has natural turf baseball/softball diamonds and soccer fields, more restrooms, and a walking/jogging path that circumnavigates the playfields.

The rest of the park is rare coastal prairie, grassland, and riparian habitat with a meandering trail network. Rare and endangered species have been observed in the park, according to the February 1995 O'Neill Ranch Master Plan Draft Environmental Impact Report.

The park is named after Anna Jean Cummings, a former executive director of the Land Trust of Santa Cruz County.
