= Castro Adobe =

Historic house in California, United States

- Jose Joaquin Castro Adobe
- U.S. National Register of Historic Places
- California Historical Landmark
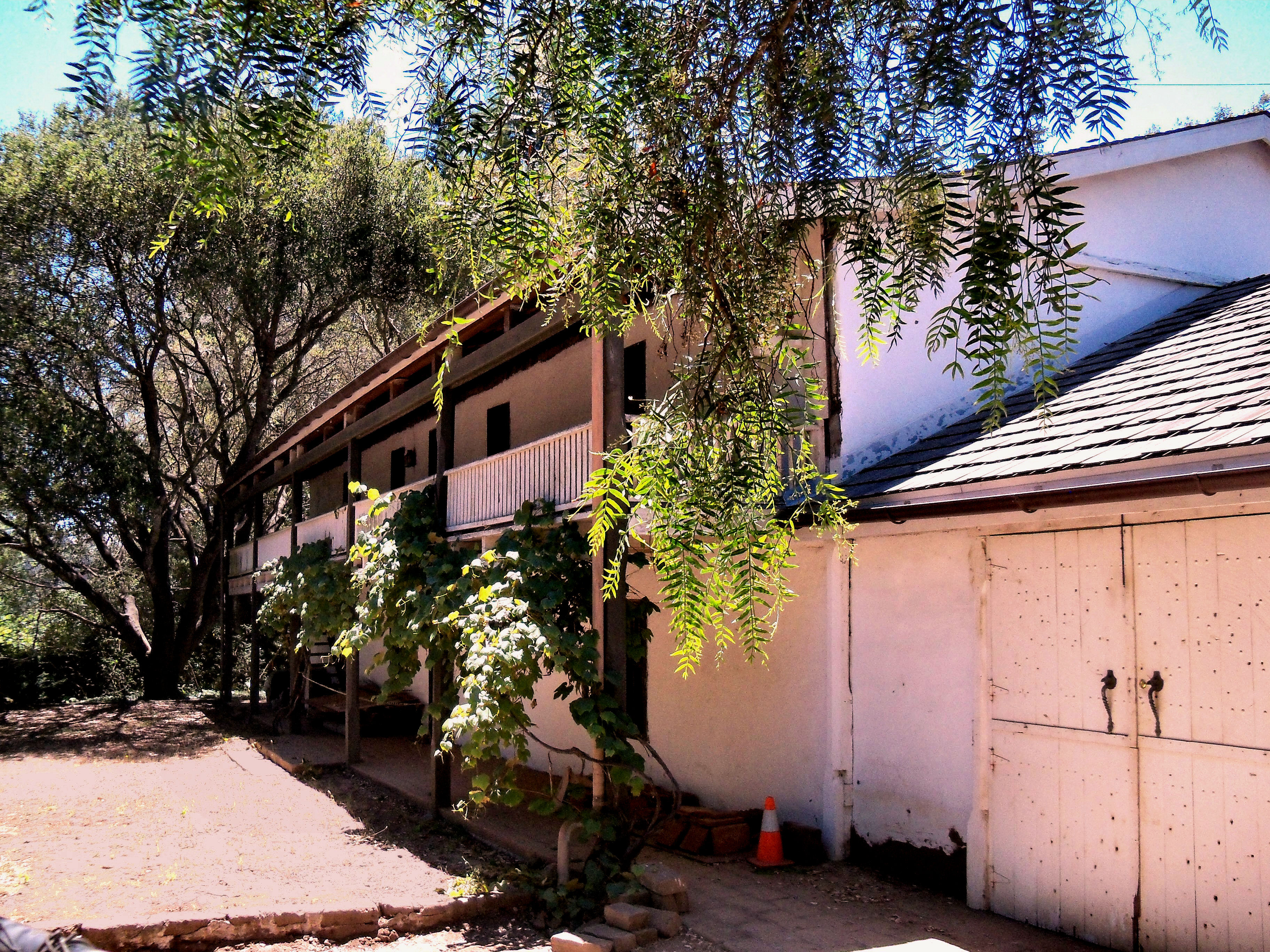

- Location within California Location within the United States
- Nearest city: Watsonville, California
- Coordinates: 36°56′46″N 121°48′40″W
- Area: less than one acre
- Built: 1848–1849
- Architect: José Joaquín Castro
- Architectural style: Monterey Colonial
- NRHP reference No.: 76000531
- CHISL No.: 998
- Added to NRHP: December 12, 1976

The Rancho San Andrés Castro Adobe is a historically and architecturally significant house located in the Pájaro Valley, California. The two-story Rancho San Andrés Castro Adobe is a historic rancho hacienda that was built between 1848 and 1849.

== History ==
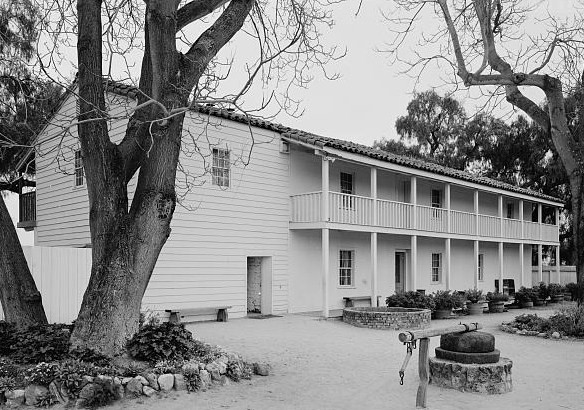
Photograph from the 1930s of the Historic American Buildings Survey (photographer unknown).

The house was built in 1848–1849 by Juan José Castro. His father Jose Joaquin Castro (1768–1838), came to California as a 6-year-old with his family from Sinaloa Mexico on the 1775–1776 Anza Expedition. Jose Joaquín Castro received this Mexican land grant Rancho San Andrés in the area of present-day Watsonville, California. It had the first dance floor (fandango room) in Santa Cruz County, California, and one of the first indoor kitchens (cocina). It is the only two-story hacienda ever built in Santa Cruz County.

The house was added to the National Register of Historic Places listings in Santa Cruz County, California on December 12, 1976. It is California Historical Landmark number 998. The adobe was severely damaged in the 1989 Loma Prieta earthquake. One wall had completely collapsed, and the house needed seismic retrofitting before being safe for the public. Owner Edna Kimbro sold it to the state of California in 2002. Starting in August 2007, Friends of California State Parks volunteers and the California Conservation Corps began restoration by making 2,500 adobe bricks. Almost 100 members of the Castro family held a reunion at the site in 2008.

The Rancho San Andrés Castro Adobe Park Property is currently (2024) open to the public only by appointment, special event, or free scheduled open house tour. Tour registration is via the website.

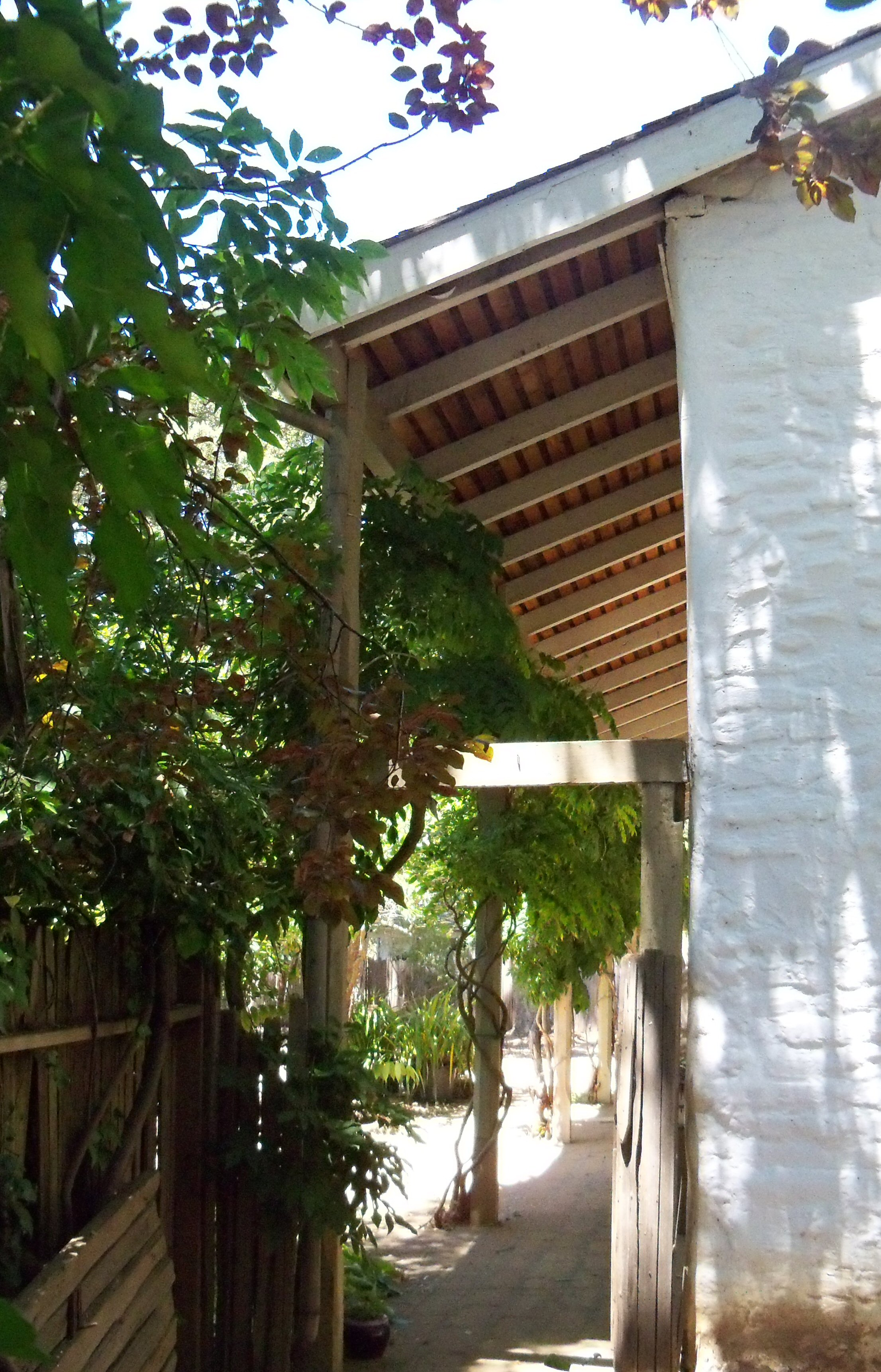
The Castro Adobe in 2012.
