= Seascape Beach Resort =

Resort and timeshare in Aptos, California

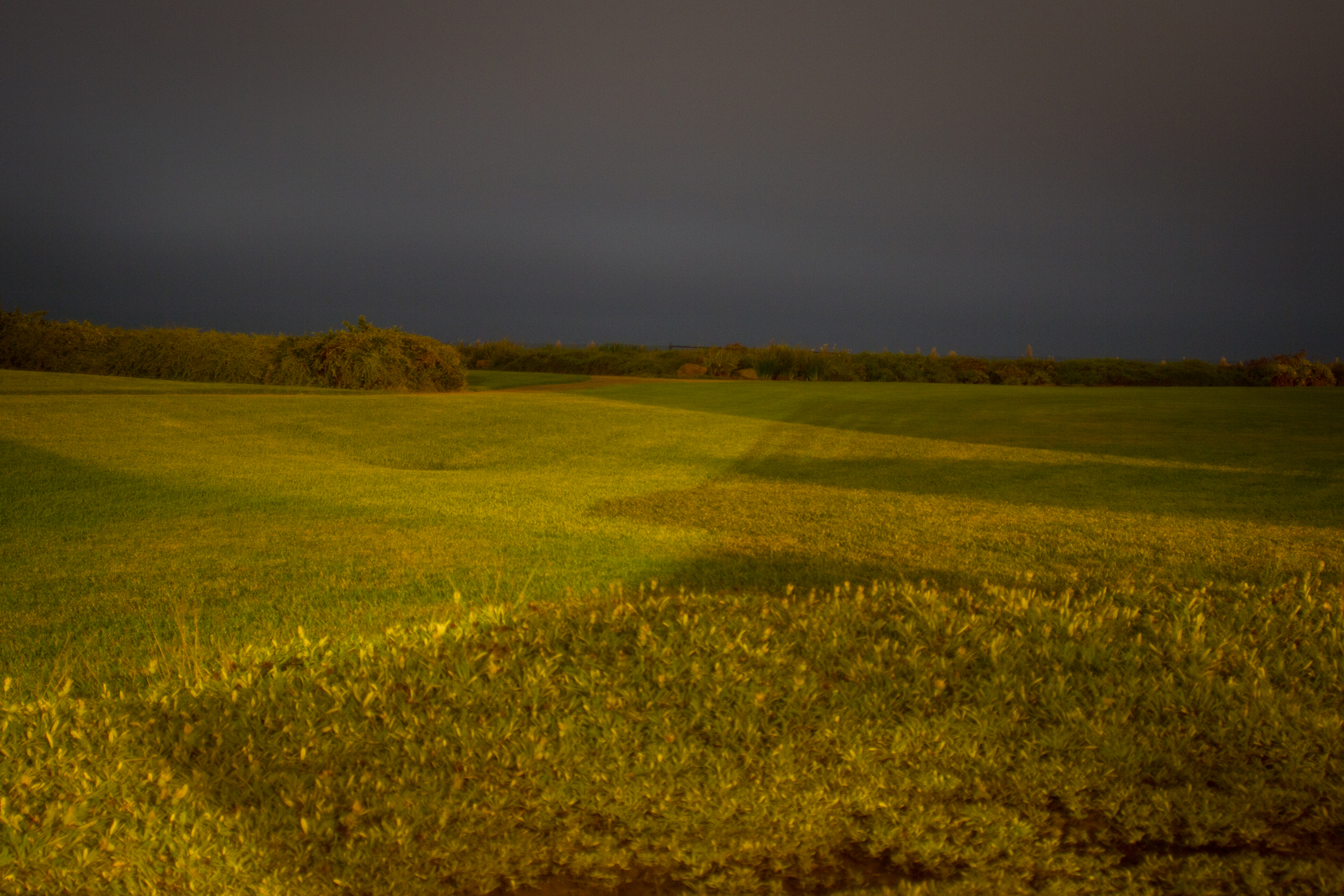
- Grounds at the resort
- Interactive map of the Seascape Beach Resort area

General information
- Location: Aptos, California, United States, 1 Seascape Resort Drive
- Coordinates: 36°57′2.58″N 121°52′37.57″W

Technical details
- Floor area: 45 acres

Other information
- Number of rooms: 285
- Number of restaurants: 1

Website
- Official website

The Seascape Beach Resort is a resort located in Aptos, California in the United States.

== History ==
The development of Seascape Beach Resort on land known as the Seascape Benchlands began with the Aptos Seascape Corporation in the 1960s. The Seascape Benchlands property was purchased by The Holcomb Corporation in the 1980's and Seascape Beach Resort was built and developed by The Holcomb Corporation and Seascape Resort Ltd. in the 1990's. The resort is located on 45 acres of the privately owned Seascape Beach, which lies between Capitola and the Pajaro River. The resort is adjacent to Seascape Park. It overlooks the Monterey Bay. It is the largest privately owned single development project in Aptos. While founded in the 1960s, it wasn't until the 1990s that the first condominiums were built. All of the Condos within the development are individually owned and are zoned visitor accommodations. Owners can choose either resort management or self manage via VRBO, Airbnb, etc,. The hotel has been visited by Pablo Sandoval, Justin Bieber and Selena Gomez.

== Facilities ==
There are 285 rooms onsite spread over seven buildings. The decor is described as "beach house" style "painted with muted pastels, neutral tones, and panoramic views." The resort has one restaurant, Sanderlings Restaurant. There is an offsite spa, called the Sanctuary Spa, 6 adjacent tennis courts, beach access, and a putting green. There is a nearby golf course in the unincorporated town of Rio Del Mar, less than 2 miles away.
