= LaTour Demonstration State Forest =

State forest in northern California

Coordinates: 40.640°N 121.703°W

Interactive map of LaTour Demonstration State Forest

LaTour Demonstration State Forest is a state forest totaling 9,033 acres in the southern Cascade Range and Shasta County, in northern California.

It became a state forest in 1946.

== Geography ==
It is located at the edge of the Lassen National Forest. south of Burney and east of Redding.

LaTour forest contains many interesting volcanic and glacial geological features.

The forest is accessible by vehicle from late June to November.

== Trees ==
The forest supports 10 coniferous tree species of commercial value. These are sugar pine, ponderosa pine, Jeffrey pine, western white pine, lodgepole pine, Douglas fir, white fir, red fir, incense cedar, and mountain hemlock.

The stands contain lesser amounts of hardwood trees, such as California black oak, canyon live oak, big leaf maple, and red alder.
