= Soquel Creek =

River of Santa Cruz County, California

Soquel Creek Rosario del Beato Serafin de Asculi

Location
- Country: United States
- State: California
- Region: Santa Cruz County
- Cities: Soquel, Capitola

Physical characteristics
- Source
  - location: Southern Santa Cruz Mountains
  - coordinates: 37°06′37″N 121°54′38″W
  - elevation: 3,000 ft (910 m)
- Mouth: Monterey Bay
  - coordinates: 36°58′18″N 121°57′07″W
  - elevation: 0 ft (0 m)
- Length: 16 mi (26 km)
- Basin size: 42 mi^{2} (110 km^{2})
- Discharge
  - location: USGS Soquel Creek gage (11160000)
  - minimum: 405 cu ft/s (11.5 m^{3}/s)
  - maximum: 15,800 cu ft/s (450 m^{3}/s)

Basin features
- Tributaries
  - left: West Branch Soquel Creek, Burns Creek, Laurel Creek, Hester Creek
  - right: East Branch Soquel Creek, Fern Gulch, Asbury Gulch, Amaya Creek, Hinckley Creek

Soquel Creek is a southward flowing 16 miles (26 km) creek that begins in the Santa Cruz Mountains in Santa Cruz County, California and enters Monterey Bay at Capitola Beach in Capitola, California.

== History and ecology ==
The redwood (Sequoia sempervirens) forests of the middle and upper watershed were heavily logged during the second half of the 1800s, and into the twentieth century. Most of today's forests are second growth, with most trees now over one hundred years old.

Water quality of the creek is measured by the County of Santa Cruz.

== Watershed and course ==
Soquel Creek drains the largest watershed of mid-Santa Cruz County, and passes through the communities of Soquel and Capitola. Part of the creek's upper reaches flow through Soquel Demonstration State Forest and the western part of The Forest of Nisene Marks State Park. About 25% of the headwaters of the watershed are on land protected by the state.

== See also ==
- Rivers of California
