= Rancho San Andrés =

18th-century Mexican land grant

Coordinates: 36.920°N 121.830°W

Rancho San Andrés was an 8,911-acre (36.06 km^{2}) Mexican land grant in present-day Santa Cruz County, California, given in 1833 by Governor José Figueroa to José Joaquín Castro. The grant on Monterey Bay extended from La Selva Beach on the north to Watsonville Slough on the south. Rancho Aptos, belonging to Castro's son Rafael Castro, formed the north boundary of the grant.

== History ==
José Joaquín Castro (1768–1838), the son of Joaquin Ysidro de Castro and Maria Marina Botiller, had come as a boy with his family to California from Mexico with the De Anza Expedition in 1775. His brother José Mariano Castro (1765–1828) was the grantee of Rancho Las Animas; his brother Carlos Antonio Castro (b.1775) was the grantee of Rancho San Francisco de las Llagas; and his brother Francisco María Castro (1775 – 1831) was the grantee of Rancho San Pablo. Jose Joaquin Castro, after serving as a soldier for 13 years, came with his wife Maria Antonia Amador (1780–1827) to settle the new community of Villa de Branciforte in 1798. Maria Antonia Amador died in 1827, and Castro married Maria Rosario Briones (b. 1816) in 1830. Castro received the two square league Rancho San Andrés grant in 1833. In 1838, José Joaquín Castro died of smallpox.

With the cession of California to the United States following the Mexican-American War, the 1848 Treaty of Guadalupe Hidalgo provided that the land grants would be honored. As required by the Land Act of 1851, a claim for Rancho San Andrés was filed with the Public Land Commission in 1853, and the grant was patented to Guadalupe Castro and Juan José Castro et al. (the 13 children of José Joaquín Castro) in 1876.

After the patent was issued, there was a boundary dispute with José Amesti's Rancho Los Corralitos which adjoined Rancho San Andrés on the east.

In 1877, a partition suit (Briody vs. Hale) was brought and Rancho San Andrés was subdivided.

== Historic sites of the Rancho ==
- Castro Adobe. Rancho San Andrés Castro Adobe.
