= Amaya Creek =

River in California, United States

Coordinates: 37°4′29.81″N 121°55′30.85″W

Amaya Creek is a creek located Santa Cruz County, California, United States. It is part of the Soquel Creek watershed. The creek was named after two brothers who owned the land around it, circa 1860: Casimero and Dario Amaya.
