= Aptos Creek =

Creek in Santa Cruz County, California

Aptos Creek Arroyo de Outos
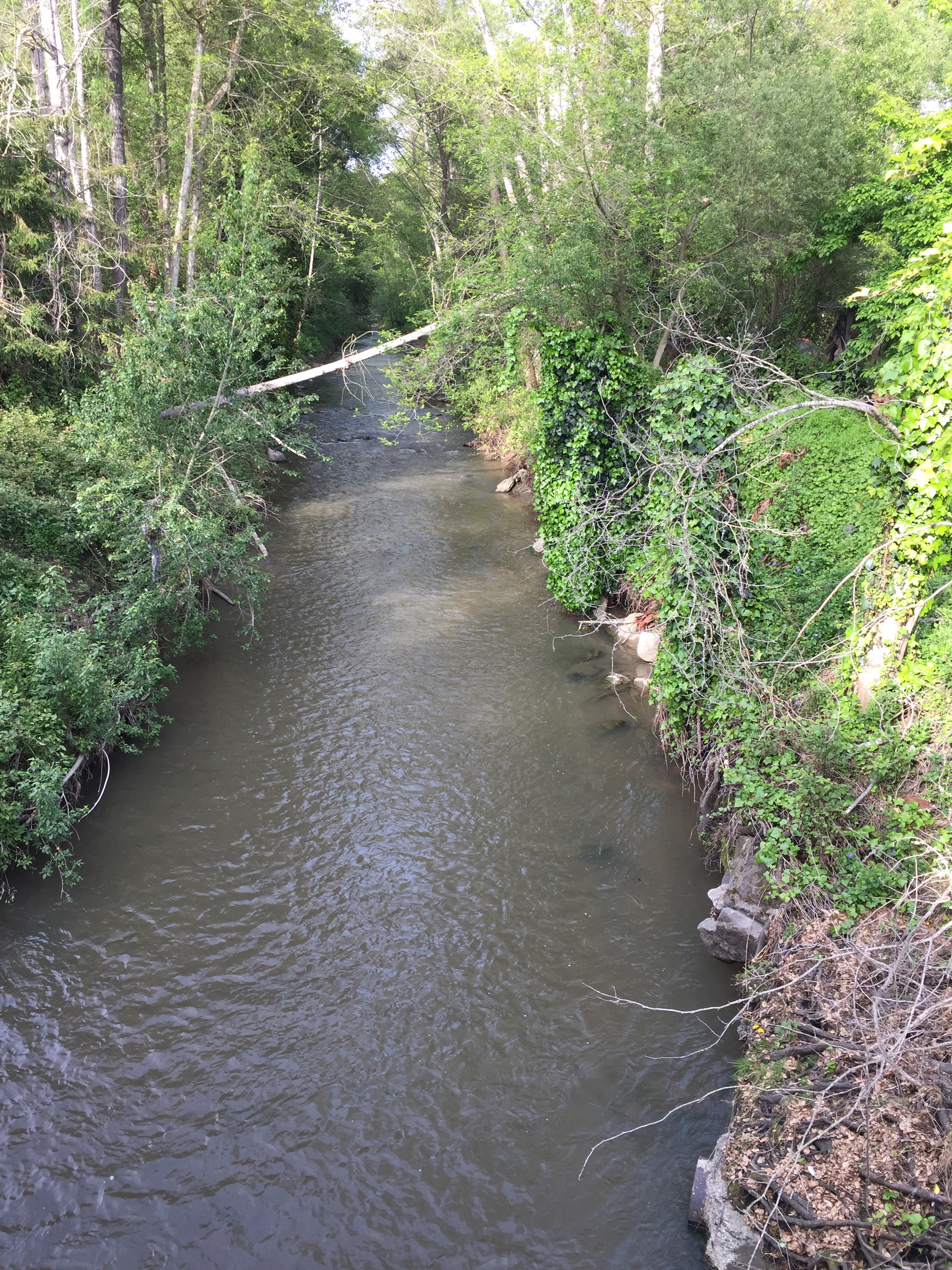
- Aptos Creek at Spreckels Boulevard bridge in April, 2017

Location
- Country: United States
- State: California
- Region: Santa Cruz County
- City: Aptos

Physical characteristics
- Source
  - location: Southwest flank of Santa Rosalia Mountain
  - coordinates: 37°04′19″N 121°51′26″W
  - elevation: 2,502 ft (763 m)
- Mouth: Monterey Bay
  - coordinates: 36°58′11″N 121°54′22″W
  - elevation: 7 ft (2.1 m)

Basin features
- Tributaries
  - left: Mangels Gulch, Valencia Creek
  - right: Bridge Creek

Aptos Creek is a southward-flowing 9.5-mile (15.3-kilometer) creek that begins on Santa Rosalia Mountain on the southwestern slope of the Santa Cruz Mountains in Santa Cruz County, California, and enters Monterey Bay at Seacliff State Beach in Aptos.

== History ==
The earliest record of "Outos" or "Aptos" is Arroyo de Outos in 1796, thought to be pronunciations of an Ohlone (Sp. Costanoan) village at the junction of Aptos and Valencia Creeks. They come together now below Highway 1 and the overpass of Spreckles Drive. Rancho de Aptos was a sheep ranch of Mission Santa Cruz shown on documents dating to July 5, 1807. Rancho Aptos was a 6,686-acre (27.06 km^{2}) Mexican land grant in present-day Santa Cruz County, given in 1833 by Governor José Figueroa to Rafael Castro.

== Watershed and course ==
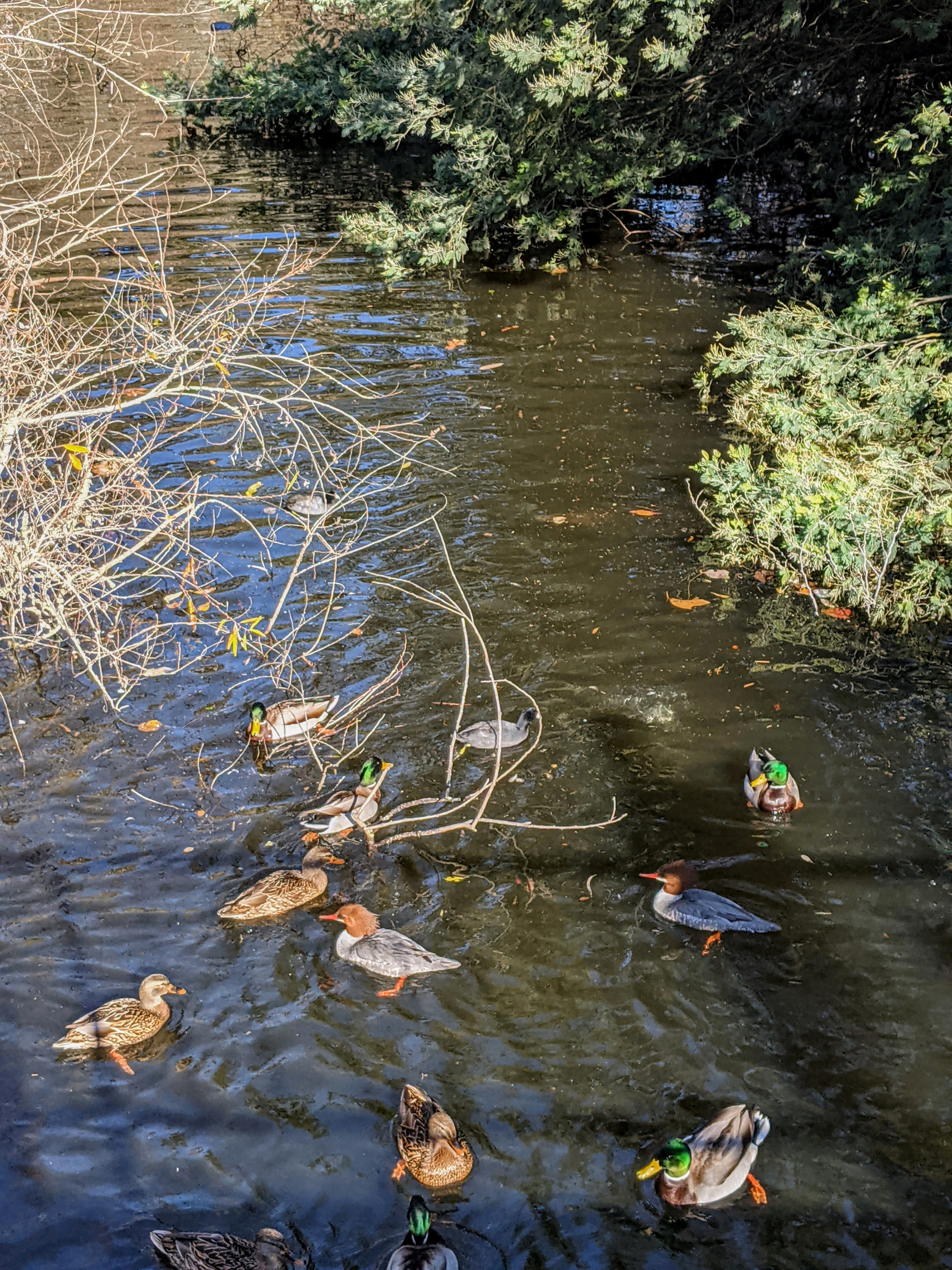
Water birds in Aptos Creek, including common mergansers, coots, and mallards

The Aptos Creek watershed drains 24.5 square miles (63 km^{2}) beginning on the southwestern slope of the 2,585-foot-tall (788-meter) Santa Rosalia Mountain in the western Santa Cruz Mountains. The watershed is found inside the Coast Range Ecoregion that runs almost completely from the border of Oregon to the southernmost boundary of the Santa Cruz Mountains. It includes every stream south of San Francisco that originates from the Santa Cruz Mountains. Aptos Creek emerges into northern Monterey Bay at Seacliff State Beach which is located about 10 kilometres (6.2 mi) east of Santa Cruz. At the mouth of the creek, beaches host 30-meter-high (98-foot) cliffs. The lower part of the Aptos Creek basin is characterized by its location in an area of low-density residential developments. Still, over 60% of the watershed of the Aptos Creek mainstem lies within and is protected by The Forest of Nisene Marks State Park. The major tributaries are (from top to bottom) Bridge Creek, Mangels Gulch, and then Valencia Creek (shortly after the latter receives its Trout Gulch tributary).

Aptos Creek serves as a drain in the Soquel-Aptos area, along with Branciforte Creek, Soquel Creek, and West Branch Soquel Creek. All three are perennial streams that have a component of base flow discharge across the year. There are gaging stations for the Soquel-Aptos Area both in Aptos Creek in Aptos itself and in Aptos Creek but just outside Aptos. The former is located at 36°58'33"N and the drainage area is 31.9 kilometers squared. The latter can be found at 121°54'05"W and has a drainage area of 26.4 kilometers squared.

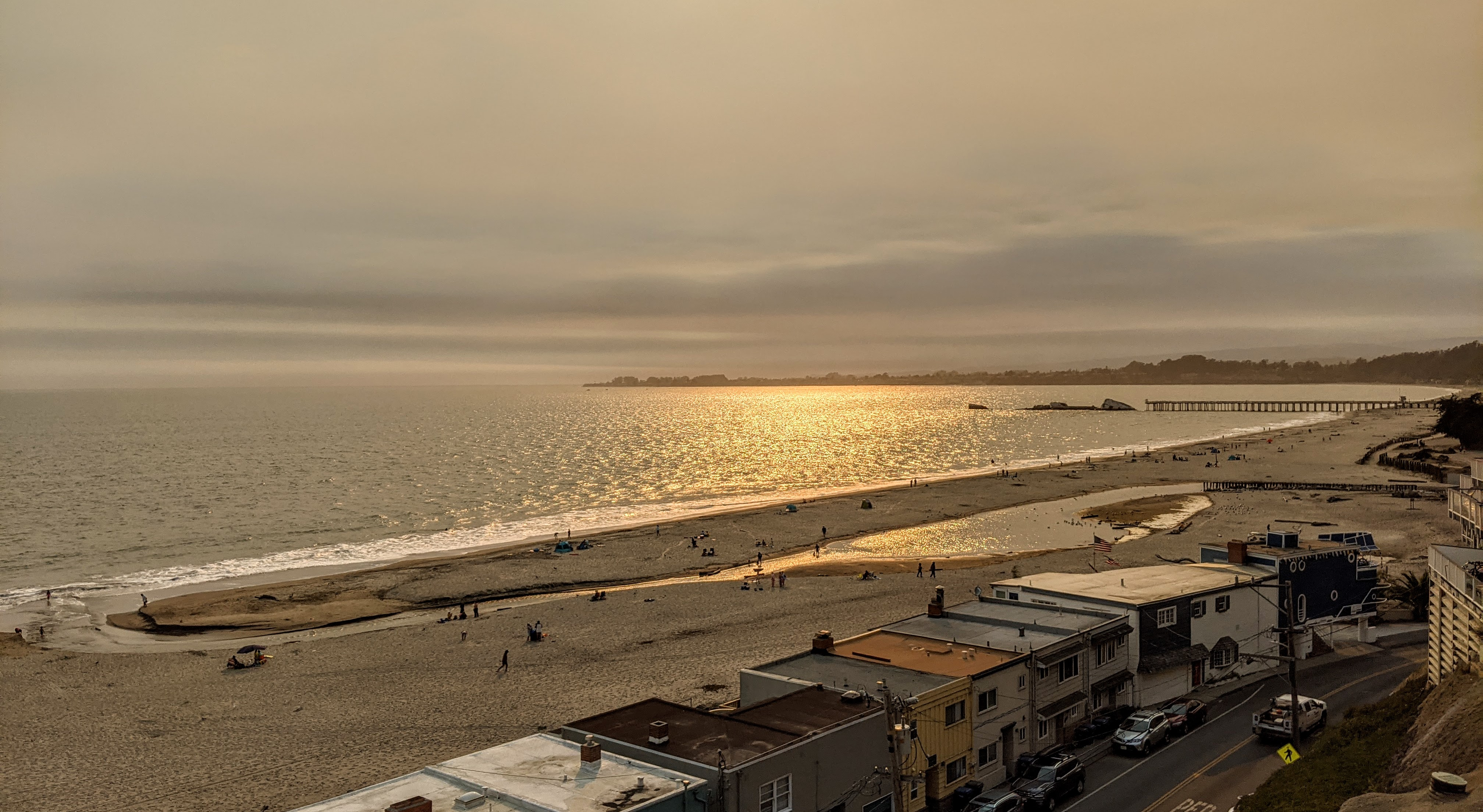
The mouth of Aptos Creek, from above Beach Drive, with the orange sunlight of August 2020 wildfires

== Ecology ==
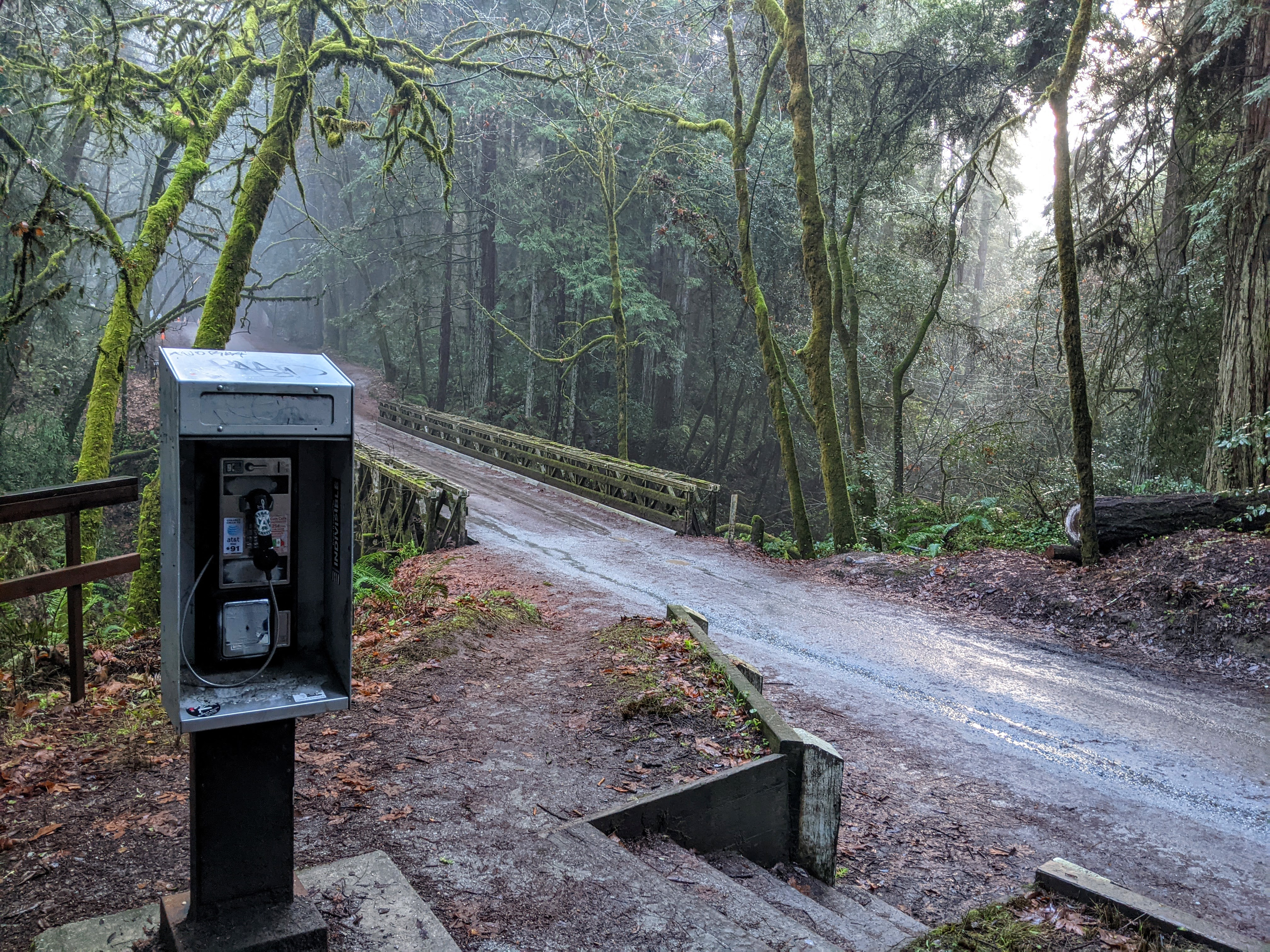
Aptos Creek steel bridge in the middle of the Forest of Nisene Marks State Park, with pay phone

The middle and upper watershed is in a second-growth redwood (Sequoia sempervirens) forest that was clearcut over a forty-year period from 1883 to 1923. Most visible trees along the coastline today were planted intentionally. This is because Native Americans who used to call the beaches home would burn down trees in order to protect themselves from the threat of wildfires.

Coho salmon (Oncorhynchus kisutch) and steelhead trout (Oncorhynchus mykiss) in Central Coast streams are federally listed as endangered and threatened species, respectively. Aptos Creek can also be described as an anadromous fish stream, meaning that it serves as a passageway for fish migrating up rivers from the sea in order to breed. It is one of the larger steelhead spawning streams in Santa Cruz and San Mateo Counties. Aptos Creek is the southern limit of the federally threatened Central California Coast Steelhead distinct population segment (DPS). However, sediment pollution limits steelhead recruitment. The fish found in these sorts of environments have been observed to have subtle cranial depressions as well as vertebral-column and lower-jaw anomalies, which may have been prompted by both natural and human causes such as fires, droughts, floods, and impoundments. Aptos Creek is also the southern limit of the federally endangered Central California Coast coho salmon evolutionary significant unit (ESU).

== Human impacts and activities ==
A concrete dam was built across the mouth of Aptos Creek in March 1928. The purpose was to create a bathing pavilion, the Rio Del Mar Pavilion and Dam, that upon completion was publicized as "the world's largest freshwater swimming pool". The midstream floating diving platform and canoe rentals attracted visitors to the pool that was complete with steps and handrails.

There was an island in the creek that was known as Lover's Retreat. It housed nine honeymoon cottages, barns, stables, and an outdoor dance pavilion surrounded by live oaks. However, the logging industry soon gained prominence, and the area grew rugged, causing it to lose its aesthetic appeal. Today, Lover's Retreat is no longer an island can be found instead as Treasure Island.

Many visitors of the Forest of Nisene Marks like to picnic alongside the creek. Others like to hike, bike, walk dogs, and jog on the Aptos Creek Fire Road, which ventures through the forest.

Aptos Creek can also be accessed in Aptos Village Park on Aptos Creek Road, which includes picnic areas, the Aptos Village Park Hall, barbecues, lawn areas, and redwood trees.

== See also ==
- The Forest of Nisene Marks State Park
- Rivers of California
