= The Forest of Nisene Marks State Park =

State park in Santa Cruz County, California, United States

- IUCN category V (protected landscape/seascape)
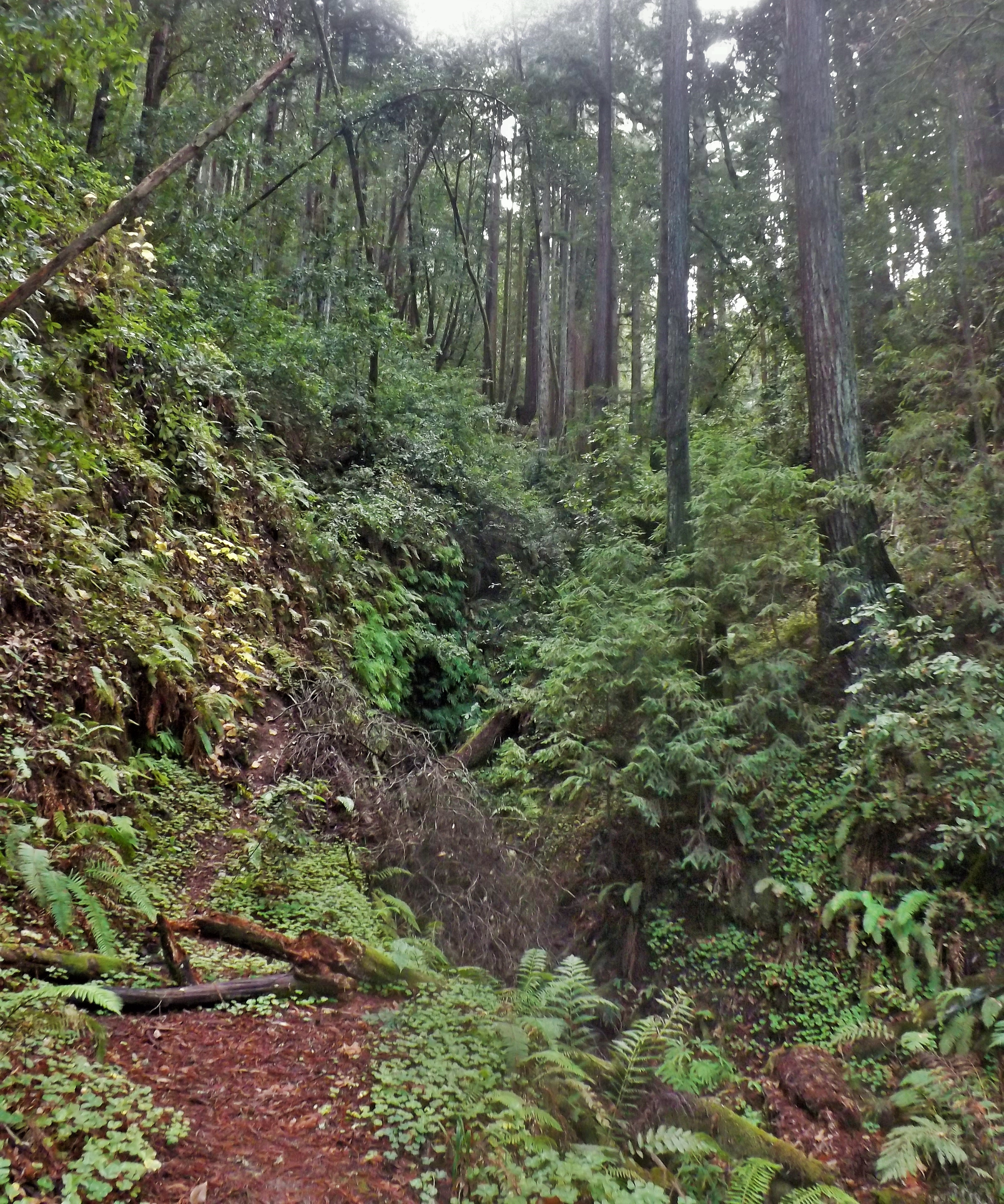
- Redwood trees in the Forest of Nisene Marks

- Location within California Location within the United States
- Location: Santa Cruz, California, United States
- Nearest city: Aptos, California
- Coordinates: 37°3′N 121°53′W
- Area: 10,223 acres (41.37 km^{2})
- Governing body: California Department of Parks and Recreation

The Forest of Nisene Marks State Park is a state park of California, United States, protecting a secondary forest in the watershed of Aptos Creek and Soquel Creek within the Santa Cruz Mountains. It is located outside Aptos, California, and contains over 40 miles (64 km) of hiking trails and fire roads through 10,223 acres (4,137 ha) of variable terrain.

== History ==
The park was named after Nisene Marks, a passionate nature lover and the mother of a Salinas farming family who purchased the land, mostly parts of the former Rancho Soquel, from lumber companies and others in the hope of finding oil. When drilling efforts failed, Marks' children, with the help of the Nature Conservancy, donated the original 9,700 acres (3,900 ha) to the state of California in her memory in 1963.

The first known inhabitants of the land now called Nisene Marks were the Ohlone people. They relied on the land, harvesting and utilizing the natural resources along the edges of the forest. The California State Parks department, with additional help from the Save the Redwoods League, expanded the park to 10,036 acres (4,061 ha). The park is on land that was clear-cut during a forty-year period of logging (1883–1923) by the Loma Prieta Lumber Company. Evidence of logging operations, mill sites and trestles is visible in the park. In recent years, an ancient grove of redwood trees was preserved and added to the park.

The park offers rugged semi-wilderness, rising from sea level to steep coastal mountains of more than 2,600 feet (790 m). The park is a popular spot for running, hiking and horseback riding. Mountain biking is restricted to the fire road as of 2004 because of deed restrictions regarding the state park.

The epicenter of the Loma Prieta earthquake on October 17, 1989, was in this park. The quake's epicenter and Five Finger Falls are the two most popular attractions in the park.

== Natural history ==
Four-fifths of the park is covered in dense redwood forest. Chaparral is found on a few of the hotter, steeper ridges. Douglas firs grow among redwoods in a number of areas. Other trees species include: alders, maples, and cottonwoods near creeks; tanoaks in the understory of redwoods; and Pacific madrone, California bay, and several oak species.

The park is inhabited by a number of animals. This list includes banana slugs, which can be found in various forests in Santa Cruz, as well as California slender salamanders. Additionally, a multitude of plant varieties can be found in the park. Various mushrooms and native plants are commonly seen, including parrot mushrooms and Solomon's plume flowers.

== Geology ==
The San Andreas, San Gregorio, and Zayante earthquake faults affect the geology of the state park. Slightly southeast of park boundaries runs the San Gregorio; the Zayante fault intersects with the Aptos Creek Canyon in the park, and the San Andreas fault runs parallel to the northeastern border.

The epicenter of the Loma Prieta earthquake on October 17, 1989, was in this park. The quake's epicenter and Five Finger Falls are the two most popular attractions in the park. Various ancient marine sedimentary rocks can be found exposed in creek beds in the park, as the area of the park used to be a shallow inland sea. The soil of the park is sandy and loamy, and therefore vulnerable to landslides.

== Recreation ==
The park is a popular spot for running, hiking, and horseback riding. Additionally, it is a common location for mountain biking, which can be done on several trails, including the Aptos Rancho Trail, Split Stuff Trail, Terrace Trail, and Vienna Woods Trail. The park includes picnic tables where visitors can sit and enjoy the sights.

== Regulations ==
- Natural and cultural features of the park may not be removed or disturbed.
- Stay on marked trails to avoid erosion.
- Biking is only permitted on the Aptos Creek fire road and the four single-track trails below the steel bridge.
- With the exception of service animals, dogs are only allowed on the Aptos Creek fire road and the four single-track trails below the steel bridge. Dogs must be on leash at all times.
- Horses are only permitted on the Aptos Creek fire road and the four single-track trails below the steel bridge. Horses are not allowed past the steel bridge.
- There is currently no camping in the park.
- Fires are prohibited in all areas of the park.
- There is an $8 vehicle day-use fee.

== See also ==
- List of California state parks
