= Rio del Mar, California =

Rio del Mar
- Census-designated Place; Unincorporated community
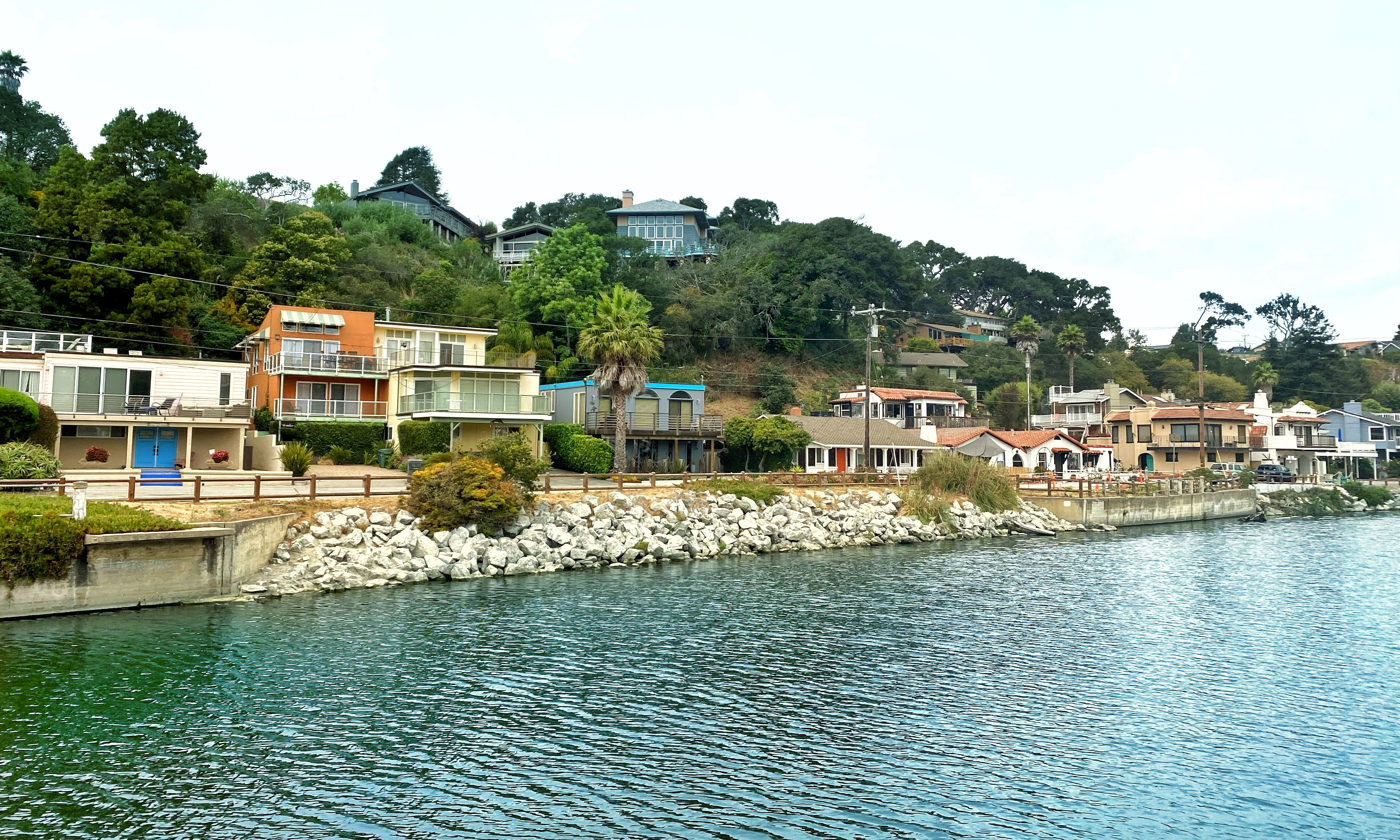
- View of Rio del Mar and the Aptos Creek

- Location in Santa Cruz County and the state of California

- Location in the United States
- Coordinates: 36°57′50″N 121°53′16″W
- Country: United States
- State: California
- County: Santa Cruz

Area
  - Total: 4.611 sq mi (11.943 km^{2})
  - Land: 3.000 sq mi (7.770 km^{2})
  - Water: 1.611 sq mi (4.173 km^{2}) 34.94%
- Elevation: 144 ft (44 m)

Population (2020)
  - Total: 9,128
  - Density: 3,043/sq mi (1,175/km^{2})
- Time zone: UTC-8 (PST)
  - Summer (DST): UTC-7 (PDT)
- ZIP code: 95003
- Area code: 831
- FIPS code: 06-60928
- GNIS feature ID: 1659513

Rio del Mar (Spanish: Río del Mar, meaning "River of the Sea") is an unincorporated village in Santa Cruz County, California, United States. Rio del Mar is one of several small villages that form the unincorporated community of Aptos. Its population was 9,128 as of the 2020 United States census. For statistical purposes, the United States Census Bureau has defined Rio del Mar as a census-designated place (CDP).

== Etymology ==
The name, from Spanish: Río del Mar, meaning river of the sea, was chosen to promote real estate in the area during the 1920s.

== Geography ==
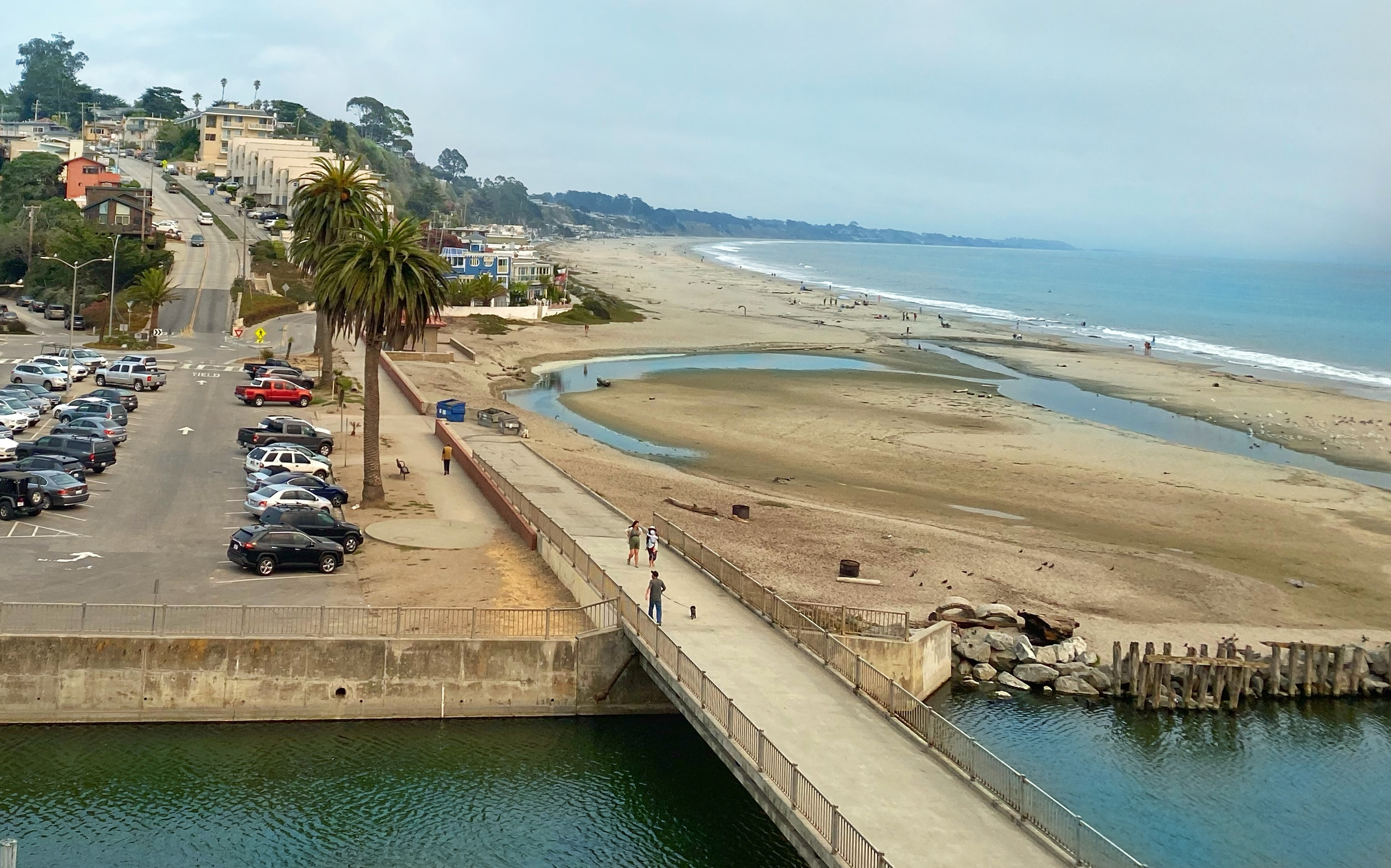
View of Rio del Mar State Beach.

According to the United States Census Bureau, the CDP has a total area of 4.6 square miles (12 km^{2}), of which 3.0 square miles (7.8 km^{2}) is land and 1.6 square miles (4.1 km^{2}) (34.94%) is water. For statistical purposes, the United States Census Bureau has defined Rio del Mar as a census-designated place (CDP). The census definition of the area may not precisely correspond to local understanding of the area with the same name.

Aptos Creek flows through Rio del Mar and empties into the Monterey Bay.

== Demographics ==
Historical population
Census	Pop.	Note	%±
1980	7,067		—
1990	8,919		26.2%
2000	9,198		3.1%
2010	9,216		0.2%
2020	9,128		−1.0%
U.S. Decennial Census; 1860–1870 1880-1890; 1900 1910 1920; 1930 1940 1950; 1960 1970 1980; 1990 2000 2010; 2020

Rio del Mar first appeared as an unincorporated community in the 1980 U.S. census; and then as a census-designated place in the 1980 United States census.

=== Racial and ethnic composition ===
Rio del Mar CDP, California – Racial and ethnic composition Note: the US Census treats Hispanic/Latino as an ethnic category. This table excludes Latinos from the racial categories and assigns them to a separate category. Hispanics/Latinos may be of any race.
Race / Ethnicity (NH = Non-Hispanic)	Pop 2000	Pop 2010	Pop 2020	% 2000	% 2010	% 2020
White alone (NH)	8,081	7,704	6,964	87.86%	83.59%	76.29%
Black or African American alone (NH)	53	54	56	0.58%	0.59%	0.61%
Native American or Alaska Native alone (NH)	38	28	16	0.41%	0.30%	0.18%
Asian alone (NH)	233	307	351	2.53%	3.33%	3.85%
Native Hawaiian or Pacific Islander alone (NH)	13	6	17	0.14%	0.07%	0.19%
Other race alone (NH)	22	18	49	0.24%	0.20%	0.54%
Mixed race or Multiracial (NH)	164	200	473	1.78%	2.17%	5.18%
Hispanic or Latino (any race)	594	899	1,202	6.46%	9.75%	13.17%
Total	9,198	9,216	9,128	100.00%	100.00%	100.00%

=== 2020 census ===
As of the 2020 census, Rio del Mar had a population of 9,128 and a population density of 5,666.0 inhabitants per square mile (2,187.7/km^{2}).

The census reported that 99.8% of the population lived in households, 0.2% lived in non-institutionalized group quarters, and no one was institutionalized. 99.4% of residents lived in urban areas, while 0.6% lived in rural areas.

The age distribution was 17.1% under the age of 18, 6.7% aged 18 to 24, 16.9% aged 25 to 44, 31.9% aged 45 to 64, and 27.4% who were 65 years of age or older. The median age was 51.5 years. For every 100 females, there were 92.2 males, and for every 100 females age 18 and over, there were 89.5 males age 18 and over.

There were 3,878 households in Rio del Mar, of which 23.9% had children under the age of 18 living in them. Of all households, 53.6% were married-couple households, 13.9% were households with a male householder and no spouse or partner present, and 26.4% were households with a female householder and no spouse or partner present. About 25.7% of all households were made up of individuals and 15.7% had someone living alone who was 65 years of age or older. The average household size was 2.35, and there were 2,587 families (66.7% of all households).

There were 4,931 housing units, of which 3,878 (78.6%) were occupied and 21.4% were vacant. Of occupied units, 73.7% were owner-occupied and 26.3% were occupied by renters. The homeowner vacancy rate was 1.1% and the rental vacancy rate was 5.2%.

=== Demographic estimates ===
In 2023, the US Census Bureau estimated that 7.8% of the population were foreign-born. Of all people aged 5 or older, 88.0% spoke only English at home, 6.2% spoke Spanish, 4.4% spoke other Indo-European languages, 0.7% spoke Asian or Pacific Islander languages, and 0.7% spoke other languages. Of those aged 25 or older, 98.5% were high school graduates and 61.4% had a bachelor's degree.

=== Income and poverty ===
The median household income in 2023 was $150,313, and the per capita income was $91,497. About 1.6% of families and 3.1% of the population were below the poverty line.

=== 2010 census ===
At the 2010 census Rio del Mar had a population of 9,216. The population density was 1,998.3 inhabitants per square mile (771.5/km^{2}). The racial makeup of Rio del Mar was 8,310 (90.2%) White, 61 (0.7%) African American, 50 (0.5%) Native American, 313 (3.4%) Asian, 7 (0.1%) Pacific Islander, 188 (2.0%) from other races, and 287 (3.1%) from two or more races. Hispanic or Latino of any race were 899 people (9.8%).

The census reported that 9,210 people (99.9% of the population) lived in households, 6 (0.1%) lived in non-institutionalized group quarters, and no one was institutionalized.

There were 3,916 households, 1,050 (26.8%) had children under the age of 18 living in them, 2,082 (53.2%) were opposite-sex married couples living together, 337 (8.6%) had a female householder with no husband present, 139 (3.5%) had a male householder with no wife present. There were 228 (5.8%) unmarried opposite-sex partnerships, and 32 (0.8%) same-sex married couples or partnerships. 1,008 households (25.7%) were one person and 486 (12.4%) had someone living alone who was 65 or older. The average household size was 2.35. There were 2,558 families (65.3% of households); the average family size was 2.82.

The age distribution was 1,820 people (19.7%) under the age of 18, 549 people (6.0%) aged 18 to 24, 1,932 people (21.0%) aged 25 to 44, 3,221 people (35.0%) aged 45 to 64, and 1,694 people (18.4%) who were 65 or older. The median age was 47.0 years. For every 100 females, there were 92.6 males. For every 100 females age 18 and over, there were 90.2 males.

There were 4,924 housing units at an average density of 1,067.6 per square mile, of the occupied units 2,848 (72.7%) were owner-occupied and 1,068 (27.3%) were rented. The homeowner vacancy rate was 1.9%; the rental vacancy rate was 8.4%. 6,686 people (72.5% of the population) lived in owner-occupied housing units and 2,524 people (27.4%) lived in rental housing units.

== Government ==
In the California State Legislature, Rio del Mar is in the 17th senatorial district, represented by Democrat John Laird, and in the 30th Assembly district, represented by Democrat Dawn Addis.

In the United States House of Representatives, Rio del Mar is in California's 19th congressional district, represented by Democrat Jimmy Panetta.

== Parks ==
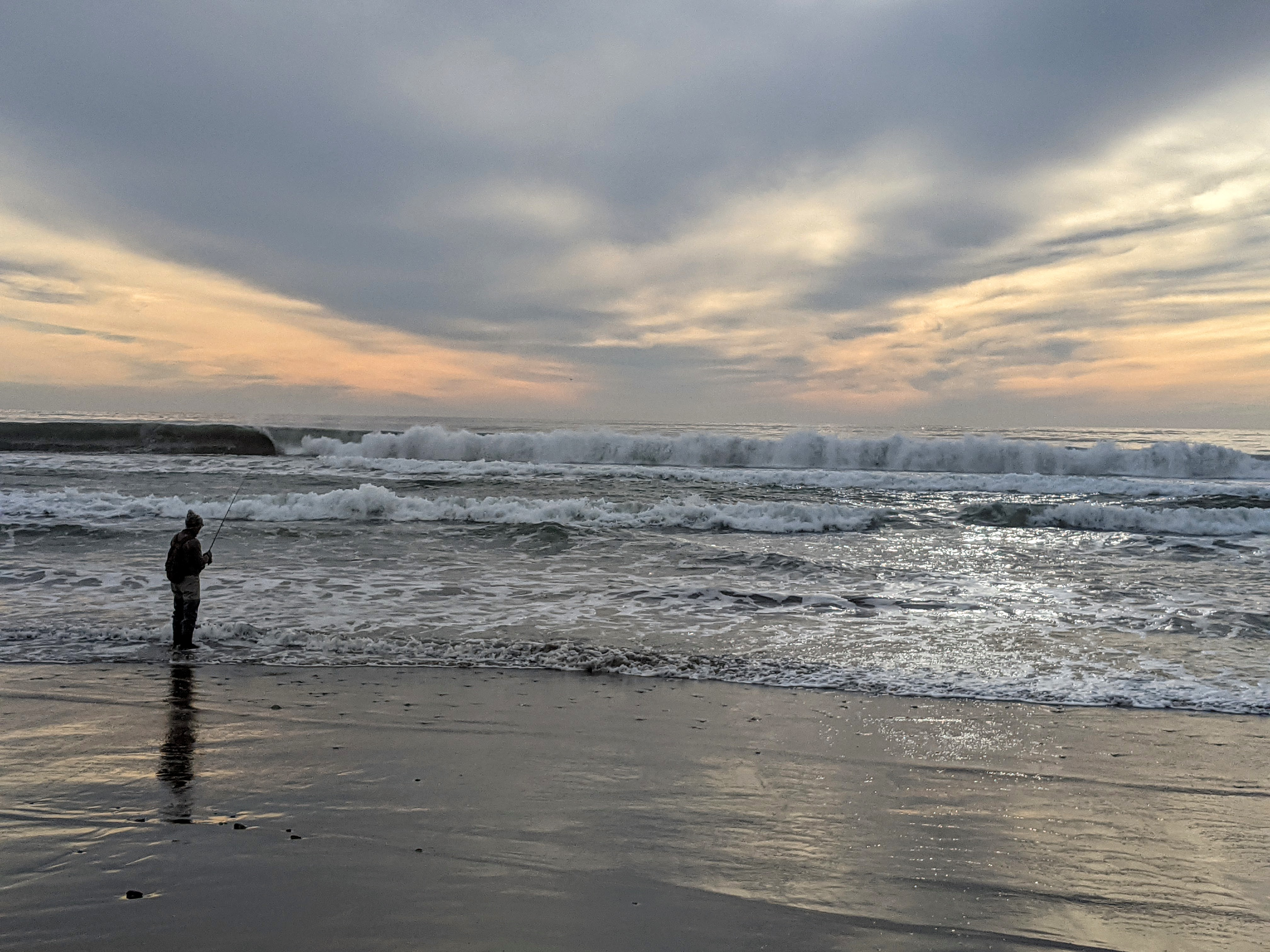
Fishing at Rio Del Mar State Beach on a winter afternoon

Rio del Mar adjoins Seacliff State Beach, which features the remains of the cement ship, the SS Palo Alto. The ship was launched May 29, 1919. It was too late for duty in World War I, and after the war was beached as an entertainment boat, with amenities including a dance floor, a swimming pool and a cafe. The SS "Palo Alto" historically adjoined the beach by a fishing pier which was heavily damaged in the January 2023 storm and subsequently demolished.
