= Seacliff State Beach =

State beach in Santa Cruz County, California, US

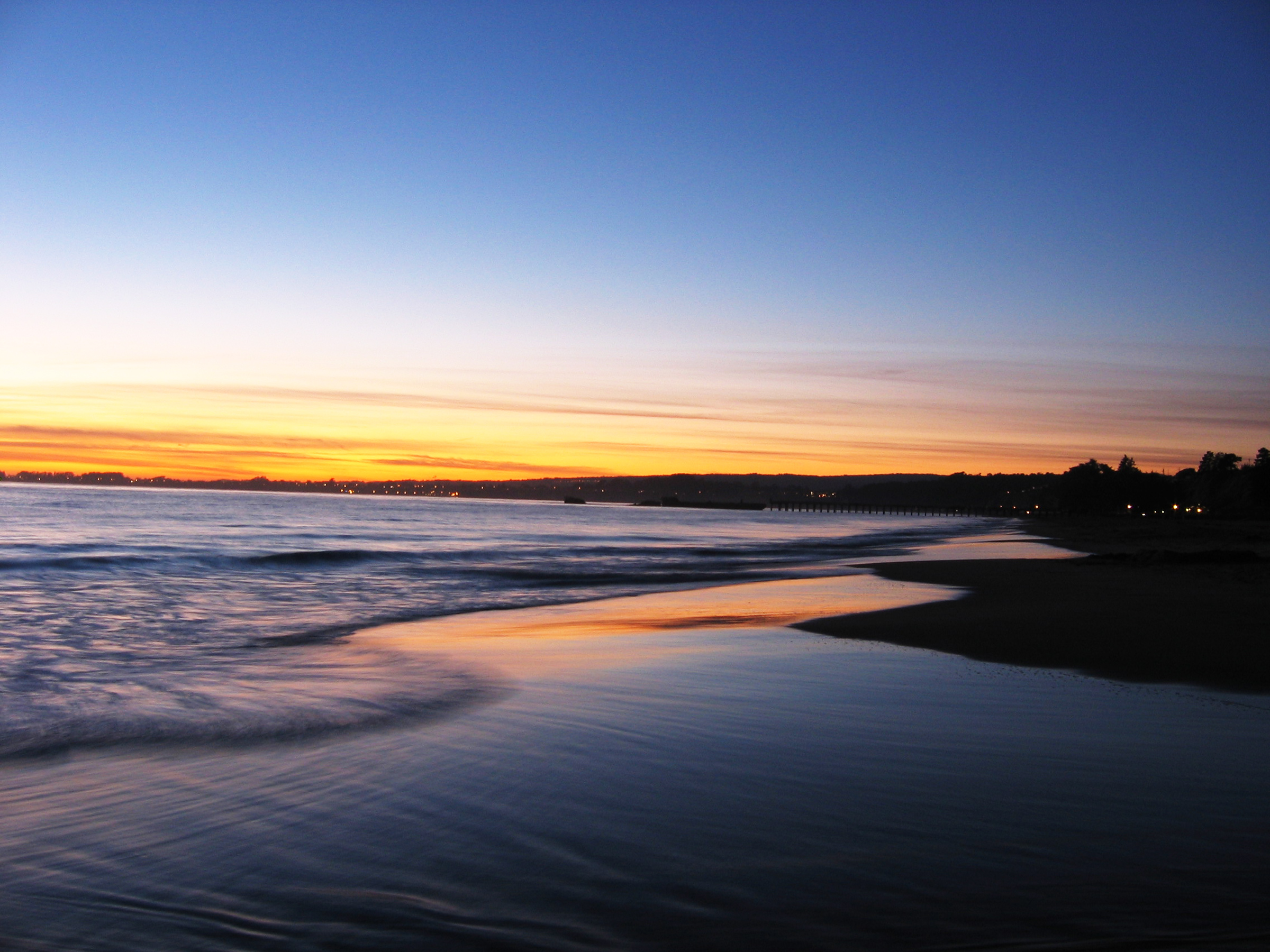

- Location within California Location within the United States
- Location: Aptos, California
- Coordinates: 36°58′20″N 121°54′50″W
- Established: 1931
- Governing body: California Department of Parks and Recreation
- Website: www.parks.ca.gov?page_id=543

Seacliff State Beach is a state beach park on Monterey Bay, in the town of Aptos, Santa Cruz County, California. It is located off Highway 1 on State Park Drive, about 5 miles (8 km) south of Santa Cruz. The beach is most known for the concrete ship SS Palo Alto lying in the water. North of Seacliff State Beach is New Brighton State Beach.

== History ==
The beach was originally home to the Ohlone people. Spanish missionaries established the Mission Santa Cruz about eight miles west of here.

In 1821, when Mexico gained independence from Spain, the area was divided up into land grants. The area of the beach was a part of the Rancho Aptos grant to Rafael Castro in 1833. Castro worked with Claus Spreckels to establish the Castro-Spreckels wharf. The beach soon became a successful shipping port. The logging industry also thrived here with the local coast redwood trees.

The port facilitated major trade with the Kingdom of Hawaiʻi. In 1838, King Kamehameha III requested that Mexican vaqueros from California travel to Hawaiʻi to teach Hawaiians how to manage herds of wild cattle. Seacliff became a popular place to recruit vaqueros, who were known as paniolos by the Hawaiians.

In the 1850s, Thomas Fallon acquired part of the beach and turned it into a resort, which he named "New Brighton", in honor of his favorite seaside resort in England.

In the 1920s, after Claus Spreckels' death, sections of the beach were developed into the Seacliff Park and the Rio Del Mar Country Club.

In 1930, the first California state grant for preserving land was granted for the beach and, in 1931, it became a state beach.

=== SS Palo Alto ===
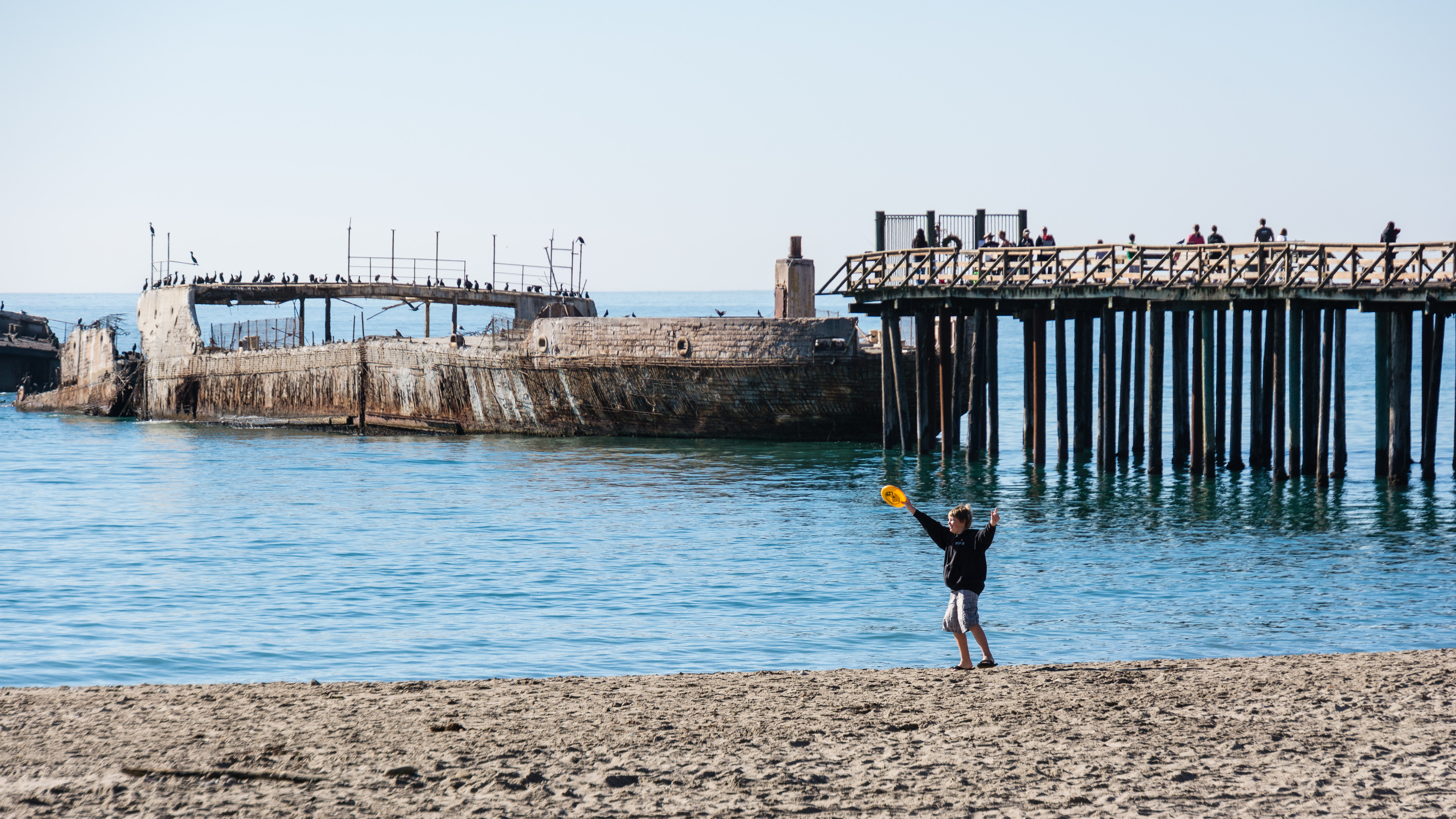
Remains of SS Palo Alto and pier, 2014

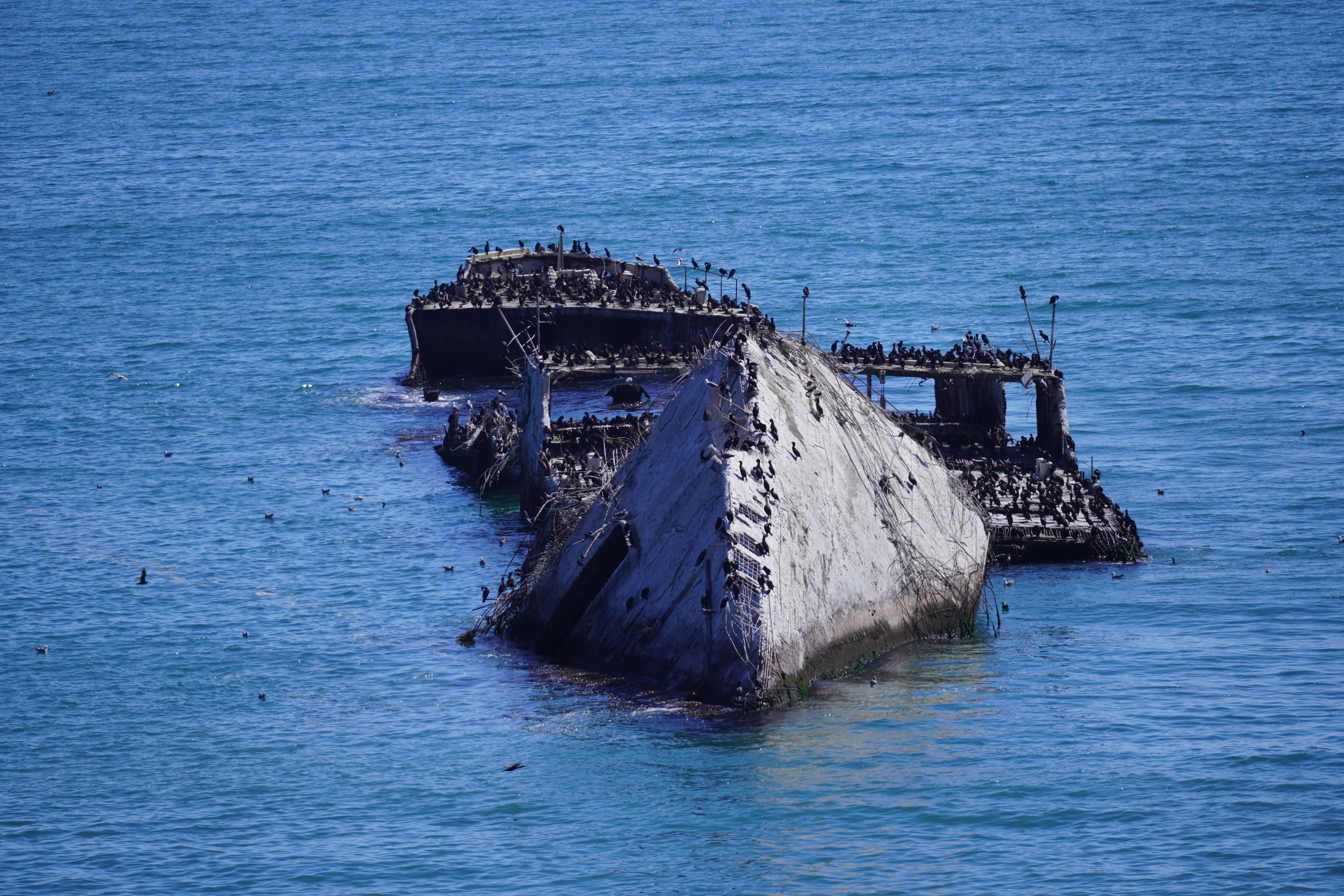
Remains of SS Palo Alto, 2024

The beach's most notable feature is the World War I concrete ship SS Palo Alto formerly lying at the end of a wooden pier. The unfinished ship was hauled to Seacliff Beach in 1930 by the Cal-Nevada Company, beached, and turned into an amusement center, complete with a ballroom, a cafe, a 4-foot heated pool, and carnival booths. The company went bankrupt after two seasons and the ship was stripped. It is now permanently closed to the public. In the 2016–2017 storm season, a section of the ship overturned, and the pier was damaged. During the 2022–2023 storms, the ship was further broken down and the pier was extensively damaged, with the part closest to the ship being destroyed. Demolition of the pier began on March 20, 2023 and has since been completed.

== Animal and plant life ==
The beach is home to many types of birds and marine life, including mussels, ocean worms, sea stars, sea anemones, barnacles, rock crabs, harbor seals, anglers, flounder, mackerel, halibut, lingcod, perch, cabezon, jacksmelt, steelhead, anchovy, bocaccio (tomcod), kingfish, dark seabirds, sea lions, dolphins, sea otters, whales, and great white sharks. The Palo Alto serves as a main place for marine life.

== Recreation ==
Seacliff includes RV facilities, picnic tables, and fire pits. It is also a popular place for surfing and fishing.

== See also ==
- List of beaches in California
- List of California state parks
  - California State Beaches
