= Soquel, California =

- Census-designated place
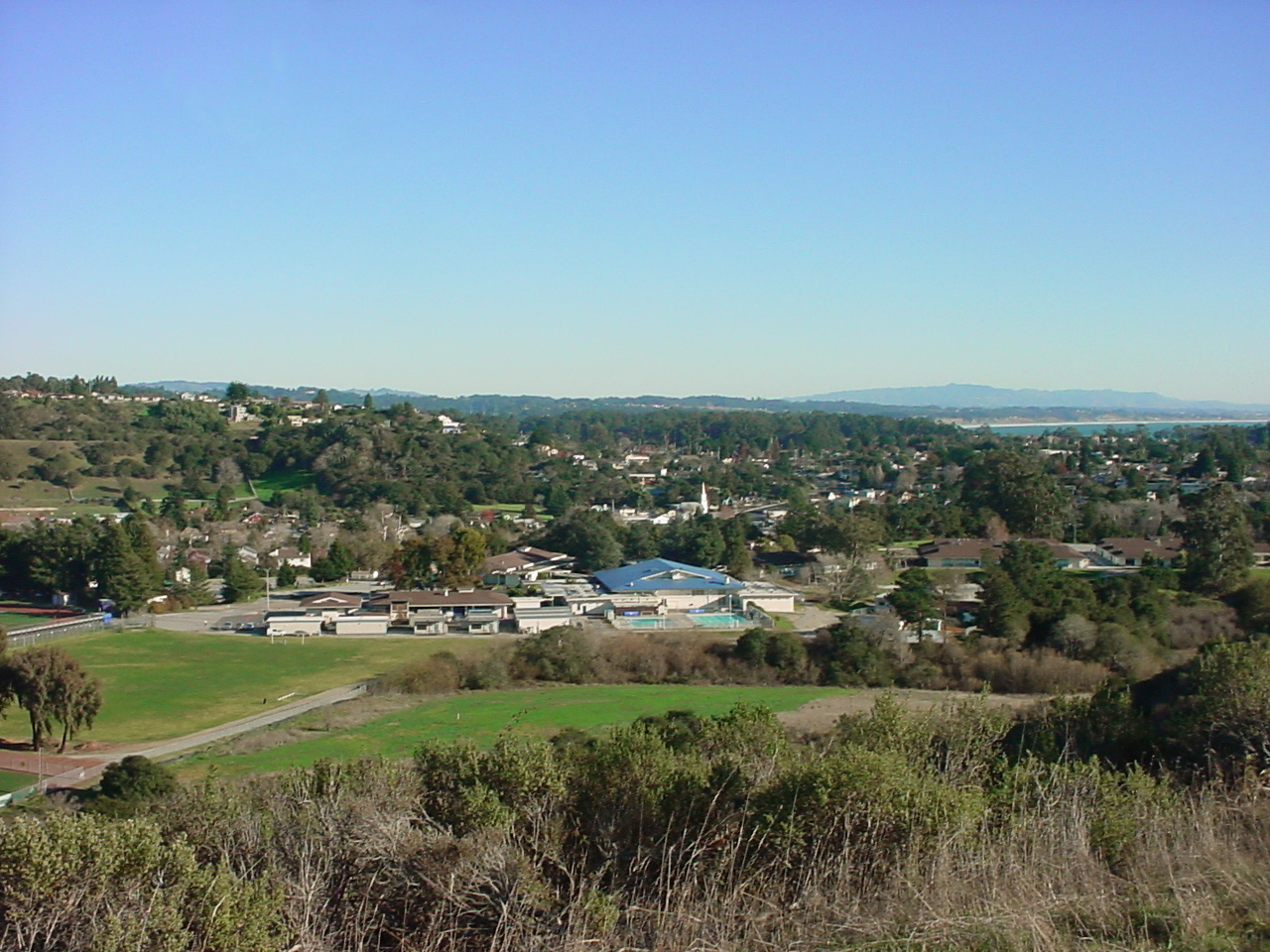
- Soquel as seen from a hilltop in Anna Jean Cummings Park

- Location in Santa Cruz County and the state of California

- Location in the United States
- Coordinates: 36°59′13″N 121°56′44″W
- Country: United States
- State: California
- County: Santa Cruz

Area
  - Total: 4.597 sq mi (11.905 km^{2})
  - Land: 4.597 sq mi (11.905 km^{2})
  - Water: 0 sq mi (0 km^{2}) 0%
- Elevation: 33 ft (10 m)

Population (2020)
  - Total: 9,980
  - Density: 2,170/sq mi (838/km^{2})
- Time zone: UTC-8 (Pacific)
  - Summer (DST): UTC-7 (PDT)
- ZIP code: 95073
- Area code: 831
- FIPS code: 06-72688
- GNIS feature IDs: 1659817, 2408757

Soquel (/soʊˈkɛl/; Ohlone: Sokel) is an unincorporated town and census-designated place (CDP) in Santa Cruz County, California, United States, located on the northern coast of Monterey Bay. The population was 9,980 at the 2020 census.

== History ==
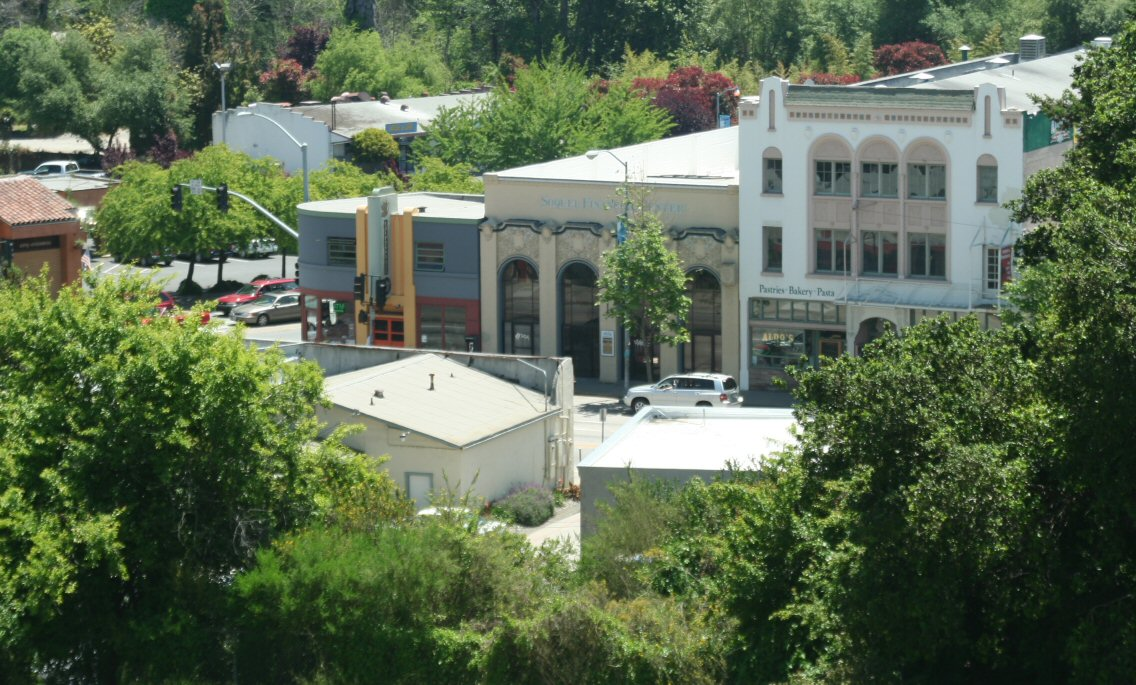
Downtown Soquel

Osocalis was the Spanish phonetic rendering for the name of the creek which runs through the area, as transcribed from the local Native American Indian language of the Ohlone peoples. The later name "Soquel," which was subsequently derived from the name of that creek, is first known to have appeared in 1833 as the name of the Mexican land grant which included this creek and adjacent lands.

The first European land exploration of Alta California, the Spanish Portolà expedition, passed through the area on its way north, camping at one of the creeks on October 15, 1769. The expedition diaries don't provide enough information to be sure which creek it was, but the direction of travel was northwest, parallel to the coast. Franciscan missionary Juan Crespi, traveling with the expedition, noted in his diary that "We stopped on the bank of a small stream, which has about four varas of deep running water. It has on its banks a good growth of cottonwoods and alders; on account of the depth at which it runs it may be that it cannot be utilized to water some plains through which it runs." Translator Herbert Bolton speculated that the location was Soquel Creek.

Martina Castro was granted Rancho Soquel by Alta California governor José Figueroa in 1833. Martina was one of the daughters of Santa Cruz fundadore José Joaquín Castro, who came as a boy with his family to Alta California from Mexico with the second De Anza expedition in 1775. Several of Martina's Californio brothers and sisters also became rancheros.

The town of Soquel is notorious for its flooding. The lowlands in and around the Soquel Creek have flooded many times. The most recent flood was in January 1982, and it nearly topped its banks in 1986. Uncleared log jams downstream in the city of Capitola have been blamed for the flooding. Capitola City Planner Richard Steele implemented a debris removal program after the near flooding in 1986.

In 1965, Soquel was the location of the first "Acid Test" party.

== Geography ==
Soquel is located at 36°59′13″N 121°56′44″W (36.986991, -121.945636).

According to the United States Census Bureau, the CDP has a total area of 4.6 square miles (11.9 km^{2}), all land.

Soquel Creek flows through Soquel.

== Demographics ==
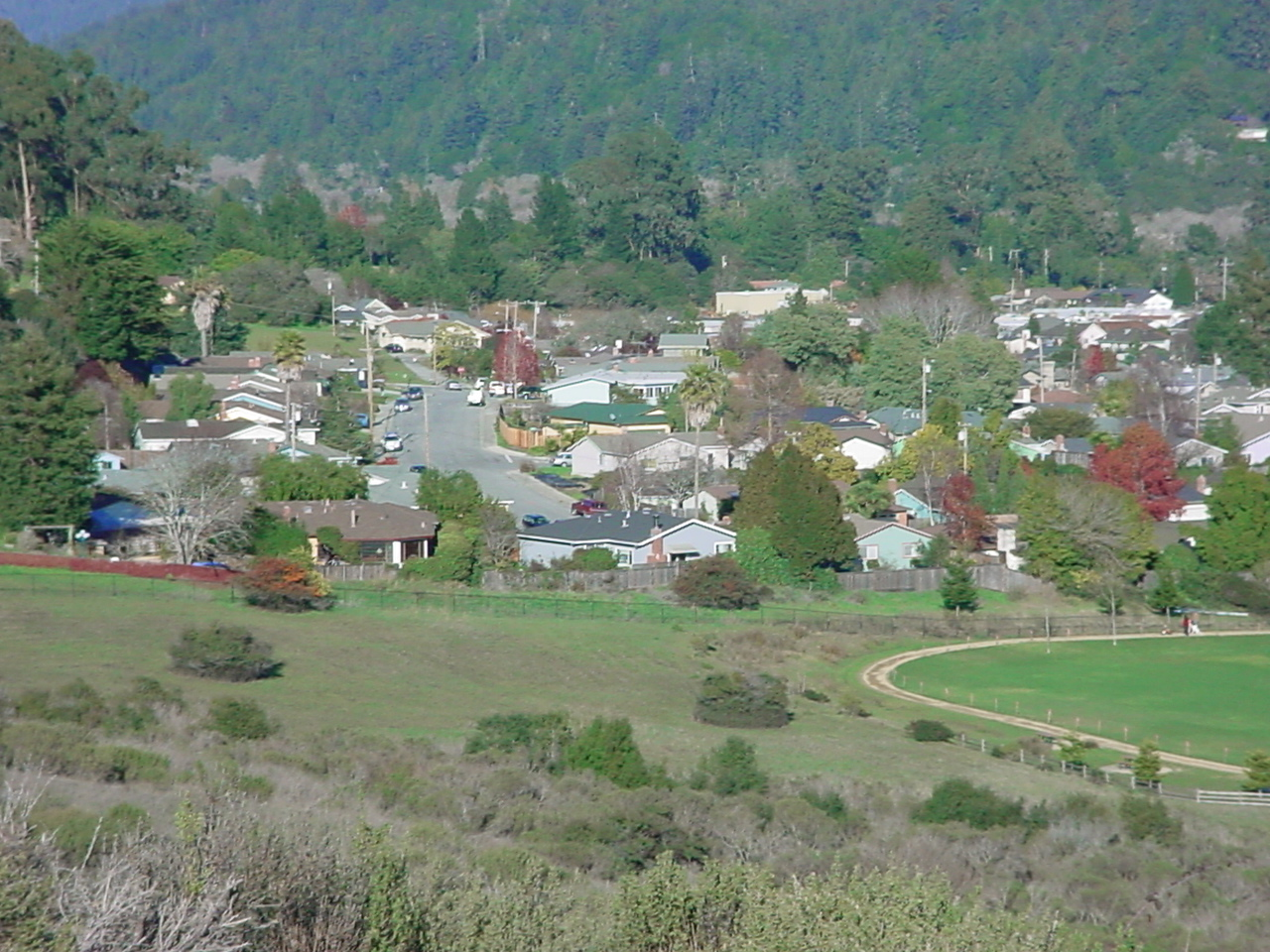
A residential neighborhood in Soquel

Historical population
Census	Pop.	Note	%±
1880	328		—
1890	2,982		809.1%
1900	2,987		0.2%
1970	5,795		—
1980	6,212		7.2%
1990	9,188		47.9%
2000	5,081		−44.7%
2010	9,644		89.8%
2020	9,980		3.5%
U.S. Decennial Census; 1860–1870 1880-1890; 1900 1910 1920; 1930 1940 1950; 1960 1970 1980; 1990 2000 2010; 2020

Soquel appeared as an unincorporated community in the 1970 U.S. census; and as a census-designated place in the 1980 United States census.

=== Racial and ethnic composition ===
Soquel CDP, California – Racial and ethnic composition Note: the US Census treats Hispanic/Latino as an ethnic category. This table excludes Latinos from the racial categories and assigns them to a separate category. Hispanics/Latinos may be of any race.
Race / Ethnicity (NH = Non-Hispanic)	Pop 2000	Pop 2010	Pop 2020	% 2000	% 2010	% 2020
White alone (NH)	3,909	7,205	6,952	76.93%	74.71%	69.66%
Black or African American alone (NH)	70	80	72	1.38%	0.83%	0.72%
Native American or Alaska Native alone (NH)	18	23	25	0.35%	0.24%	0.25%
Asian alone (NH)	197	341	376	3.88%	3.54%	3.77%
Native Hawaiian or Pacific Islander alone (NH)	8	16	5	0.16%	0.17%	0.05%
Other race alone (NH)	17	30	58	0.33%	0.31%	0.58%
Mixed race or Multiracial (NH)	151	343	552	2.97%	3.56%	5.53%
Hispanic or Latino (any race)	711	1,606	1,940	13.99%	16.65%	19.44%
Total	5,081	9,644	9,980	100.00%	100.00%	100.00%

=== 2020 census ===
As of the 2020 census, Soquel had a population of 9,980. The population density was 2,171.0 inhabitants per square mile (838.2/km^{2}). Racial and ethnic composition data are shown in the table above.

100.0% of residents lived in urban areas, and 0.0% lived in rural areas. The census reported that 98.3% of the population lived in households, 1.7% lived in non-institutionalized group quarters, and no one was institutionalized.

There were 3,943 households, out of which 25.0% included children under the age of 18, 48.2% were married-couple households, 6.1% were cohabiting couple households, 29.3% had a female householder with no partner present, and 16.4% had a male householder with no partner present. 27.7% of households were one person, and 16.6% were one person aged 65 or older. The average household size was 2.49. There were 2,515 families (63.8% of all households).

The age distribution was 17.6% under the age of 18, 7.1% aged 18 to 24, 23.2% aged 25 to 44, 28.8% aged 45 to 64, and 23.2% who were 65 years of age or older. The median age was 46.8 years. For every 100 females, there were 92.8 males, and for every 100 females age 18 and over there were 90.2 males.

There were 4,176 housing units at an average density of 908.4 units per square mile (350.7 units/km^{2}), of which 3,943 (94.4%) were occupied. Of these, 71.1% were owner-occupied, and 28.9% were occupied by renters. Of all housing units, 5.6% were vacant; the homeowner vacancy rate was 0.6%, and the rental vacancy rate was 3.0%.

=== Income and poverty ===
In 2023, the US Census Bureau estimated that the median household income was $114,991, and the per capita income was $60,478. About 1.2% of families and 6.4% of the population were below the poverty line.

=== 2010 census ===
At the 2010 census Soquel had a population of 9,644. The population density was 2,097.4 inhabitants per square mile (809.8/km^{2}). The racial makeup of Soquel was 7,898 (81.9%) White, 85 (0.9%) African American, 71 (0.7%) Native American, 356 (3.7%) Asian, 21 (0.2%) Pacific Islander, 693 (7.2%) from other races, and 520 (5.4%) from two or more races. Hispanic or Latino of any race were 1,606 persons (16.7%).

The census reported that 9,595 people (99.5% of the population) lived in households, 49 (0.5%) lived in non-institutionalized group quarters, and no one was institutionalized.

There were 3,912 households, 1,156 (29.6%) had children under the age of 18 living in them, 1,758 (44.9%) were opposite-sex married couples living together, 467 (11.9%) had a female householder with no husband present, 174 (4.4%) had a male householder with no wife present. There were 266 (6.8%) unmarried opposite-sex partnerships, and 39 (1.0%) same-sex married couples or partnerships. 1,128 households (28.8%) were one person and 411 (10.5%) had someone living alone who was 65 or older. The average household size was 2.45. There were 2,399 families (61.3% of households); the average family size was 3.00.

The age distribution was 1,942 people (20.1%) under the age of 18, 880 people (9.1%) aged 18 to 24, 2,215 people (23.0%) aged 25 to 44, 3,392 people (35.2%) aged 45 to 64, and 1,215 people (12.6%) who were 65 or older. The median age was 43.2 years. For every 100 females, there were 91.8 males. For every 100 females age 18 and over, there were 90.4 males.

There were 4,107 housing units at an average density of 893.2 per square mile, of the occupied units 2,750 (70.3%) were owner-occupied and 1,162 (29.7%) were rented. The homeowner vacancy rate was 1.4%; the rental vacancy rate was 2.4%. 6,654 people (69.0% of the population) lived in owner-occupied housing units and 2,941 people (30.5%) lived in rental housing units.

== Government ==
In the California State Legislature, Soquel is in the 17th senatorial district, represented by Democrat John Laird, and in the 30th Assembly district, represented by Democrat Dawn Addis.

In the United States House of Representatives, Soquel is in California's 19th congressional district, represented by Democrat Jimmy Panetta.

== Recreation ==
Anna Jean Cummings Park is the largest park in Soquel, with playfields for soccer, baseball, and softball, playgrounds, picnic areas, and a large open space of coastal prairie terrace. It is operated by the Santa Cruz County Parks Department. Recently completed in downtown Soquel, Heart of Soquel Park includes wooden walkways along Soquel Creek, bocce ball courts, and outdoor event spaces. Others include Richard Vessey, Soquel Lions, and Willowbrook Park. Based on a 1990 proposal, a park with a community center is under development on a property known as "The Farm". The Land Trust of Santa Cruz County also owns two protected lands on Fairway Drive, the Greenspace Garden and the Fairway Drive Coastal Prairie Terrace.
