= List of schools in Santa Cruz County, California =

This is a list of the schools in Santa Cruz County, California.

== Current public schools ==
School	District or agency	Grades served	Notes
DeWitt Anderson School	County Office of Education		Alternative school
Escuela Quetzal	County Office of Education		Alternative school
El Nido	County Office of Education		Alternative school
Lighthouse High School	County Office of Education		Alternative school
Loudon Nelson Community School	County Office of Education		Alternative school
Natural Bridges High School/Green Careers Center	County Office of Education		Alternative school
Oasis High School	County Office of Education		Alternative school
Ponderosa School	County Office of Education		Alternative school
Robert A. Hartman School	County Office of Education		Alternative school
San Lorenzo Valley Community School	County Office of Education		Alternative school
Santa Cruz Community School	County Office of Education		Alternative school
Seabright School	County Office of Education		Alternative school
Sequoia Schools	County Office of Education		
Star Community School	County Office of Education		Alternative school
Wagner Cottage	County Office of Education		Alternative school
Bonny Doon Elementary	Bonny Doon Union Elementary School District	K–6	
Happy Valley Elementary School	Happy Valley Union Elementary School District	K–6	
Del Mar Elementary School	Live Oak School District	K–5	
Green Acres Elementary School	Live Oak School District	K–5	
Live Oak Elementary School	Live Oak School District	K–5	
Ocean Alternative Education School	Live Oak School District	K–5	
Tierra Pacifica Charter School	Live Oak School District	K–8	
Shoreline Middle School	Live Oak School District	6–8	
Cypress Charter High School	County Office of Education	9–12	Alternative school
Mountain Elementary School	Mountain Elementary School District	K–6	
Pacific Elementary School	Pacific Elementary School District	K–6	
Alianza Elementary School	Pajaro Valley Unified School District	K–5	
Amesti Elementary School	Pajaro Valley Unified School District	K–5	
Ann Soldo Elementary School	Pajaro Valley Unified School District	K–5	
Bradley Elementary School	Pajaro Valley Unified School District	K–5	
Calabasas Elementary School	Pajaro Valley Unified School District	K–5	
Freedom Elementary School	Pajaro Valley Unified School District	K–5	
H.A. Hyde Elementary School	Pajaro Valley Unified School District	K–5	
Hall Elementary School	Pajaro Valley Unified School District	K–5	
Landmark Elementary School	Pajaro Valley Unified School District	K–5	
Linscott Charter School	Pajaro Valley Unified School District	K–5	
MacQuiddy Elementary School	Pajaro Valley Unified School District	K–5	
Mar Vista Elementary School	Pajaro Valley Unified School District	K–5	
Mintie White Elementary School	Pajaro Valley Unified School District	K–5	
Ohlone Elementary School	Pajaro Valley Unified School District	K–5	
Radcliff Elementary School	Pajaro Valley Unified School District	K–5	
Rio Del Mar Elementary School	Pajaro Valley Unified School District	K–5	
Starlight Elementary School	Pajaro Valley Unified School District	K–5	
Valencia Elementary School	Pajaro Valley Unified School District	K–5	
Academic Vocational Charter Institute	Pajaro Valley Unified School District	9–12	
Aptos High School	Pajaro Valley Unified School District	9–12	
Aptos Junior High School	Pajaro Valley Unified School District		
Duncan Holbert School	Pajaro Valley Unified School District		
E.A. Hall Middle School	Pajaro Valley Unified School District	6–8	
Lakeview Middle School	Pajaro Valley Unified School District	6–8	
New School	Pajaro Valley Unified School District		
Pacific Coast Charter School	Pajaro Valley Unified School District		
Pajaro Middle School	Pajaro Valley Unified School District	6–8	
Pajaro Valley High School	Pajaro Valley Unified School District	9–12	
Renaissance High School	Pajaro Valley Unified School District	9–12	
Rolling Hills Middle School	Pajaro Valley Unified School District	6–8	
Watsonville-Aptos Adult School	Pajaro Valley Unified School District		
Watsonville Charter School of the Arts	Pajaro Valley Unified School District	K–12	
Watsonville High School	Pajaro Valley Unified School District	9–12	
Boulder Creek Elementary School	San Lorenzo Valley Unified School District	K–5	
San Lorenzo Valley Elementary School	San Lorenzo Valley Unified School District	K–5	
San Lorenzo Valley Middle School	San Lorenzo Valley Unified School District	6–8	
San Lorenzo Valley High School	San Lorenzo Valley Unified School District	K–5	
Charter Program	San Lorenzo Valley Unified School District	K–12	SLV Homeschool (Title 1), K–12; Boulder Creek Homeschool (Title 3), K–6; Fall Creek Homeschool (Title 4), K–6; Coast Redwood Middle Homeschool (Title 5), 6–8; Coast Redwood High School (Title 8), 9–12; Nature Academy (Title 11), 6–8; Mountain Independent Studies (Title 72), K–6
Alternative Family Education	Santa Cruz City School District	K–12	
Bay View Elementary School	Santa Cruz City School District	K–5	
DeLaveaga Elementary School	Santa Cruz City School District	K–5	
Gault Elementary School	Santa Cruz City School District	K–5	
Monarch Community School	Santa Cruz City School District	K–5	
Westlake Elementary School	Santa Cruz City School District	K–5	
Ark Independent Studies	Santa Cruz City School District	9–12	
Branciforte Middle School	Santa Cruz City School District	6–8	
Costanoa Continuation School	Santa Cruz City School District	9–12	
Delta School	Santa Cruz City School District	9–12	Charter school
Harbor High School	Santa Cruz City School District	9–12	
Mission Hill Middle School	Santa Cruz City School District	6–8	
Santa Cruz Adult School	Santa Cruz City School District		
Santa Cruz High School	Santa Cruz City School District	9–12	
Soquel High School	Santa Cruz City School District	9–12	
Pacific Collegiate School	County Office of Education	7–12	Charter school
Brook Knoll Elementary School	Scotts Valley Unified School District	K–5	
Vine Hill Elementary School	Scotts Valley Unified School District	K–5	
Scotts Valley Middle School	Scotts Valley Unified School District	6–8	
Scotts Valley High School	Scotts Valley Unified School District	9–12	
Main Street Elementary School	Soquel Union Elementary School District	K–5	
Santa Cruz Gardens Elementary School	Soquel Union Elementary School District	K–5	
Soquel Elementary School	Soquel Union Elementary School District	K–5	
New Brighton Middle School	Soquel Union Elementary School District	6–8	

== Current private schools ==
School	District or agency	Grades served	Notes
Spring Hill School	Private	PreK–6	Formerly named Popper–Keizer School
Georgiana Bruce Kirby Preparatory School	Private	6–12	
Monte Vista Christian School	Private	6–12	
Monterey Bay Academy	Private	9–12	
Saint Francis Central Coast Catholic High School	Private	9–12	
Santa Cruz Waldorf School	Private	K–8	Also Santa Cruz Waldorf High School from 2003 to 2009.
The Bay School	Private	K–12	Special education
Monterey Coast Preparatory School	Private	6–12	Alternative school
Merit Academy	Private	K–12	
Green Valley Christian School	Private	K–12	
Mount Madonna School	Private	PreK–12	
Potter's House Community Christian School	Private	1–12	
Aptos Academy	Private	PreK–8	
Magic Apple School	Private	2–7	
Orchard School	Private	K–6	Alternative school
Santa Cruz Montessori	Private	PreK–8	Montessori school
Twin Lakes Christian School	Private	K–8	
Salesian Elementary and Junior High School	Private	K–8	
St Lawrence Academy	Private	K–7	
Good Shepherd Catholic School	Private	PreK–8	
Holy Cross School	Private	PreK–8	
New Horizons School	Private	K–5	Alternative
Santa Cruz Children's School	Private	K–6	
Seabright Montessori School	Private	K–5	
Baymonte Christian School	Private	K–8	
VHM Christian School	Private	K–8	
Tara Redwood School	Private	PreK–3	Montessori school
Green Valley Christian School	Private	K–12	
Mount Madonna School	Private	K–12	
Moreland Notre Dame School	Private	K–8	
Trinity Lutheran School	Private	K–3	
Chartwell School	Private	K–8	Specializes in students with specific learning differences
Gateway School	Private	K–8	
The New High School	Private	9–12	

== Former schools ==
School	District or agency	Grades served	Years	Notes
The Carden School of Santa Cruz	Private	K–6	Closed in June 2009	
Watsonville Primary	Public		1853 to 1924	First school building in 1864; before then, it met first in a church and then in the teacher's home.
