= Santa Cruz Coast Athletic League =

High school athletic league in California

Santa Cruz Coast Athletic League (SCCAL) a high school athletic conference part of the CIF Central Coast Section of the California Interscholastic Federation. It comprises high schools generally around Santa Cruz County, California. Not all schools participate in all sports.

== Members ==
- Aptos High School
- Harbor High School
- Mt. Madonna High School
- San Lorenzo Valley High School
- Santa Cruz High School
- Scotts Valley High School
- Saint Francis Central Coast Catholic High School
- Soquel High School
