= Santa Cruz City School District =

School district in California, United States

Location
- 133 Mission St; Santa Cruz, California 95060 United States

District information
- Grades: pre-K through 12
- Superintendent: Kris Munro

Students and staff
- Students: 7,000
- Teachers: 400
- Staff: 200

Other information
- Website: sccs.net

Santa Cruz City School District is a public school district in Santa Cruz County, California, United States. It serves 7,000 students in grades pre-K through 12, both within and outside the city of Santa Cruz. It comprises two districts, an elementary and a secondary district, governed by a single seven-member Board of Education.

The secondary school district has some areas where it serves grades 6-12 and others where it serves those only from grades 9-12. It also serves students from Bonny Doon School District, Happy Valley Elementary School District, Live Oak School District, Mountain School District, Pacific Elementary School District, and Soquel Union Elementary School District.

It also serves homeschooling programs and adult students, although it is considering whether to eliminate its adult education program for budgetary reasons.

The Santa Cruz City Elementary School District's four elementary schools are all significantly over capacity, leading the district to consider reclaiming and reopening a fifth elementary school that was leased to a charter school operator several years ago.

== List of Schools ==
=== Elementary Schools ===
- Bay View Elementary
- DeLaveaga Elementary
- Gault Elementary
- Monarch Elementary
- Westlake Elementary

=== Middle Schools ===
- Mission Hill Middle School
- Branciforte Middle School (or B40)

=== High Schools ===
- Santa Cruz High
- Harbor High
- Soquel High

=== Alternative Education ===
- Alternative Family Education (AFE)
- ARK Independent Studies
- Costanoa High
