= Scotts Valley High School =

Public high school in California, United States

Location
- 555 Glenwood Dr. Scotts Valley, California 95066; United States; 37°04′20″N 122°00′22″W

Information
- Type: Public
- Established: 1999
- School district: Scotts Valley Unified School District
- Superintendent: Micheline Miglis
- CEEB code: 053598
- Principal: Joe Allen
- Teaching staff: 43
- Grades: 9-12
- Enrollment: 655 (2023-2024)
  - Grade 9: 154
  - Grade 10: 137
  - Grade 11: 166
  - Grade 12: 153
- Student to teacher ratio: 19.33
- Education system: International Baccalaureate
- Language: English
- Schedule type: Block Schedule
- Campus type: Rural
- Colors: Maroon; Gold; Black
- Athletics conference: Santa Cruz Coast Athletic League
- Sports: Baseball, Basketball, Cheer, Cross Country, Flag Football, Football, Golf, Lacrosse, Soccer, Softball, Swimming, Tennis, Track & Field, Volleyball, and Wrestling
- Nickname: Falcons
- Rival: San Lorenzo Valley High School
- Accreditation: Western Association of Schools and Colleges (WASC)
- Newspaper: News From the Nest
- Website: svhs.scottsvalleyusd.org
- Last updated: April 24, 2025

Scotts Valley High School (SVHS) is a public high school located in Scotts Valley, California. It was founded in 1999 and is a part of the Scotts Valley Unified School District, which is in Santa Cruz County.

== Athletics ==
Scotts Valley High School sports include wrestling, swimming, cross country, baseball, football, basketball, lacrosse, tennis, soccer, volleyball, track and field, cheerleading, and softball. Scotts Valleys most recent National Championship came in 2013/14, when wrestler Dominique Parrish won the 116 lb. wrestling category. Their last State Championship came in 2014/15 when Parrish won the 116 lb. CIF State Championship in wrestling for the second year in a row, but came third in the Nationals for that year.

== Notable people ==
=== Alumni ===
- Dominique Parrish, World Champion wrestler
- Shane Carle, Major League Baseball pitcher
- Robbie Erlin, Major League Baseball pitcher

=== Faculty ===
- Joe Nedney, former NFL placekicker, assistant football coach
