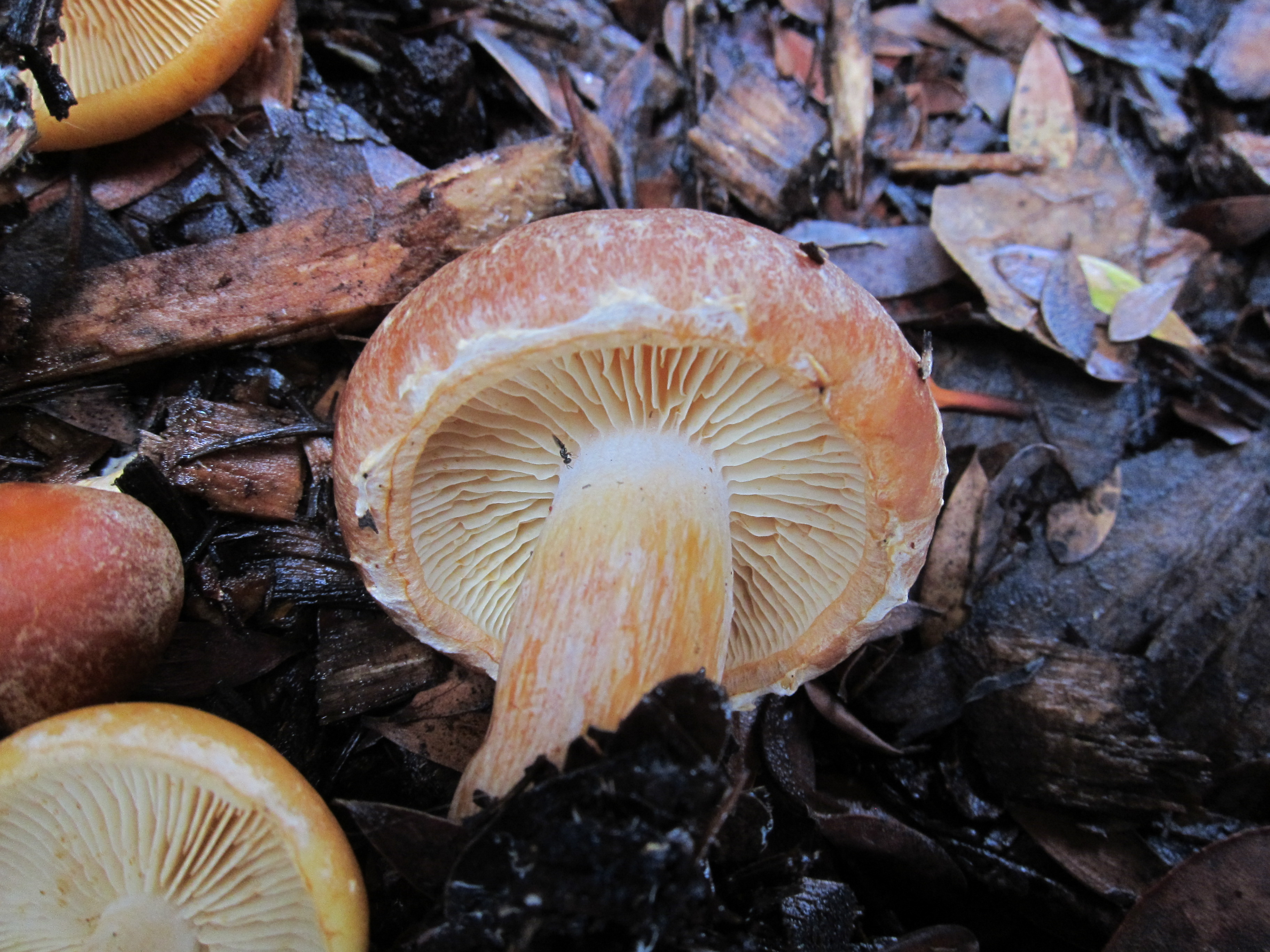
- Gymnopilus humicola, Live Oak, California, United States

Scientific classification
- Domain: Eukaryota
- Kingdom: Fungi
- Division: Basidiomycota
- Class: Agaricomycetes
- Order: Agaricales
- Family: Hymenogastraceae
- Genus: Gymnopilus
- Species: G. humicola

Binomial name
- Gymnopilus humicola Harding ex Singer

= Gymnopilus humicola =

Species of mushroom

Gymnopilus humicola Mycological characteristics
- Gills on hymenium
- Cap is convex
- Hymenium is adnexed or adnate
- Ecology is saprotrophic
- Edibility is inedible

Gymnopilus humicola is a species of mushroom in the family Hymenogastraceae.

== Description ==
The cap is 1 to 5 centimetres (0.4 to 2.0 in) in diameter. The species is inedible.

== Habitat and distribution ==
Gymnopilus humicola grows on humus, in both coniferous and deciduous woodland. It has been found in the US states of Michigan, Idaho, Tennessee, and Washington. It fruits from June to September.

== See also ==
List of Gymnopilus species
