= Ratboy (disambiguation) =

Ratboy is a 1986 American film.

Ratboy or Rat Boy may refer to:

- Jason "Ratboy" Collins (born 1974), American surfer
- Rat Boy (born 1996), a British Musician from Chelmsford, England
- Rat Boy, nickname of Yoshinari Ogawa (born 1966), Japanese professional wrestler
- Rat Boy, a character in Viz comics
- Ratboy or Anthony Kennedy (20th century), a juvenile delinquent who was a resident of Byker Wall in Newcastle upon Tyne, England
- A scene in The Simpsons episode Homer vs. Patty and Selma
- Ratboy and Ratboy Jr. is a musical duo consisting of Tim Sutton and Matty Senzatimore, based in New Paltz, New York. The two musicians have been performing together for more than 30 years.

== See also ==
- Ratboys, an American indie band
- Ratby, a village in Leicestershire, England
