= Marv Marinovich =

American football player and coach (1939–2020)

No. 68
- Position: Guard

Personal information
- Born: August 6, 1939; Watsonville, California, U.S.
- Died: December 3, 2020 (aged 81); Mission Viejo, California, U.S.
- Listed height: 6 ft 3 in (1.91 m)
- Listed weight: 250 lb (113 kg)

Career information
- High school: Watsonville (CA)
- College: Santa Monica CC (1958); USC (1959–1962)
- NFL draft: 1962: 12th round, 156th overall pick
- AFL draft: 1962: 28th round, 217th overall pick

Career history

Playing
- Los Angeles Rams (1963)*; Oakland Raiders (1965)
- * Offseason or practice squad member only

Coaching
- Oakland Raiders (1970) Assistant coach; The Hawaiians (1974-1975) Defensive line coach

Awards and highlights
- National champion (1962); First-team All-PCC (1962)

Career AFL statistics
- Games played: 1
- Stats at Pro Football Reference

Marvin Jack Marinovich (August 6, 1939 – December 3, 2020) was an American college and professional football player who became a strength and conditioning coach. He played college football as a two-way lineman for the USC Trojans and was captain of their national championship team in 1962. He played professionally as an offensive guard for the Oakland Raiders of the American Football League (AFL). He was later the founder of Marinovich Training Systems.

== Early life ==
Marv Marinovich grew up with his extended family on a three-thousand-acre (12 km²) ranch in Watsonville, in northern California. The area was owned by his Croatian grandfather, J. G. Marinovich, who had supposedly been in the Russian Army and overseen the battlefield amputation of his own arm. Marinovich attended Watsonville High School.

== College career ==
Marinovich went to Santa Monica College, where the team went undefeated and won the 1958 national junior-college championship. From there he transferred to the University of Southern California. While majoring in art at USC, Marinovich was a two-way lineman and a captain of the USC team that won the 1962 national championship; however, during the 1963 Rose Bowl he was ejected for fighting. Known for his passion, he was named Most Inspirational Player by his teammates. In college, he met his wife, Trudi (née Fertig), who was a Delta Gamma sorority girl at USC, and the sister of USC quarterback Craig Fertig; she dropped out of college after her sophomore year to marry Marinovich.

== Professional football career ==
Marinovich entered professional football during the era of NFL and AFL competitive drafts, and was drafted in the 12th round of the 1962 NFL draft by the Los Angeles Rams and in the 1962 AFL draft by the Oakland Raiders. After a disappointing three-year career, where he over-trained himself based on weight and bulk with little time for recovery, Marinovich left to focus on sports training.

== Strength and conditioning coach ==
Marinovich studied Eastern Bloc training methods and was hired by Oakland Raiders owner, Al Davis, as one of the NFL's first strength-and-conditioning coaches. Marinovich learned to focus more on training for speed and flexibility, and much of his work became the basis for modern core- and swimming-pool-based conditioning programs. He later worked for the MLB's St. Louis Cardinals, and then the Hawaiians of the World Football League. He eventually moved his young family in with his in-laws on the Balboa Peninsula of Newport Beach, California. He later opened his own athletic research center, and began applying the techniques to his children, Traci and Todd Marinovich, introducing sport training before they could leave the crib and continuing it throughout childhood and adolescence.

Todd Marinovich became a high school football legend, dominating all records in Orange County and coming to national attention when Sports Illustrated published an article, titled "Bred To Be A Superstar", that discussed his unique upbringing under his father who wanted to turn his son into the "perfect quarterback". The article declared Marinovich "America's first test-tube athlete", and mentioned his mother took him to museums, played him classical music and jazz while banning cartoons as too violent and instead viewing films by Alfred Hitchcock. Marv Marinovich had assembled a team of advisers to tutor him on every facet of the game. In a noted passage, the article described that:

He has never eaten a Big Mac or an Oreo or a Ding Dong. When he went to birthday parties as a kid, he would take his own cake and ice cream to avoid sugar and refined white flour. He would eat homemade catsup, prepared with honey. He did consume beef but not the kind injected with hormones. He ate only unprocessed dairy products. He teethed on frozen kidney. When Todd was one month old, Marv was already working on his son's physical conditioning. He stretched his hamstrings. Pushups were next. Marv invented a game in which Todd would try to lift a medicine ball onto a kitchen counter. Marv also put him on a balance beam. Both activities grew easier when Todd learned to walk. There was a football in Todd's crib from day one. "Not a real NFL ball," says Marv. "That would be sick; it was a stuffed ball."

Because of his strict upbringing and almost mechanical lifestyle under his father, some nicknamed him the "Robo QB." Todd Marinovich went on to have a solid career at USC, but began to show signs of emotional rebellion against his strict upbringing under his father; by the time he entered the NFL as a first round draft pick, he soon became a major bust due to personal issues. As a result, an ESPN columnist named the elder Marinovich one of history's "worst sports fathers."

In 1997 Marinovich started training athletes privately. Among his clintele were athletes such as Steve Finley, Jason Sehorn, Tyson Chandler and Troy Polamalu. In 2003 together with Biomedical expert Gavin MacMillan they founded SportsLab gym in Rancho Santa Margarita, California with MacMillan as owner and president and Marinovich as head coach. In 2003 Marinovich together with chiropractor Edythe Heus, wrote and published ProBodX: Proper Body Exercise – A sum of the research and experience in the unique strength and conditioning program.

In 2008 the gym name changed to Sport Science Lab (SSL) and was located at San Juan Capistrano, California. Under Sports Science Lab, Marinovich's unique training system was called the Neuromuscular Intensification System. At some point between 2008–2010 Marinovich stopped being associated with SSL.

In May 2009, Marinovich became the strength and conditioning coach for MMA fighter B.J. Penn for his August 8 title defense against Kenny Florian, at UFC 101 in the main event. Penn defeated Florian by a rear naked choke at 3:54 of the 4th round to retain the UFC lightweight title, and then following with another win against Diego Sanchez via 5th-round TKO due to a cut.

In late 2011, Marv Marinovich along with his brother Gary trained either at Integrated Martial Sciences Academy (IMS Academy) in Live Oak, Santa Cruz County, California or at Noble-Moreno Boxing Gym in Watsonville, California. His training program is known as Marinovich Training Systems.

== Personal life and later years ==
Marinovich was the father of Todd Marinovich, Mikhail Marinovich, and Traci Marinovich Grove. Todd and Traci's mother is Trudi Marinovich, and Mikhail's mother is Jan Crawford. His brother-in-law was Craig Fertig, who was also a former USC football player.

In 2018, the Marinovich family revealed that Marv Marinovich had been diagnosed with Alzheimer's disease and was living at a care facility in Mission Viejo, California. Marinovich died on December 3, 2020, in Mission Viejo, California. He was 81 years old.
