= Sherman Cocroft =

American football player (born 1961)

No. 22, 20, 25
- Position: Cornerback

Personal information
- Born: August 29, 1961 (age 65); Watsonville, California, U.S.
- Listed height: 6 ft 1 in (1.85 m)
- Listed weight: 195 lb (88 kg)

Career information
- High school: Watsonville
- College: San Jose State
- NFL draft: 1984: undrafted

Career history
- Seattle Seahawks (1984)*; Kansas City Chiefs (1985–1987); Buffalo Bills (1988); Tampa Bay Buccaneers (1989); Detroit Lions (1990)
- * Offseason or practice squad member only

Awards and highlights
- San Jose State Hall of Fame class of 1990

Career NFL statistics
- Interceptions: 7
- Fumble recoveries: 5
- Safeties: 1
- Stats at Pro Football Reference

Sherman Carlos Cocroft (born August 29, 1961) is an American former professional football player who was a defensive back in the National Football League (NFL). He played college football for the San Jose State Spartans.

== Early life ==
Cocroft played high school football at Watsonville High School.

== College career ==
Cocroft played college football at San José State University. Prior to that he played at Cabrillo College.

== Professional career ==
Cocroft played for the National Football League's Kansas City Chiefs, Buffalo Bills and Tampa Bay Buccaneers between 1985 and 1989.
