= Pajaro Valley Unified School District =

School district in California

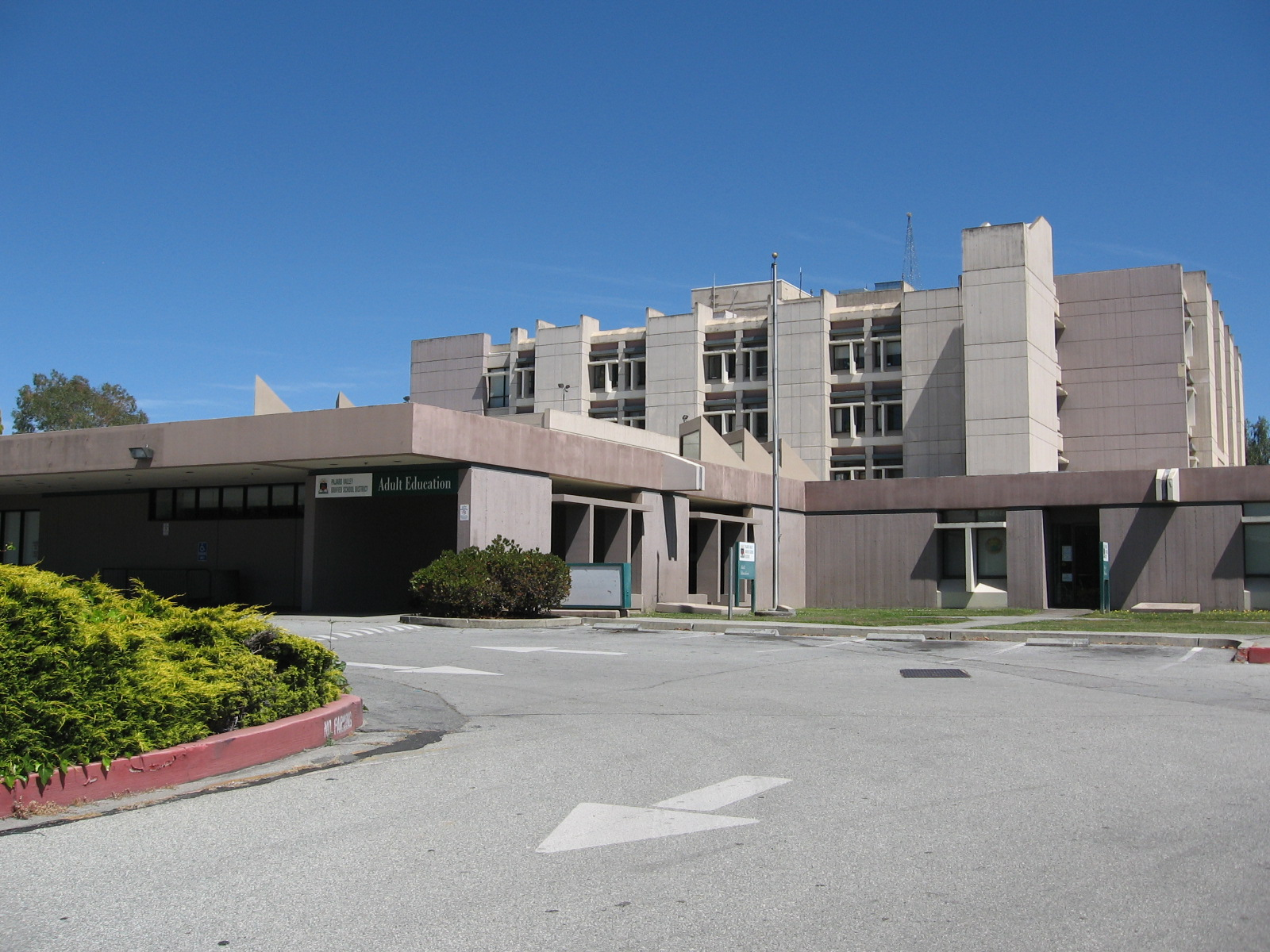
- Pajaro Valley Unified School District offices

Address
- 294 Green Valley Road Watsonville, California, 95076; United States

District information
- Type: Public
- Grades: K–12
- NCES District ID: 0629490

Students and staff
- Students: 18,743 (2020–2021)
- Teachers: 862.6 (FTE)
- Staff: 1,552.46 (FTE)
- Student–teacher ratio: 21.73:1

Other information
- Website: www.pvusd.net

Pajaro Valley Unified School District is a school district based in Watsonville, California, USA. The Superintendent is Heather Contreras. The District is overseen by a seven members of the board of trustees that meets an average of twice a month.

== Boundary ==
Pajaro Valley serves the eastern half of Santa Cruz County, a portion of northern Monterey County and a small section of San Benito County. The communities located within the district are the city of Watsonville and the CDPs of Amesti, Aptos, Aptos Hills-Larkin Valley, Aromas, Corralitos, Day Valley, Freedom, Interlaken, La Selva Beach, Los Lomas, Pajaro, Pajaro Dunes, Prunedale, Rio del Mar and Seacliff.

== Schools ==
=== Central Zone ===
- Amesti Elementary School
- Calabasas Elementary School
- Freedom Elementary School
- H.A. Hyde Elementary School
- Landmark Elementary School
- Starlight Elementary School
- Cesar Chavez Middle School
- Lakeview Middle School
- Rolling Hills Middle School
- Pajaro Valley High School

=== North Zone ===
- Bradley Elementary School
- Mar Vista Elementary School
- Rio Del Mar Elementary School
- Valencia Elementary School
- Aptos Junior High
- Aptos High School

=== South Zone ===
- Ann Soldo Elementary School
- Hall District Elementary School
- Mintie White Elementary School
- MacQuiddy Elementary School
- Ohlone Elementary School
- Radcliff Elementary School
- E.A. Hall Middle School
- Pajaro Middle School
- Watsonville High School
- Virtual Academy [Online based at Watsonville High School]
