= Jeremy Green =

American sports journalist (born 1971)

Jeremy Green (born July 21, 1971) is a former sports columnist and NFL studio analyst who last worked for ESPN, where among other things he hosted the daily American football podcast Football Today. Green was removed indefinitely from the Football Today podcast due to what has been cited as personal reasons.

Green is the son of former Minnesota Vikings and Arizona Cardinals head coach Dennis Green. He graduated from Santa Cruz High School in 1989. He formerly worked as a scout for several National Football League teams and director of pro personnel for the Cleveland Browns.

On July 8, 2010, while staying at the Holiday Inn Express in Bristol, Connecticut Green was arrested for possession of child pornography, possession of narcotics and possession of drug paraphernalia - an unspecified amount of cocaine. He was in custody on $750,000 cash bail. The arrest warrant stated that Green sent the undercover officer "17 pictures of a toddler, two videos of a toddler and one video of an 8-year-old girl." Following his arrest, an ESPN spokesman said Green was no longer employed by ESPN. On July 20, 2010, Green pleaded not guilty to the charges. On February 11, 2011, he pleaded guilty to possession of child pornography. He was extradited to Missouri and pleaded guilty to two counts of promoting child pornography in the second degree on December 1, 2011, for which he received a five-year concurrent sentence. He was released in May 2016.
