= San Lorenzo Valley High School =

Location
- 7105 Hwy 9 Felton, Santa Cruz County, California 95018; United States; 37.062515422749996°N 122.08169891215678°W

Information
- Type: Public
- Established: 1954; 72 years ago
- School district: San Lorenzo Valley Unified School District
- Superintendent: Christopher Schiermeyer
- Principal: Jeff Calden
- Teaching staff: 29.12 (FTE)
- Grades: 9-12
- Enrollment: 537 (2025-2026)
- Student to teacher ratio: 21.36
- Campus: Rural
- Colors: Red and Black
- Athletics conference: Santa Cruz Coast Athletic League; CIF Central Coast Section
- Mascot: Cougars
- National ranking: 2106
- Website: hs.slvusd.org//

San Lorenzo Valley High School (abbreviated as SLVHS) is a WASC-accredited public high school located in Felton, California, United States, that serves grades 9-12 for San Lorenzo Valley Unified School District.

== History ==
The original school building, known as the Boulder Creek School, was built in 1905 and rebuilt in 1906 after the 1906 San Francisco Earthquake. It was renamed to San Lorenzo Valley High during 1947. The current location opened in 1954 in Felton, serving the entire San Lorenzo Valley.

In the 1980's, the school built a room for students to chew tobacco at designated times to reduce the number of cigarette butts behind the boy's gymnasium.

The San Lorenzo Valley Unified School District consolidated several local educational programs serving communities throughout the valley during the twentieth century. Following rapid population growth after World War II, a new high school campus was established in Felton in 1954 to accommodate increasing enrollment.

== Campus ==
The campus is located in Felton, California, and serves students from communities throughout the San Lorenzo Valley, including Boulder Creek, Ben Lomond, Brookdale, and Felton. The school includes academic buildings, athletic facilities, performing arts spaces, and career technical education programs.

== Education ==
=== Rankings ===
According to the U.S. News & World Report Best High Schools rankings, San Lorenzo Valley High School was ranked #2,106 nationally and #339 among California high schools. U.S. News reported an Advanced Placement participation rate of 51%, a graduation rate of 95%, and an overall score of 88.26 out of 100.

=== Academics ===
San Lorenzo Valley High School offers a college-preparatory curriculum that includes Advanced Placement (AP) courses in mathematics, science, English, social studies, world languages, computer science, and visual arts. Students may take AP examinations in a variety of subjects as part of the school's academic program.

=== Demographics ===
San Lorenzo Valley High School enrolled 622 students during the 2023–24 school year. According to the California Department of Education, 1.8% of students were classified as English language learners.

According to U.S. News & World Report, 20% of students were economically disadvantaged.

== Music program ==
San Lorenzo Valley High School maintains instrumental and choral music programs that include concert band, jazz band, wind ensemble, and choir. Student musicians regularly perform at community events and regional festivals.

The school's music program is supported by the San Lorenzo Valley Music Boosters, a nonprofit organization that provides scholarships, fundraising support, and assistance with competitions, travel, and music education programs throughout the district.

Since 2022, student musicians have participated in the annual SLV Music & Art Festival at Roaring Camp Railroads in Felton, a community event featuring performances by musical ensembles from throughout the San Lorenzo Valley Unified School District.

In 2025, student performers from the school's choir, concert band, jazz band, and wind ensemble prepared for a performance tour of Leipzig, Vienna, and Prague.

== Theatre ==
San Lorenzo Valley High School maintains a theatre program that stages plays and musical productions in the school's Performing Arts Center. The program is supported by the SLV Theatre Boosters, a nonprofit organization that assists with productions, fundraising, scholarships, and theatre-related enrichment activities.

The theatre department regularly presents student-directed productions and full-scale musicals. Recent productions have included The Comedy of Terrible Errors (2023), Disney's Beauty and the Beast (2024), and Mamma Mia! (2026).

== Athletics ==
San Lorenzo Valley High School's athletic teams are known as the Cougars. The school competes in the Santa Cruz Coast Athletic League (SCCAL) and is a member of the California Interscholastic Federation (CIF) Central Coast Section.

The school sponsors a variety of interscholastic athletic programs. San Lorenzo Valley High School maintains an Athletic Hall of Fame, which recognizes athletes, coaches, and supporters who have made significant contributions to the school's athletic program.

== Facilities ==
San Lorenzo Valley High School is located in Felton, California, and serves students from communities throughout the San Lorenzo Valley. The campus includes academic buildings, athletic facilities, and a Performing Arts Center (PAC), which serves as a venue for concerts, theatrical productions, assemblies, and other school events.

The Performing Arts Center hosts events for the school's music and theatre programs, including concerts, plays, and musical productions.

== Notable alumni ==
- Jordan Beck, NFL player for the Atlanta Falcons and Denver Broncos
- Tyler Gilbert, MLB pitcher for the Arizona Diamondbacks
- Casey Gwinn, City Attorney of San Diego, CA from 1996 through 2004
- Andy Levitre, NFL player for the Tennessee Titans and Atlanta Falcons
- Herbert Mullin, American serial killer
