= Andy Levitre =

American football player (born 1986)

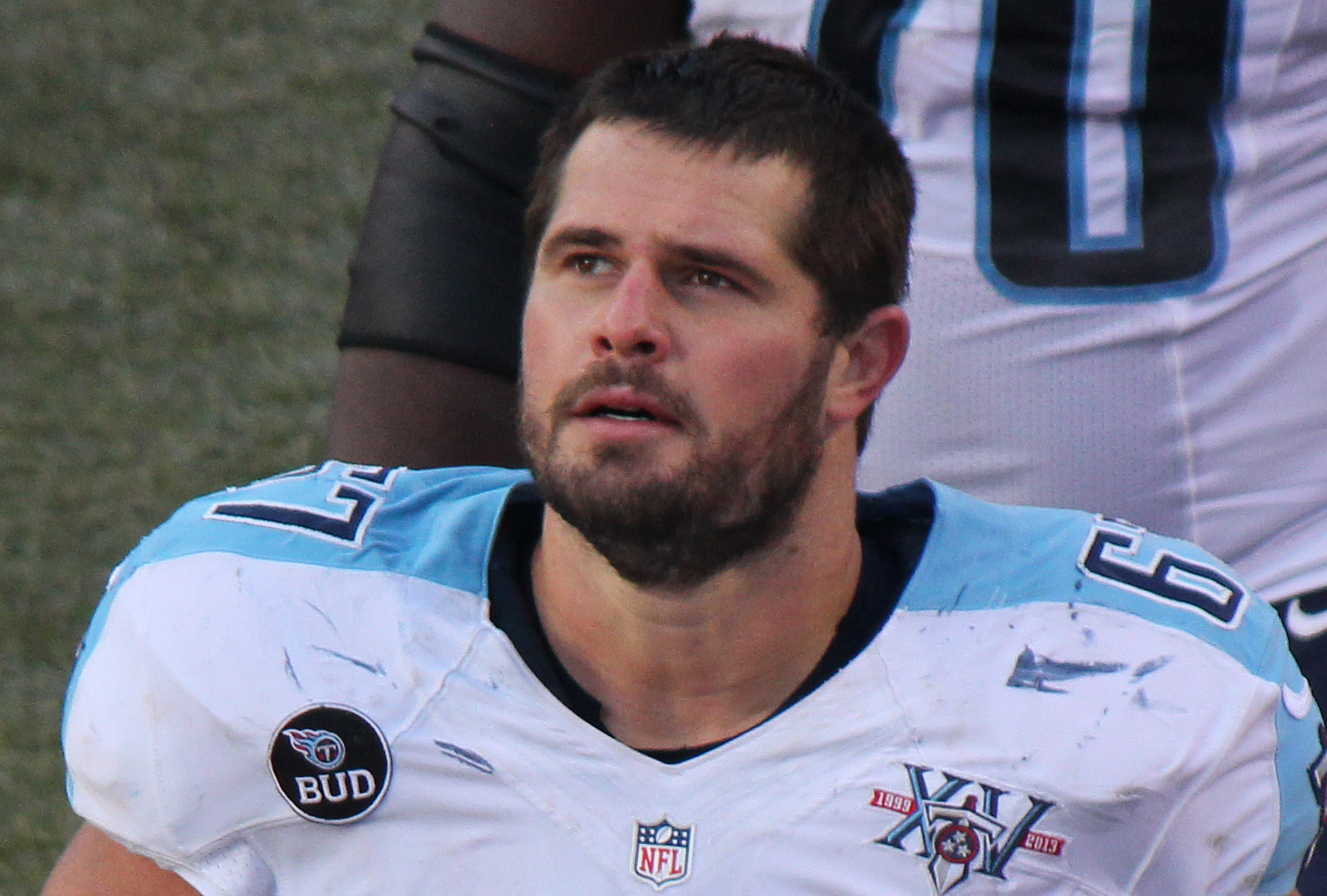
- Levitre with the Tennessee Titans in 2013

No. 67
- Position: Guard

Personal information
- Born: May 15, 1986 (age 40); Los Gatos, California, U.S.
- Listed height: 6 ft 2 in (1.88 m)
- Listed weight: 303 lb (137 kg)

Career information
- High school: San Lorenzo Valley (Felton, California)
- College: Oregon State (2004–2008)
- NFL draft: 2009: 2nd round, 51st overall pick

Career history
- Buffalo Bills (2009–2012); Tennessee Titans (2013–2014); Atlanta Falcons (2015–2018)

Awards and highlights
- PFWA All-Rookie Team (2009); First-team All-American (2008); First-team All-Pac-10 (2008); Second-team All-Pac-10 (2007)

Career NFL statistics
- Games played: 143
- Games started: 143
- Stats at Pro Football Reference

Andrew Steven Levitre (/ləˈviːtri/ lə-VEE-tree; born May 15, 1986) is an American former professional football player who was an offensive guard in the National Football League (NFL). He played college football for the Oregon State Beavers and was selected by the Buffalo Bills in the second round of the 2009 NFL draft. He also played in the NFL for the Tennessee Titans and Atlanta Falcons.

== Early life ==
Levitre played high school football at San Lorenzo Valley High School in Felton, California, where he was a two-way lineman. In his junior season, he recorded 47 tackles, two quarterback sacks and two fumble recoveries. He added more than 60 tackles and three sacks in his senior year.

Considered only a two-star recruit by both Rivals.com and Scout.com, Levitre was not ranked among the nation's top offensive line prospects in 2004. He chose Oregon State over LSU, Fresno State, and Arizona, where his older brother, Erick, played center (2002–2006).

== College career ==
Levitre redshirted in 2004, and played in all 11 games as a redshirt-freshman in 2005, while starting against Oregon. In his sophomore season, he started in game four of the season after senior starter Josh Linehan injured a knee in game three against Idaho. Levitre earned Pac-10 Honorable Mention as a player and academically.

During his junior year, Levitre started every game at either right or left tackle, and earned Pac-10 Conference second-team honors as selected by the coaches. For his senior season he was named to the 2008 Outland Trophy watch list, and started all 13 games at left tackle. He registered a career-high 91 knockdowns and 14 touchdown-resulting blocks and was earned All-American status by the American Football Coaches Association and Pro Football Weekly. He was considered the most-decorated Beaver offensive lineman since John Didion, a consensus All-America choice in the late 1960s.

== Professional career ==
=== Pre-draft ===
Alongside Duke Robinson and T. J. Lang, Levitre was considered one of the best guards available in the 2009 NFL draft. He has been compared to Todd Herremans by The Sporting News, and to Josh Beekman by CBS Sports.

Pre-draft measurables
Height	Weight	40-yard dash	10-yard split	20-yard split	20-yard shuttle	Vertical jump	Broad jump	Bench press
6 ft 2 1/2 in (1.89 m)	305 lb (138 kg)	5.33 s	1.78 s	3.03 s	4.52 s	30 1/2 in (0.77 m)	8 ft 7 in (2.62 m)	23 reps
All values from NFL Combine

=== Buffalo Bills ===
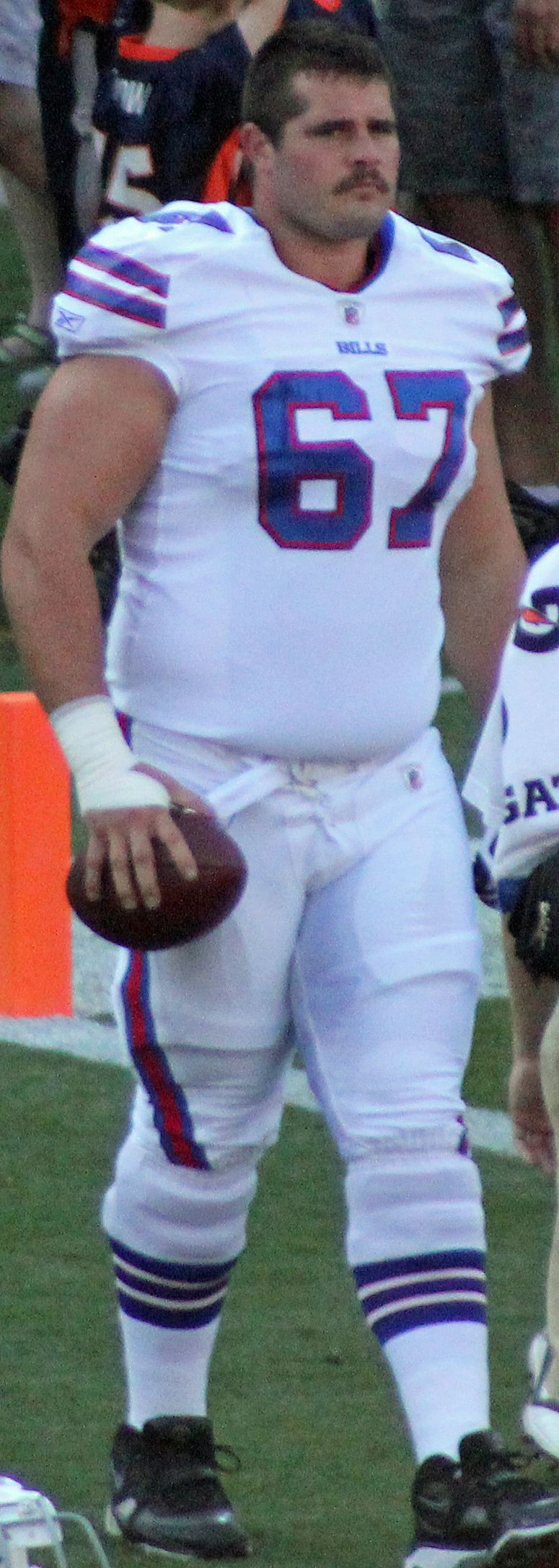
Levitre in 2011.

Levitre was selected by the Buffalo Bills with the 51st pick overall in the second round of the 2009 NFL draft, and was the first college guard drafted. He is the sixth selection from Oregon State in Bills history, the first since Keith Ellison in 2006. Counted on to start at left guard, Levitre joined a completely retooled offensive line that was expected to feature two rookie starters—him, and first round pick Eric Wood at right guard—and no players returning at the same position. He started all 16 games in 2009.

On January 15, 2010, Levitre was named to the 2009 NFL All-Rookie team along with teammate Jairus Byrd.

=== Tennessee Titans ===
On March 12, 2013, Levitre reached a six-year $46.8 million deal with the Tennessee Titans. Levitre underwent arthroscopic knee surgery in January 2013 and still felt knee soreness just days after signing for the team.

=== Atlanta Falcons ===
On September 4, 2015, the Titans traded Levitre to the Atlanta Falcons for a 2016 sixth round draft pick.

In the 2016 season, Levitre and the Falcons reached Super Bowl LI, where they faced the New England Patriots on February 5, 2017. In the Super Bowl, the Falcons fell in a 34–28 overtime defeat.

In 2017, Levitre started the first 12 games of the season at left guard before suffering a triceps injury. He missed the next three games before returning in Week 17 against the Carolina Panthers, where he aggravated the injury. He was placed on injured reserve on January 2, 2018.

On September 18, 2018, Levitre was placed on injured reserve after suffering a torn triceps.

On May 14, 2019, Levitre announced his retirement from the NFL after 10 seasons.
