= Watsonville High School =

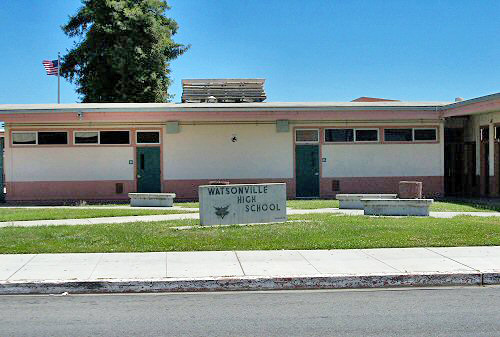

Location
- 250 E. Beach Street Watsonville; Watsonville, California 95060

Information
- Type: Public
- Established: 1892
- School district: Pajaro Valley Unified School District
- Principal: Joseph Gregorio
- Teaching staff: 102.82 (FTE)
- Grades: 9–12
- Enrollment: 2,244 (2022–2023)
- Student to teacher ratio: 21.82
- Color(s): Black and gold
- Athletics: Football, Cross Country, Tennis, Golf, Cheer, Volleyball, Basketball, Soccer, Wrestling, Baseball, Softball, Swimming, Track and Field, Lacrosse
- Mascot: Willy the Wildcat
- Rival: North County
- Website: https://www.watsonvillehs.net/index.html

Watsonville High School is a high school located in Watsonville, Santa Cruz County, California, and is part of the Pajaro Valley Unified School District. The school mascot is Willy the Wildcat. The school colors are black and gold. Watsonville High School is a large school with over 2,000 students and staff, making it the largest school in the Pajaro Valley Unified School District.

== History ==
Watsonville High School was originally a two-year high school course which was connected to a grammar school. The program met the standard for college entry requirements, as well as teaching Latin and Greek. In 1891, the course was extended to three years. There was an increased need for a separate building, so the district passed a bond measure to build a new two-story building, designed by W.H. Weeks, on the corner of Third and Marchant Streets.

On November 8, 1901, seven years after it was built, the school building was destroyed in a fire. In December, a second bond measure was proposed to rebuild the school, but it failed. In February, the school district was able to pass a smaller bond to hire Weeks to build a "Spanish style" school on the foundations of the original building.

== Sports ==
Their most recent sports rival is with Pajaro Valley High School, which is also located in Watsonville. Watsonville High's long-time rival is Aptos High School; the football game between the two schools is known as the "Black and Blue Bowl." A new rival in many sports, is North Monterey County High School.

- Baseball
- Basketball
- Cross Country
- Fall Cheer
- Football
- Golf
- Lacrosse
- Soccer
- Softball
- Swimming and Diving
- Tennis
- Track and Field
- Volleyball
- Winter Cheer
- Wrestling

== Notable alumni ==
- Luis Alejo, State Assemblymember (2010– )
- Brenda Buttner, Fox News host
- Sherman Cocroft, NFL player
- Mark Eichhorn, MLB player
- Marv Marinovich, NFL player
- Tlaloc Rivas, theatre director and professor
- Simon Salinas, State Assemblymember (2000–2006)
- Ken Sears, NBA player
