= Pajaro Dunes, California =

Pajaro Dunes
- census-designated place
- Position in California.
- Coordinates: 36°52′06″N 121°48′21″W
- Country: United States
- State: California
- County: Santa Cruz

Area
  - Total: 2.588 sq mi (6.703 km^{2})
  - Land: 2.564 sq mi (6.641 km^{2})
  - Water: 0.024 sq mi (0.063 km^{2}) 0.93%
- Elevation: 13 ft (4.0 m)

Population (2020)
  - Total: 122
  - Density: 47.6/sq mi (18.4/km^{2})
- Time zone: UTC-8 (Pacific (PST))
  - Summer (DST): UTC-7 (PDT)
- GNIS feature ID: 2583104

Pajaro Dunes is a census-designated place (CDP) in Santa Cruz County, California, United States. Pajaro Dunes is situated at an elevation of 13 feet (4.0 m) above sea level. The 2020 United States census reported Pajaro Dunes' population was 122.

== Geography ==
According to the United States Census Bureau, the CDP covers an area of 2.6 square miles (6.7 km^{2}), of which 99.07% is land and 0.93% is water.

== Demographics ==
Historical population
Census	Pop.	Note	%±
2010	144		—
2020	122		−15.3%
U.S. Decennial Census; 2010

Pajaro Dunes first appeared as a census designated place in the 2010 U.S. census.

=== Racial and ethnic composition ===
Pajaro Dunes CDP, California – Racial and ethnic composition Note: the US Census treats Hispanic/Latino as an ethnic category. This table excludes Latinos from the racial categories and assigns them to a separate category. Hispanics/Latinos may be of any race.
Race / Ethnicity (NH = Non-Hispanic)	Pop 2010	Pop 2020	% 2010	% 2020
White alone (NH)	81	69	56.25%	56.56%
Black or African American alone (NH)	0	0	0.00%	0.00%
Native American or Alaska Native alone (NH)	0	0	0.00%	0.00%
Asian alone (NH)	5	6	3.47%	4.92%
Native Hawaiian or Pacific Islander alone (NH)	0	0	0.00%	0.00%
Other race alone (NH)	3	0	2.08%	0.00%
Mixed race or Multiracial (NH)	1	1	0.69%	0.82%
Hispanic or Latino (any race)	54	46	37.50%	37.70%
Total	144	122	100.00%	100.00%

=== 2020 census ===
The 2020 United States census reported that Pajaro Dunes had a population of 122. The population density was 47.6 inhabitants per square mile (18.4/km^{2}). The racial makeup of Pajaro Dunes was 71 (58.2%) White, 0 (0.0%) African American, 0 (0.0%) Native American, 8 (6.6%) Asian, 0 (0.0%) Pacific Islander, 37 (30.3%) from other races, and 6 (4.9%) from two or more races. Hispanic or Latino of any race were 46 persons (37.7%).

The whole population lived in households. There were 61 households, out of which 11 (18.0%) had children under the age of 18 living in them, 28 (45.9%) were married-couple households, 3 (4.9%) were cohabiting couple households, 20 (32.8%) had a female householder with no partner present, and 10 (16.4%) had a male householder with no partner present. 22 households (36.1%) were one person, and 17 (27.9%) were one person aged 65 or older. The average household size was 2.0. There were 35 families (57.4% of all households).

The age distribution was 15 people (12.3%) under the age of 18, 11 people (9.0%) aged 18 to 24, 36 people (29.5%) aged 25 to 44, 21 people (17.2%) aged 45 to 64, and 39 people (32.0%) who were 65 years of age or older. The median age was 42.0 years. There were 65 males and 57 females.

There were 564 housing units at an average density of 220.0 units per square mile (84.9 units/km^{2}), of which 61 (10.8%) were occupied. Of these, 58 (95.1%) were owner-occupied, and 3 (4.9%) were occupied by renters.
