= Jason Collins (surfer) =

American aerial surfer (born 1974)

Jason "Ratboy" Collins
Personal information
- Born: July 4, 1974 (age 52) Santa Cruz, California, U.S.
- Years active: 1980–present
- Height: 5 ft 9 in (175 cm)
- Weight: 135 lb (61 kg)
- Website: https://www.fishedandforaged.com/

Surfing career
- Sport: Surfing
- Sponsors: Salty Crew, Santa Cruz Surfboards, Smith Optics, Reeds Ginger Brew, Fished and Foraged.
- Major achievements: (1999 & 2000) 1st Surfing Magazine Airshow Series, (2001) 1st Vans Airshow Series,

Surfing specifications
- Stance: Regular (natural) foot
- Quiver: 5'6", 5'8", 5'10" to 10'2"
- Favorite waves: Steamer Lane, Mitchells, Stockton Ave, Cowells (Santa Cruz)

Jason "Ratboy" Collins (born July 4, 1974, in Santa Cruz, CA) is an aerial surfer. He graduated from Santa Cruz High School. Collins took part in aerial surfing in the mid-nineties, as did surfers like Christian Fletcher. He is a long boarder and is known for his overall riding style.

Collins was the first to land a backside 360 air during the Expression Session at the O'Neill Cold Water Classic in 1994. Collins has a line of signature surfboards with the Stretch label.

== Citations ==
- "Christian Fletcher Gallery | Landscape Photography Art Gallery". Christian Fletcher Gallery.
