= Bonny Doon Union Elementary School District =

School district in California, United States

Bonny Doon Union Elementary

Location
- 1492 Pine Flat Rd. Santa Cruz, California 95060 United States

Other information
- Website: www.bonnydoon.santacruz.k12.ca.us

Bonny Doon Union Elementary is a public school district based in Santa Cruz County, California, United States.
