= Mountain Elementary School District =

School district in California, United States

Location
- 3042 Old San Jose Rd. Soquel, California 95073 United States

Other information
- Website: www.mountainesd.org

Mountain Elementary School District is a public school district based in Santa Cruz County, California, United States.
