= Scotts Valley Unified School District =

School district in California

Location
- Santa Cruz County, California; United States
- Coordinates: 37°02′33″N 122°01′39″W

District information
- Type: Public school district
- Grades: K to 12
- Superintendent: Tanya Krause
- School board: Scotts Valley Unified School District Board of Trustees
- Budget: US$19.2 million (2007-08)
- NCES District ID: 0600043

Students and staff
- Enrollment: 2,237 (2020-2021)
- Faculty: 98.80 (on FTE basis)
- Student–teacher ratio: 22.64

Other information
- Website: www.scottsvalleyusd.org

The Scotts Valley Unified School District is a public school district located in Santa Cruz County, California, U.S. which operates four schools educating about 2,700 students.

== History ==
In 2003 San Lorenzo Valley Unified School District gave territory to Scotts Valley Unified School District.

== Schools ==
The Scotts Valley Unified School District operates four public schools: Scotts Valley High School (grades 9 to 12), Scotts Valley Middle School (grades 6 to 8), and two elementary schools: Vine Hill School (grades Kindergarten to 5) and Brook Knoll School. They also operate an Independent Study/Home School program. Together these schools serve more than 2,600 students each year.

Each of these elementary schools is ranked among the best in California.

Scotts Valley Middle School was formed in 1941 by the Works Progress Administration. Scotts Valley High School (SVHS) was founded in 1999 and is in Santa Cruz County. The staff and students have an active NCBI group. Now deactivated in 2007 due to the high payments necessary to be part of NCBI, now a club has started that has the same aspects of NCBI without its title.
