= Happy Valley Elementary School District =

School district in California, United States

Address
- 3125 Branciforte Drive Santa Cruz, California, 95065; United States

District information
- Type: Public
- Grades: K–6
- NCES District ID: 0616560

Students and staff
- Students: 105 (2020–2021)
- Teachers: 5.8 (FTE)
- Staff: 2.78 (FTE)
- Student–teacher ratio: 18.1:1

Other information
- Website: www.hvesd.com

Happy Valley Elementary School District is a public school district based in Santa Cruz County, California, United States.
