= Santa Cruz High School =

Public high school in Santa Cruz, California

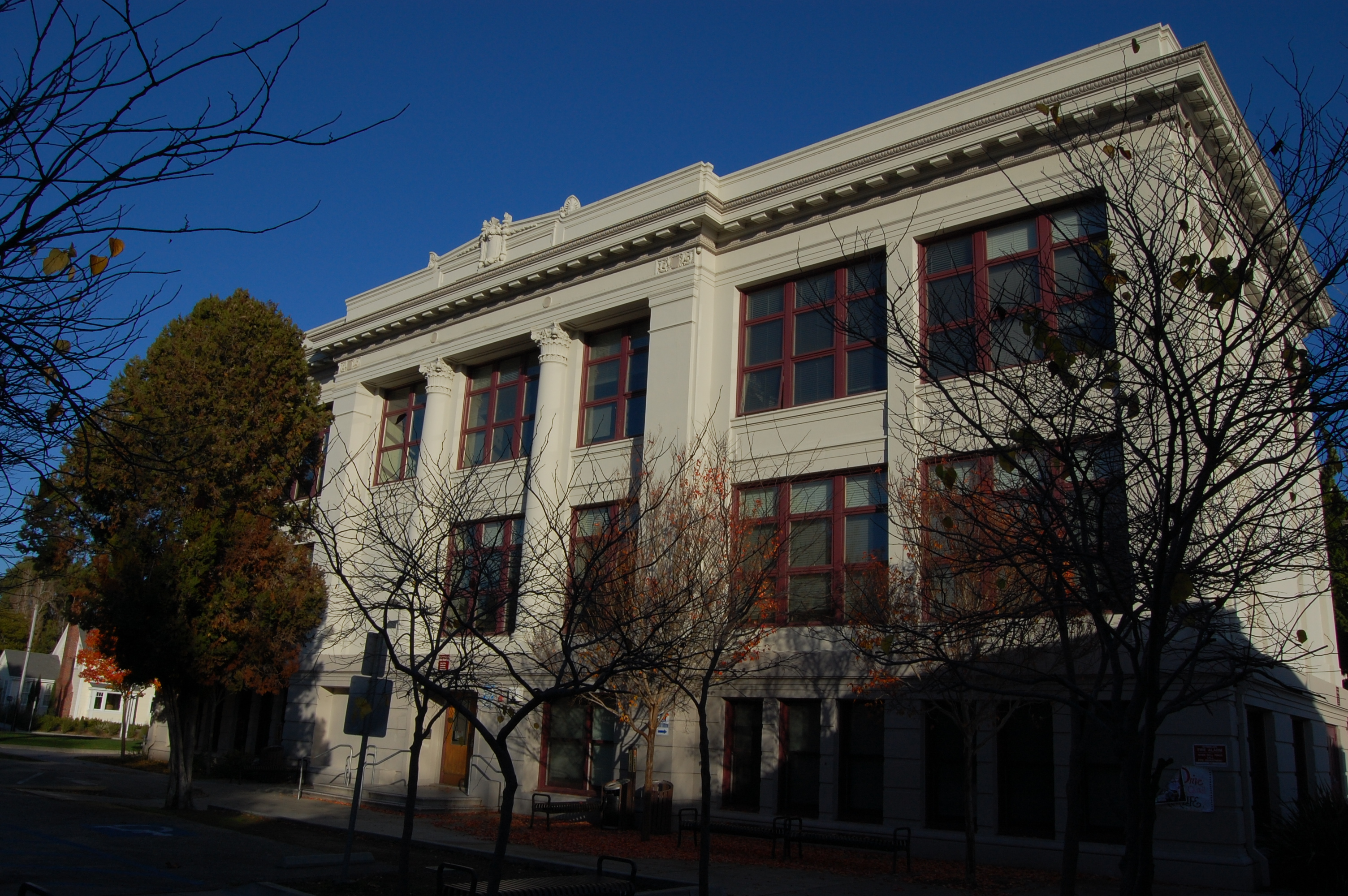

Location
- 415 Walnut Ave. Santa Cruz, California 95060; 36.97153°N 122.03351°W

Information
- Type: Public
- Established: 1897
- School district: Santa Cruz City School District
- Principal: Casey Denning
- Staff: 50.90 (FTE)
- Grades: 9–12
- Enrollment: 1,104 (2023-2024)
- Student to teacher ratio: 21.69
- Colors: Cardinal; White
- Athletics: Baseball, Basketball, Cheer, Cross Country, Football, Golf, Lacrosse, Marching Band, Color Guard, Jazz Band, Soccer, Softball, Swimming, Tennis, Track, Volleyball, Water Polo, Wrestling
- Athletics conference: CIF CCS - SCCAL
- Mascot: Cardinal
- Website: Santa Cruz High School

Santa Cruz High School is a comprehensive public school in Santa Cruz, California which originally opened in 1897 and now serves an enrollment of about 1,040 students in grades nine through twelve. It is part of the Santa Cruz City School District. The school's mascot is a cardinal.

== History ==
The original Santa Cruz High School building was built in 1895 and first opened in 1897. Previously, all High School classes had been taught on the fourth floor of Mission Hill Middle School. The first class graduated at Smith's Opera House on June 7, 1878, with a total of four pupils: Evelyn Pope, Cornelia Chappelmann, John Cooper, and Underwood McCann, receiving diplomas. In 1894, a vote of 530 to 175 decided that a separate building was needed, leading its construction in 1895.

=== Fire and Reconstruction ===
On October 1, 1913, at approximately 6:00 in the evening the school caught fire. The cause of the fire remains unknown, however the Santa Cruz Sentinel reported the following day that the blaze appeared to have broken out on the third story of the building. The alarm sounded at 6:40 pm at the firehouse and the beach, the fire department arrived on the scene, and unsuccessfully tried to combat the blaze with its singular "fire auto" and various hoses placed all around the building. Neighbors used their garden hoses from across the street, with reports of people climbing on the roofs of their houses to better aim the jets of water.

The frame structure of the building and the ignition point of the fire made it extremely difficult to combat. While the firefighters made several advances, most notably by getting onto the second story balcony at the North corner of the building, they ultimately were forced to retreat. The school was deemed unsalvageable around 7:00, after the water from the fire hoses was dissolved into steam by the heat of the flames. The fire threatened neighboring homes until the building eventually collapsed in on itself.

Approximately 5,000 onlookers watched the blaze, according to one source, having abandoned early efforts to salvage school property; however some things, such as 40 new typewriters, and the school records and trophies, were saved. At the time, there were 345 students attending the school and the principal was George A. Bond. For the next few years the classes were held at various locations around town, for example Bay View and Mission Hill schools, until March 17, 1914, when a vote of 5 to 1 made the decision to construct a new building in the same location. The current building was opened in the fall of 1915, is made of reinforced concrete, and contains 27 classrooms and an auditorium with a capacity of 830. It was designed by architect W. H. Weeks, of San Francisco.

=== World Wars and Memorial ===
A total of 11 former students were killed in World War I, between 1917 and 1918. In 1919, the graduating class carved the names of those alumni into the marble facing of the wall of the entry hall, as a memorial to those lost in the war. Above the names is carved the inscription, "Freedom Cometh Not Free." George A. Bond wrote a letter in the 1919 year book dedicating it, saying "Their names are carved...not only on the marble of our school walls, but on the ineffaceable marble of our memories and our hearts."

In the early 1920s, eleven black walnut trees were planted around the athletic field, one for each of the alumni who died during the war. In 2008, there were tensions between neighborhood residents of Myrtle Street and the Santa Cruz City School District over plans to cut down four of the trees as part of a track renovation project for the Santa Cruz High School Memorial Track and Field. The residents argued that the trees were a valuable part of the school's history and the plans should be altered to accommodate them, whereas the District argued that it would cost too much money and the trees, which showed indications of interior rot, would have to be cut down anyway. As of 2009, two of the trees had been removed, with plans for the removal of the remaining two of the original four disputed trees, much to the displeasure of several members of Veterans of Foreign Wars, who saw it as breaking a "covenant" made when the trees were planted.

After WWII, a second memorial was constructed along the same wall as the first, listing the names of the students who had fallen in service. Each year, these students' biographies and photos, as well as those of women who served but were unharmed in the war, are placed next to the names upon the wall.

=== Newspaper ===
Much of the historical information known about Santa Cruz High School comes from the old school newspaper, "The Trident". First published in 1906 and edited by George Griffin (class of 1907), it gave accounts of events around the school, student opinion, activities and administration at SCHS. After the boys' Manual Training program was introduced in 1916, the Trident was printed on two small student-operated presses in the printing department. The newspaper continued at least into the 1990s. The newspaper returned in the fall of 2017, but has since ceased operations. There is also a separate Trident Building, now used to teach classes in.

== Athletics ==
Fall	Winter	Spring
Football	Boys Soccer	Baseball
Cross Country	Girls Soccer	Boys Golf
Girls Golf	Boys Wrestling	Boys Lacrosse
Girls Tennis	Girls Wrestling	Girls Lacrosse
Girls Volleyball	Girls Basketball	Softball
Boys Water Polo	Boys Basketball	Swimming
Girls Water Polo		Boys Tennis
Cheer		Boys Volleyball
Flag Football		Track
		Girls Beach Volleyball

== Extracurricular activities ==
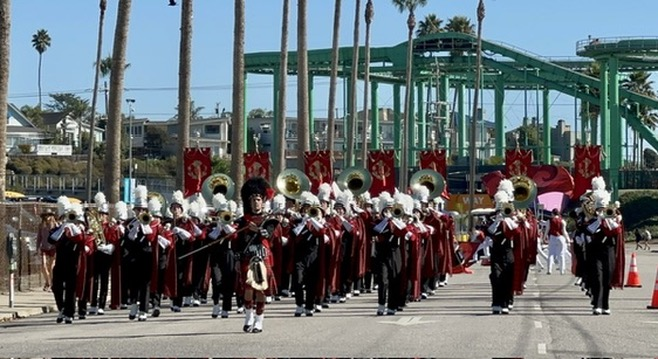
Santa Cruz High School Cardinal Regiment participating in the Santa Cruz Band Review with the Santa Cruz Beach Boardwalk in the background

=== Band ===
After being established in 1925, the band program is one of the oldest in California. The Cardinal Regiment, the Santa Cruz High School's marching band, is the only competitive marching band left in Santa Cruz County.

Santa Cruz High also offers students enrolled in the marching band to join a 0-period jazz band. The band meets before school every morning and travels along with the marching band to play in various competitions and festivals, including the Santa Cruz Jazz Festival.

=== Woman's Honor Society ===
The Woman's Honor Society (or Girl's Honor Society, as it was known until 1989), was founded in 1922. It still exists at Santa Cruz High School today.

=== Drama ===
The Drama Club was founded c. 1912, along with the arrival of a stage in the original building. It is a student-run after-school activity that still exists today. Well known actress and alumna ZaSu Pitts participated in school theater productions while attending SCHS, between 1914 and 1915.

== Notable alumni ==
- Brendon Ayanbadejo, NFL football player (linebacker and specialist), Baltimore Ravens
- Obafemi Ayanbadejo, NFL football player, fullback
- Joe Brovia, baseball player for San Francisco Seals
- Cornelius Bumpus, saxophonist for Steely Dan, The Doobie Brothers, and others
- Jason Collins, Mavericks big wave surfer
- Ashtyn Davis, NFL player for San Francisco 49ers
- Wes Gallagher, journalist for the Associated Press
- Jeremy Green, son of Dennis Green, former Cleveland Browns director of pro personnel and ESPN analyst
- Glenallen Hill, former baseball player for San Francisco Giants and other teams. Whilst playing for the Chicago Cubs, Glenallen Hill is notably the only MLB player to hit a home run onto the 5-story residential building across from the left-field wall of Wrigley Field.
- Johnny Johnson, former All-Pro football player (running back) for Phoenix Cardinals and New York Jets
- Leo Laporte, radio personality and host of The Tech Guy show on Premiere Radio Networks
- Arthur Marcum, screenwriter of Iron Man
- Robert Hale Merriman, Chief Of Staff of the Abraham Lincoln Battalion, killed in action in the Spanish Civil War
- ZaSu Pitts, actress who starred in many film dramas and comedies
- Joshua L. Pomer, filmmaker
- Michael Shipley, television writer and producer
- Oliver P. Smith, U.S. Marine four star general
- Reggie Stephens, former NFL player for New York Giants
- Ted Templeman, record producer
- Darryl Virostko, Mavericks big wave surfer
- Nat Young, WSL pro surfer.

== See also ==
- Santa Cruz County high schools
