= Aptos High School =

Coordinates: 36.977°N 121.860°W

Location
- 100 Mariner Way; Aptos, Santa Cruz County, California 95003

Information
- School type: Public Comprehensive High School
- Opened: Fall, 1969
- School district: Pajaro Valley Unified School District (PVUSD)
- Principal: Lisa Lansdale
- Teaching staff: 60.51 (FTE)
- Grades: 9-12
- Student to teacher ratio: 21.75
- Colors: Navy Blue and Silver
- Slogan: It's a great day to be a Mariner.
- Athletics: comprehensive athletics program
- Mascot: Mac The Mariner
- Nickname: AHS
- Team name: The Mariners
- Yearbook: Sandscript
- Communities served: Aptos, Buena Vista, Corralitos, La Selva Beach, Rio Del Mar, Seacliff, Seascape, portion of Watsonville
- Website: www.aptoshs.net

Aptos High School is a comprehensive secondary school in Aptos, California, USA in the Pajaro Valley Unified School District. Aptos High serves the communities of Rio Del Mar, Corralitos, Seacliff, Seascape, La Selva Beach, Buena Vista and Watsonville.

Historically, Aptos has been one of the largest high schools in Santa Cruz County, but recently Watsonville High School and Pajaro Valley High School have surpassed its enrollment.

In addition to standard curriculum, Aptos High School offers video production, computer technology, and various other courses. Some of the music classes, such as guitar, were dropped due to cuts in the California school budget. Recently, however, music classes such as band and drumline have been reintroduced.

As of 2008 Aptos High School has a new Performing Arts Center, where school plays are performed. There are also two gymnasiums, used for multiple sports, such as basketball and volleyball, and baseball.

The campus included a popular disc golf course for many years, but it was shut down during the 2020 pandemic.

In 2010, the Mariners hired Coach Randy Blankenship from Madera to be their new head football coach. Since then, the Mariners football team has been to the playoffs every year. They have won five consecutive league championship and three consecutive section championships. The Girls Cross Country team has won sixteen Central Coast Section titles and two CIF State Championships. The Girls Volleyball team has qualified for the section playoffs for the past 26 years in a row. The Girls Track & Field team owns the second longest dual-meet win streak in California history. Between 1996 and 2005, they won 118 consecutive dual meets.

== Notable alumni ==
- Trent Dilfer, NFL football player, Super Bowl champion, Baltimore Ravens
- Estelí Gomez, Grammy Award winning singer
- Brett Gotcher, professional long-distance runner
- Nikki Hiltz, professional runner
- Luke Keaschall, MLB second baseman, Minnesota Twins
- Sam Kennedy, NFL football player, Super Bowl champion, San Francisco 49ers
- Jared Koenig, MLB pitcher, Oakland Athletics
- Randy Kramer, (baseball coach) MLB pitcher; professional baseball scout, Toronto Blue Jays
- Lisa Leuschner, professional musician and recording artist
- Greg London, American singer
- Donny McCaslin, professional jazz saxophonist and recording artist
- Peter Mel, professional surfer; BIG Wave-2X Maverick champion
- Marisa Miller, swimsuit model
- Robert Oberst, professional Strongman competitor
- Jennifer Palmieri, White House Communications Director
- Jeff Schalk, professional mountain bike racer
- Carlos Torres, pitcher in the San Francisco Giants organization

== See also ==
- Santa Cruz County high schools
