= Live Oak School District =

School district in California

Address
- 2201 Pennington Road Live Oak, California, 95953; United States

District information
- Type: Public
- Grades: K–12
- NCES District ID: 0622050

Students and staff
- Students: 1,902 (2020–2021)
- Teachers: 92.91 (FTE)
- Staff: 118.22 (FTE)
- Student–teacher ratio: 20.47:1

Other information
- Website: www.losd.ca

The Live Oak School District contains 6 schools in Live Oak, Santa Cruz County, California. The district was founded in 1872 by Martin Kinsley, an Irish immigrant. The first school in the district was the Live Oak School House. The superintendent, Lorie Chamberland, was appointed in 2018. The student population is about 2,100, with 52% Hispanic/Latino and 32% White. The 15-16 budgeted expenditures are just over $17 million.

== Schools ==
- Del Mar Elementary School

Preschool-5th Grade. 1955 Merrill St. Marilyn Rockey, Principal

- Green Acres Elementary School

Preschool-5th Grade. 966 Bostwick Lane. Rebecca Taylor, Principal

- Live Oak Elementary School

Preschool-5th Grade. 1916 Capitola Rd. Greg Stein, Principal

- Ocean Alternative Education Center

Kindergarten-8th Grade. 984-6 Bostwick Lane. Mary Sauter, Principal

- Shoreline Middle School

Grades 6-8. 855 17th Ave. Colleen Martin, Principal, Michael Dorney, Assistant Principal

- Tierra Pacifica Charter School

Kindergarten-8th Grade. 986 Bostwick Lane. Jennifer Proudfoot, Principal

== Programs ==
- Preschool
- Child Development
- After School Education and Safety (ASES)
- Middle School "Teen Center"

== History ==
The District was founded in 1872.

== Awards ==
Green Acres Elementary School won the California Distinguished School Award for 2006. Shoreline Middle School has been recognized by Standards and Poor's for boosting its test scores and closing the gap between socially and economically disadvantaged groups and the rest of the student body.

== See also ==
- List of school districts in Santa Cruz County, CA
- Live Oak, Santa Cruz, California
