= Pacific Elementary School District =

School district in California, United States

Address
- 50 Ocean Street Davenport, California, 95017; United States

District information
- Type: Public
- Grades: K–6
- NCES District ID: 0629340

Students and staff
- Students: 141 (2020–2021)
- Teachers: 6.6 (FTE)
- Staff: 9.26 (FTE)
- Student–teacher ratio: 21.36:1

Other information
- Website: www.pacificesd.org

Pacific Elementary School District is a public school district in Santa Cruz County, California, United States. It contains a single, rural elementary school, Pacific Elementary.

Pacific sponsors several unique programs which have doubled its enrollment from the 60 or so students who live in the district by attracting students from surrounding districts.
