= San Lorenzo Valley Unified School District =

School district in California, United States

Address
- 325 Marion Avenue Ben Lomond, California, 95005; United States

District information
- Type: Public
- Grades: K–12
- NCES District ID: 0634740

Students and staff
- Students: 2,434 (2020–2021)
- Teachers: 110.21 (FTE)
- Staff: 118.04 (FTE)
- Student–teacher ratio: 22.09:1

Other information
- Website: www.slvusd.org

San Lorenzo Valley Unified School District is a public school district in Santa Cruz County, California, United States.

The district serves the unincorporated communities of Ben Lomond, Boulder Creek, Brookdale, Felton, Lompico, Mount Hermon and Zayante.

== History ==
In 2003 San Lorenzo Valley USD gave territory to Scotts Valley Unified School District.

== Board ==
Gail Levine is the current board president.

George Wylie was the prior president.

In 2001, Susan Weber was appointed to the San Lorenzo Valley School Board. In 2010, she vacated her position as trustee for the board, which she had been on for nine years. During her time with the board she held the position of board president for three years.
