= Live Oak, Santa Cruz County, California =

Live Oak
- Census-designated place
- Interactive map of Live Oak
- Location in the United States
- Coordinates: 36°59′10″N 121°58′50″W
- Country: United States
- State: California
- County: Santa Cruz

Area
  - Total: 3.242 sq mi (8.398 km^{2})
  - Land: 3.242 sq mi (8.398 km^{2})
  - Water: 0 sq mi (0 km^{2}) 0%
- Elevation: 102 ft (31 m)

Population (2020)
  - Total: 17,038
  - Density: 5,255/sq mi (2,029/km^{2})
- Time zone: UTC-8 (PST)
  - Summer (DST): UTC-7 (PDT)
- ZIP code: 95062
- Area code: 831
- FIPS code: 06-41922

Live Oak is a census-designated place (CDP) in Santa Cruz County, California, United States, between the cities of Santa Cruz and Capitola and north of the former Union Pacific railroad. Live Oak sits at an elevation of 102 feet (31 m). The population was 17,038 at the 2020 census. The population of the greater Live Oak area, including Twin Lakes and Pleasure Point, was 27,921.

== Geography ==
Live Oak is located at 36°58′53″N 121°58′50″W (36.981363, -121.980476).

According to the United States Census Bureau, the CDP has a total area of 3.2 square miles (8.4 km^{2}), all land.

== History ==
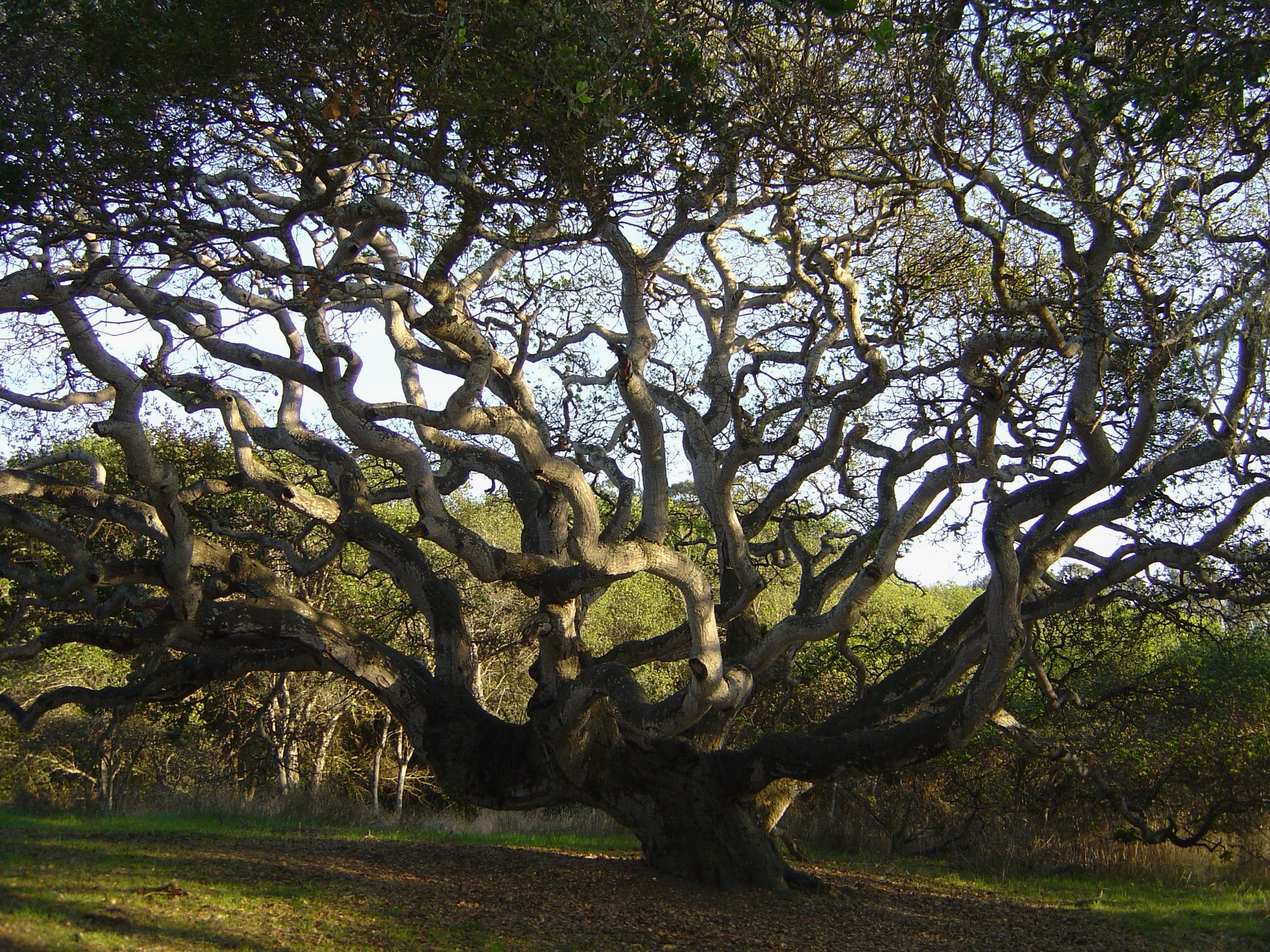
A live oak tree in Live Oak, California.

For several thousand years, the Awaswas-speaking Ohlone people inhabited the area from Half Moon Bay to Aptos, including the area now known as Live Oak. When missionaries established the Mission Santa Cruz in 1791, they noted "an area to the east of the San Lorenzo River "in sight of the Sea" that was crisscrossed by "steep gulches containing running water" and three "reed-lined" lagoons. Spanish colonial settlers, who later established the secular pueblo of Villa de Branciforte on the east side of the San Lorenzo, ran their herds of cattle and horses in the "common lands" of this area.

In 1834 and 1837, territorial governors divided these lands between two brothers, Alejandro and Francisco Rodriguez. Alejandro Rodriguez was granted Rancho Arroyo del Rodeo, named for the rodeo (cattle roundup) area located in a low-lying natural amphitheater along Rodeo Creek. (These grounds were later filled in during the construction of Highway 1.) Francisco Rodriguez was granted a rancho bearing the name "Los Esteros" (never patented) because of the sizeable estuaries forming two of its boundaries. Originally known as Twin Lakes, the westernmost of the "twins" is now the Santa Cruz Harbor.

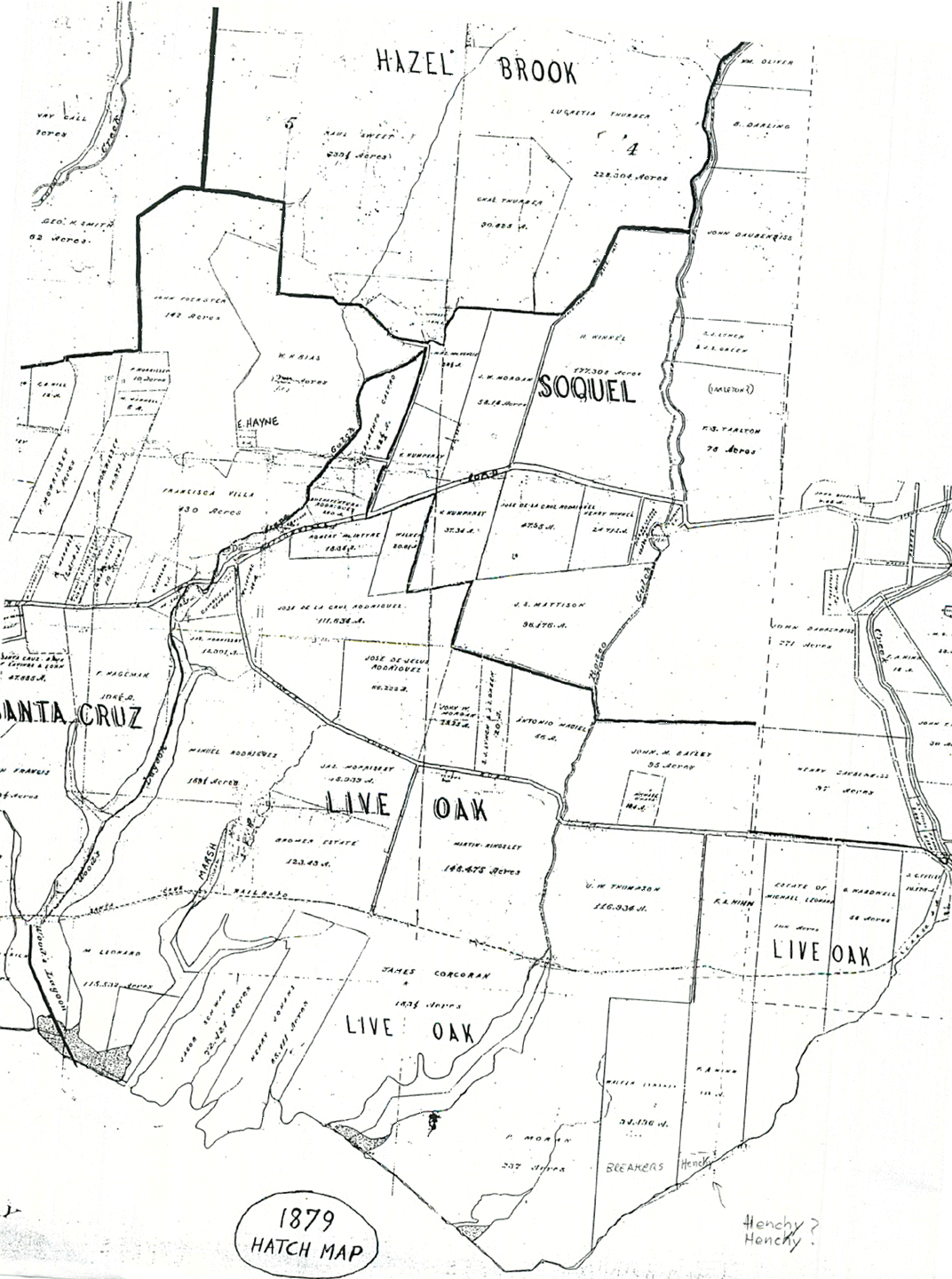
Map of farm properties in Live Oak and environs, 1879.

With the discovery of gold in California in 1848 and American statehood in 1849, legal maneuvering turned the Rodriguez brothers' holdings over to a handful of white settler-farmers. Their farms produced wheat, oats, and barley, supporting small households of adobe and rough-cut lumber. The farmers prospered, establishing a Grange Hall and, in 1872, a small schoolhouse called the "Live Oak School", named for the evergreen live oak trees that dot the area. The Live Oak School District has maintained a facility at this location, now the intersection of 17th Avenue and Capitola Road, to the present day.

By the start of the 20th century, fifty years of wheat and oat farming had depleted the soil such that farmers turned to cultivating fruits and vegetables. Owing to the irrigation needs of these crops, these farms eventually failed and were replaced by a large poultry operation near the present-day intersection of Capitola Road and Soquel Drive, and a floriculture bulb nursery (specializing in callas, narcissus, freesias and begonias) near the present-day intersection of 17th Avenue and East Cliff Drive.

Around 1910, two Santa Cruz real estate agents, the brothers Frank and David Wilson, purchased and subdivided several of the old 19th century wheat farms. The new lots were long and narrow, normally of 2.5 acres (1.0 ha), and came with a "poultry unit" that included a kit for a two-bedroom house, and one or two large chicken coops stocked with a flock of 500 or 1,000 hens and roosters. The layout and shape of these lots has left a distinctive mark on the area's subsequent development. A feed mill to serve the area soon followed.

Egg and poultry prices plummeted in the early years of the Great Depression, and this difficulty was compounded by a double plague of Pullorum Disease and Coccidiosis, which swept through the chicken coops of Live Oak in 1931.

Paved roads and utilities were brought to the area during the 1940s, which also saw the incorporation of Capitola to the east. Bulb nurseries, particularly those specializing in begonias, thrived throughout this period and into the 1950s, when the area was beginning to develop into a residential suburb of Santa Cruz. The west-to-east serial numbering of Live Oak's north–south streets during that period reflected the expectation that the area would soon be annexed to the city of Santa Cruz. Annexation never came, and a movement for Live Oak to incorporate itself as a municipality was abandoned too, in light of the expense of providing the needed services to the area. In the 1970s, Capitola expanded westward, incorporating the tax-rich commercial neighborhood along 41st Avenue. Residential and commercial development in Live Oak continued at a steady pace, under the direction of Santa Cruz County.

== Live Oak today ==
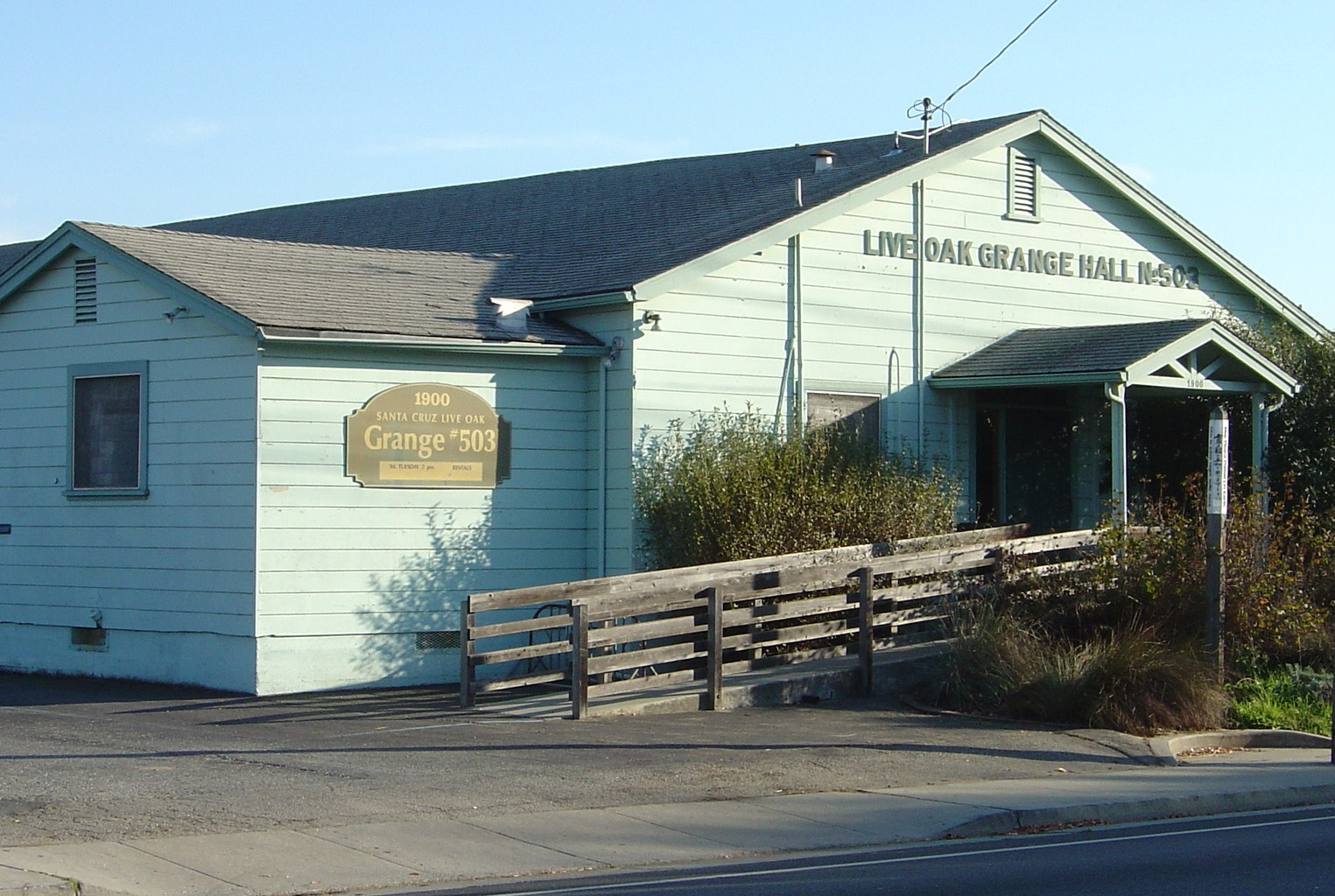
The Live Oak Grange Hall.

Sporadic infill development in Live Oak over the last half century has contributed to the area's eclectic patchwork of trailer parks, ranch-style houses, townhome condominium complexes, and single-family homes in cul-de-sacs, with the 2½ acre plots and their two-bedroom kit houses left over from the chicken farming days (the farms are no longer operating).

Live Oak has no downtown center, but 17th Avenue between Highway 1 and East Cliff Drive is the address for several schools, the Santa Cruz Live Oak Grange Hall, the Fire Department, a Santa Cruz County Sheriff's Department, the Family Swim Center, and the majority of Live Oak's business establishments.

While identified as part of Live Oak, Pleasure Point, Santa Cruz, California, has its own history and developed out of El Rancho Arroyo del Rodeo rather than Rancho Encinalitos.

== Demographics ==
Historical population
Census	Pop.	Note	%±
1960	3,518		—
1970	6,443		83.1%
1980	11,482		78.2%
1990	15,212		32.5%
2000	16,628		9.3%
2010	17,158		3.2%
2020	17,038		−0.7%
U.S. Decennial Census; 1860–1870 1880-1890; 1900 1910 1920; 1930 1940 1950; 1960 1970 1980; 1990 2000 2010; 2020

Live Oak first appeared as an unincorporated community in the 1960 U.S. census; and as a census-designated place in the 1980 United States census.

=== Racial and ethnic composition ===
Live Oak CDP, California – Racial and ethnic composition Note: the US Census treats Hispanic/Latino as an ethnic category. This table excludes Latinos from the racial categories and assigns them to a separate category. Hispanics/Latinos may be of any race.
Race / Ethnicity (NH = Non-Hispanic)	Pop 2000	Pop 2010	Pop 2020	% 2000	% 2010	% 2020
White alone (NH)	11,468	10,782	9,861	68.97%	62.84%	57.88%
Black or African American alone (NH)	204	208	179	1.23%	1.21%	1.05%
Native American or Alaska Native alone (NH)	111	75	58	0.67%	0.44%	0.34%
Asian alone (NH)	610	752	750	3.67%	4.38%	4.40%
Native Hawaiian or Pacific Islander alone (NH)	18	38	32	0.11%	0.22%	0.19%
Other race alone (NH)	56	33	117	0.34%	0.19%	0.69%
Mixed race or Multiracial (NH)	506	474	930	3.04%	2.76%	5.46%
Hispanic or Latino (any race)	3,655	4,796	5,111	21.98%	27.95%	30.00%
Total	16,628	17,158	17,038	100.00%	100.00%	100.00%

=== 2020 ===
The 2020 United States census reported that Live Oak had a population of 17,038. The population density was 5,253.8 inhabitants per square mile (2,028.5/km^{2}). The racial makeup of Live Oak was 62.7% White, 1.2% African American, 1.1% Native American, 4.5% Asian, 0.2% Pacific Islander, 14.8% from other races, and 15.5% from two or more races. Hispanic or Latino of any race were 30.0% of the population.

The census reported that 96.9% of the population lived in households, 1.7% lived in non-institutionalized group quarters, and 1.3% were institutionalized.

There were 6,509 households, out of which 27.9% included children under the age of 18, 41.9% were married-couple households, 8.7% were cohabiting couple households, 30.2% had a female householder with no partner present, and 19.2% had a male householder with no partner present. 28.6% of households were one person, and 15.5% were one person aged 65 or older. The average household size was 2.54. There were 3,920 families (60.2% of all households).

The age distribution was 18.2% under the age of 18, 7.9% aged 18 to 24, 26.1% aged 25 to 44, 27.7% aged 45 to 64, and 20.1% who were 65 years of age or older. The median age was 43.4 years. For every 100 females, there were 97.3 males.

There were 6,820 housing units at an average density of 2,103.0 units per square mile (812.0 units/km^{2}), of which 6,509 (95.4%) were occupied. Of these, 57.2% were owner-occupied, and 42.8% were occupied by renters.

In 2023, the US Census Bureau estimated that 15.6% of the population were foreign-born. Of all people aged 5 or older, 72.7% spoke only English at home, 18.6% spoke Spanish, 4.0% spoke other Indo-European languages, 4.3% spoke Asian or Pacific Islander languages, and 0.4% spoke other languages. Of those aged 25 or older, 90.4% were high school graduates and 41.5% had a bachelor's degree.

The median household income in 2023 was $107,500, and the per capita income was $56,885. About 5.9% of families and 13.1% of the population were below the poverty line.

=== 2010 ===
The 2010 United States census reported that Live Oak had a population of 17,158. The population density was 5,291.4 inhabitants per square mile (2,043.0/km^{2}). The racial makeup of Live Oak was 12,636 (73.6%) White, 240 (1.4%) African American, 171 (1.0%) Native American, 773 (4.5%) Asian, 41 (0.2%) Pacific Islander, 2,444 (14.2%) from other races, and 853 (5.0%) from two or more races. Hispanic or Latino of any race were 4,796 persons (28.0%).

The Census reported that 16,714 people (97.4% of the population) lived in households, 193 (1.1%) lived in non-institutionalized group quarters, and 251 (1.5%) were institutionalized.

There were 6,441 households, out of which 2,083 (32.3%) had children under the age of 18 living in them, 2,669 (41.4%) were opposite-sex married couples living together, 836 (13.0%) had a female householder with no husband present, 353 (5.5%) had a male householder with no wife present. There were 480 (7.5%) unmarried opposite-sex partnerships, and 91 (1.4%) same-sex married couples or partnerships. 1,817 households (28.2%) were made up of individuals, and 746 (11.6%) had someone living alone who was 65 years of age or older. The average household size was 2.59. There were 3,858 families (59.9% of all households); the average family size was 3.16.

The population was spread out, with 3,668 people (21.4%) under the age of 18, 1,667 people (9.7%) aged 18 to 24, 4,738 people (27.6%) aged 25 to 44, 4,907 people (28.6%) aged 45 to 64, and 2,178 people (12.7%) who were 65 years of age or older. The median age was 38.8 years. For every 100 females, there were 96.0 males. For every 100 females age 18 and over, there were 92.5 males.

There were 6,726 housing units at an average density of 2,074.2 per square mile (800.9/km^{2}), of which 3,601 (55.9%) were owner-occupied, and 2,840 (44.1%) were occupied by renters. The homeowner vacancy rate was 1.8%; the rental vacancy rate was 1.9%. 9,291 people (54.1% of the population) lived in owner-occupied housing units and 7,423 people (43.3%) lived in rental housing units.

== Government ==
In the California State Legislature, Live Oak is in the 17th senatorial district, represented by Democrat John Laird, and in the 30th Assembly district, represented by Democrat Dawn Addis.

In the United States House of Representatives, Live Oak is in California's 19th congressional district, represented by Democrat Jimmy Panetta.

== See also ==
- Live Oak School District
