= Santa Cruz County, California =

County in California, United States

Santa Cruz County
- County
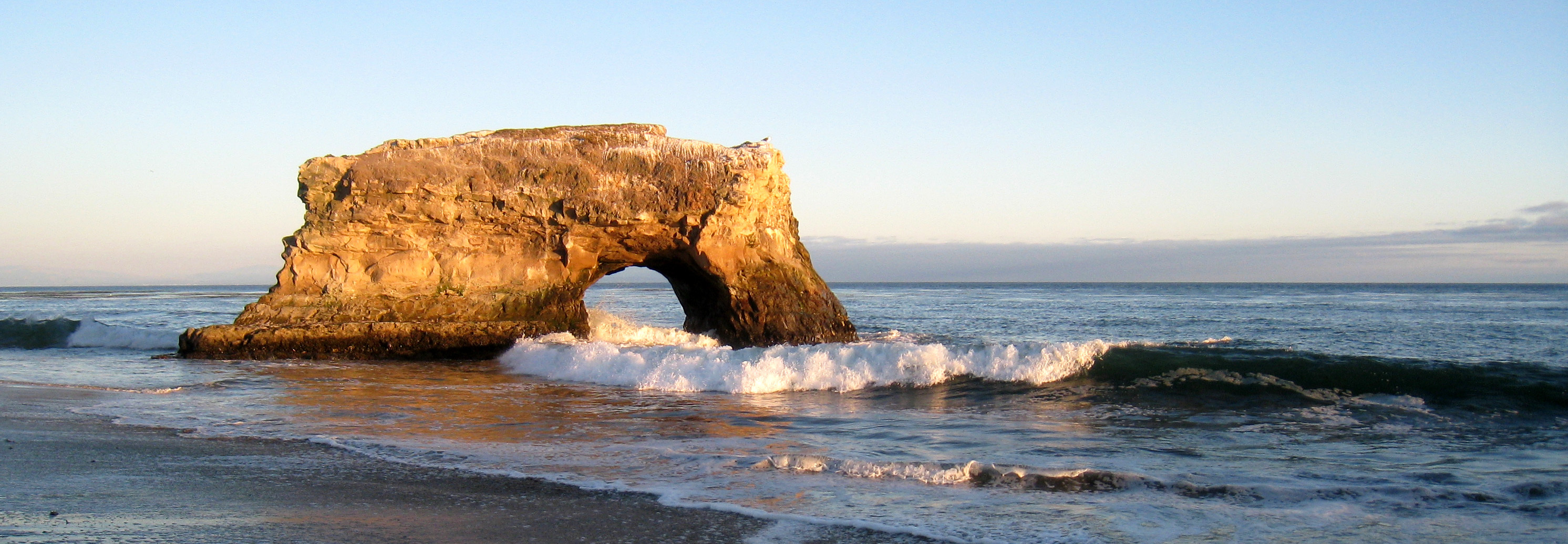
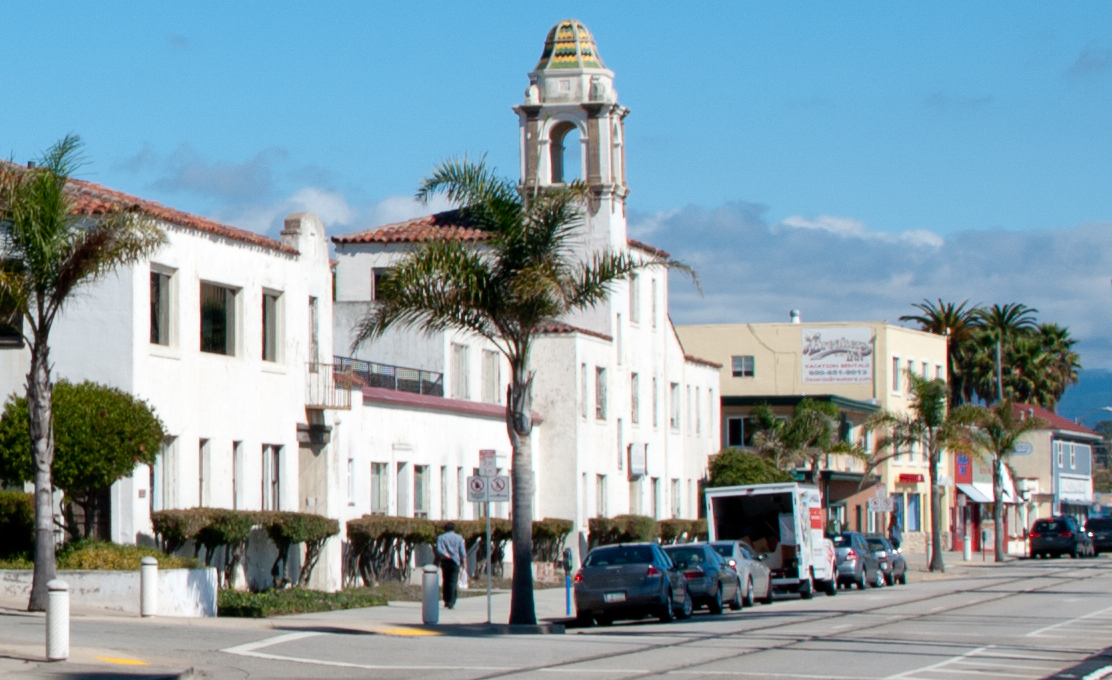
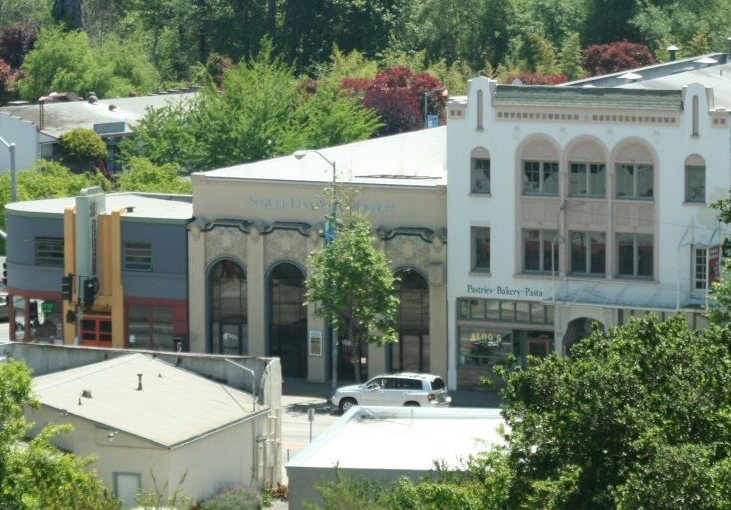
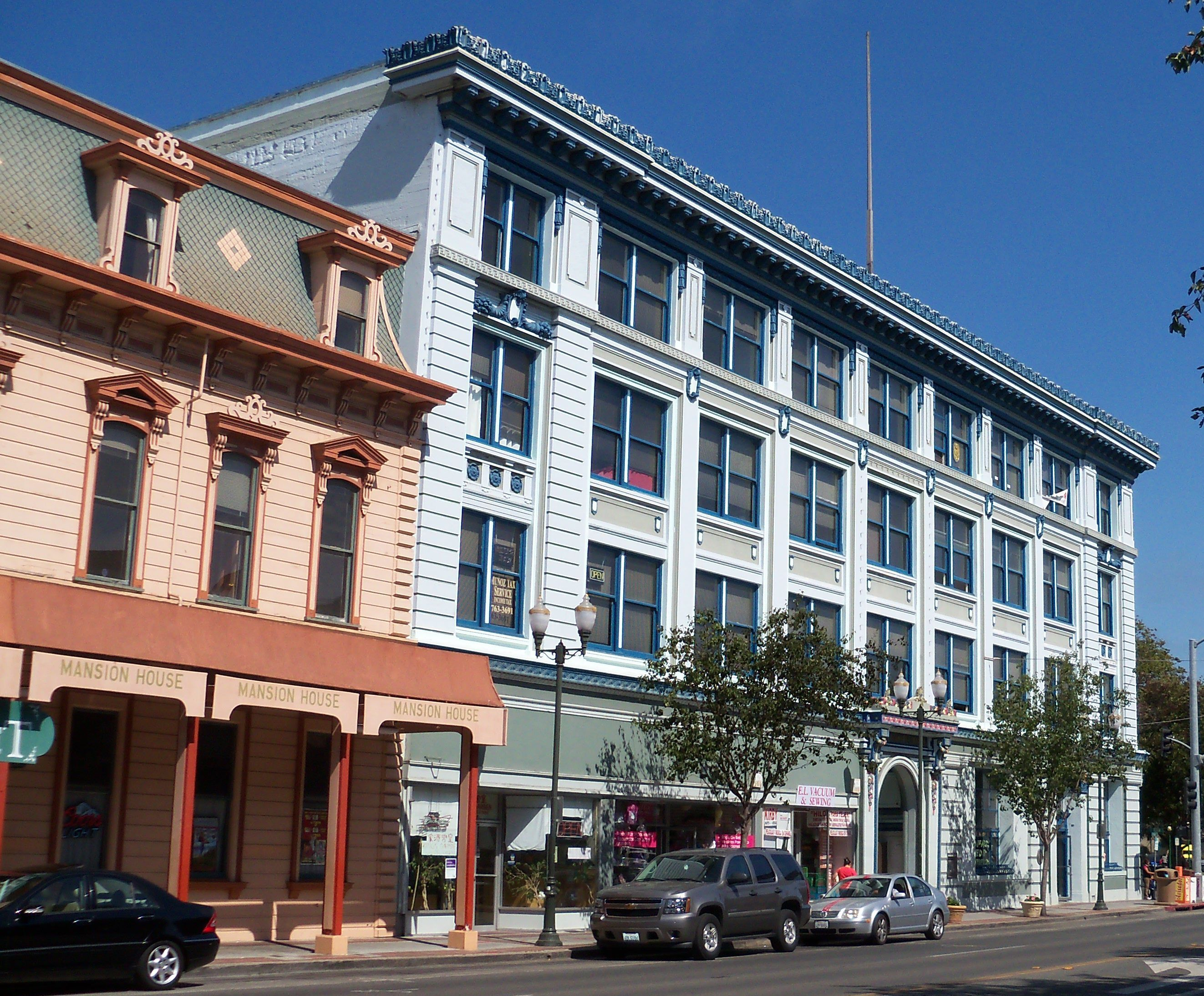
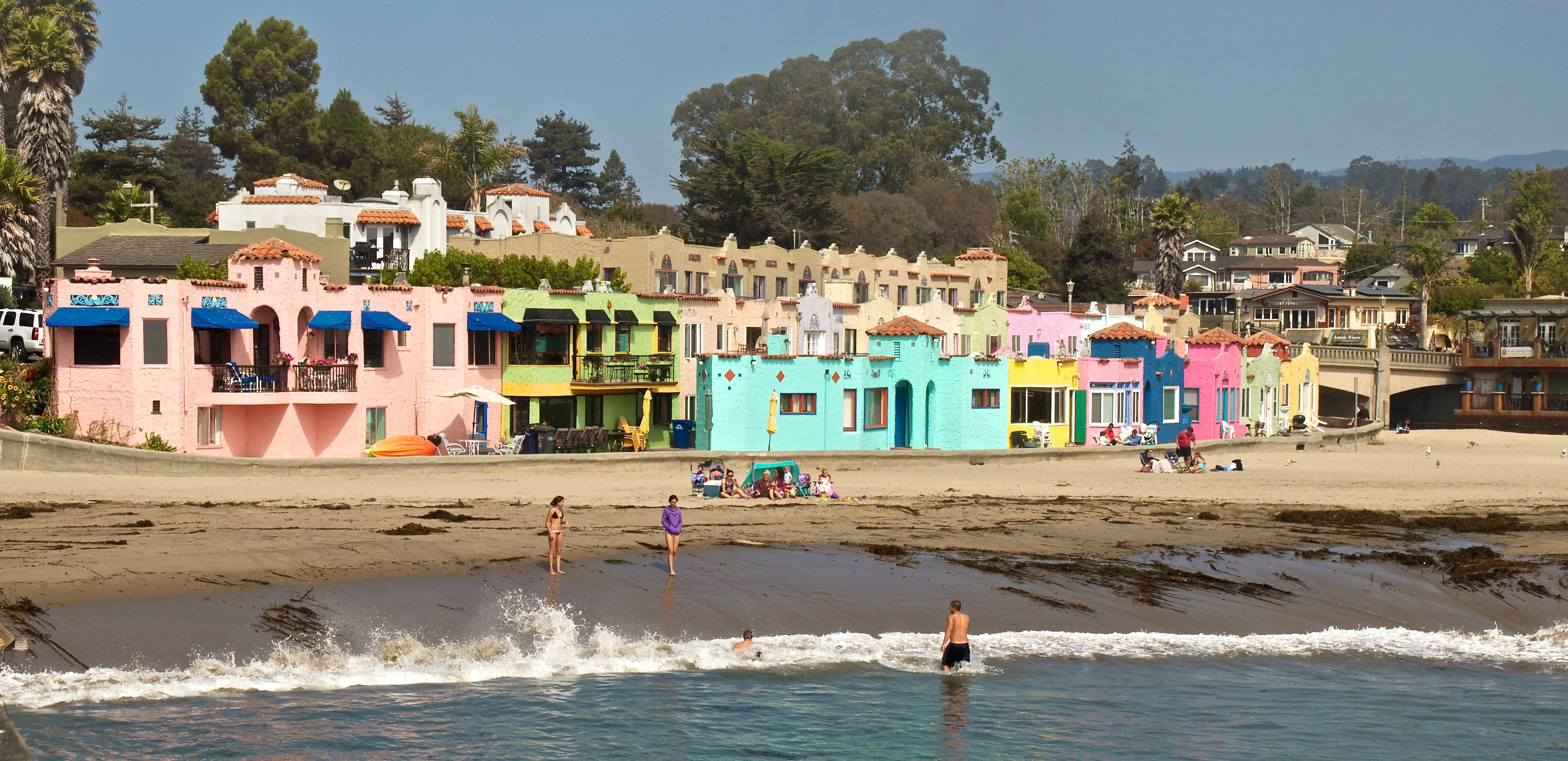
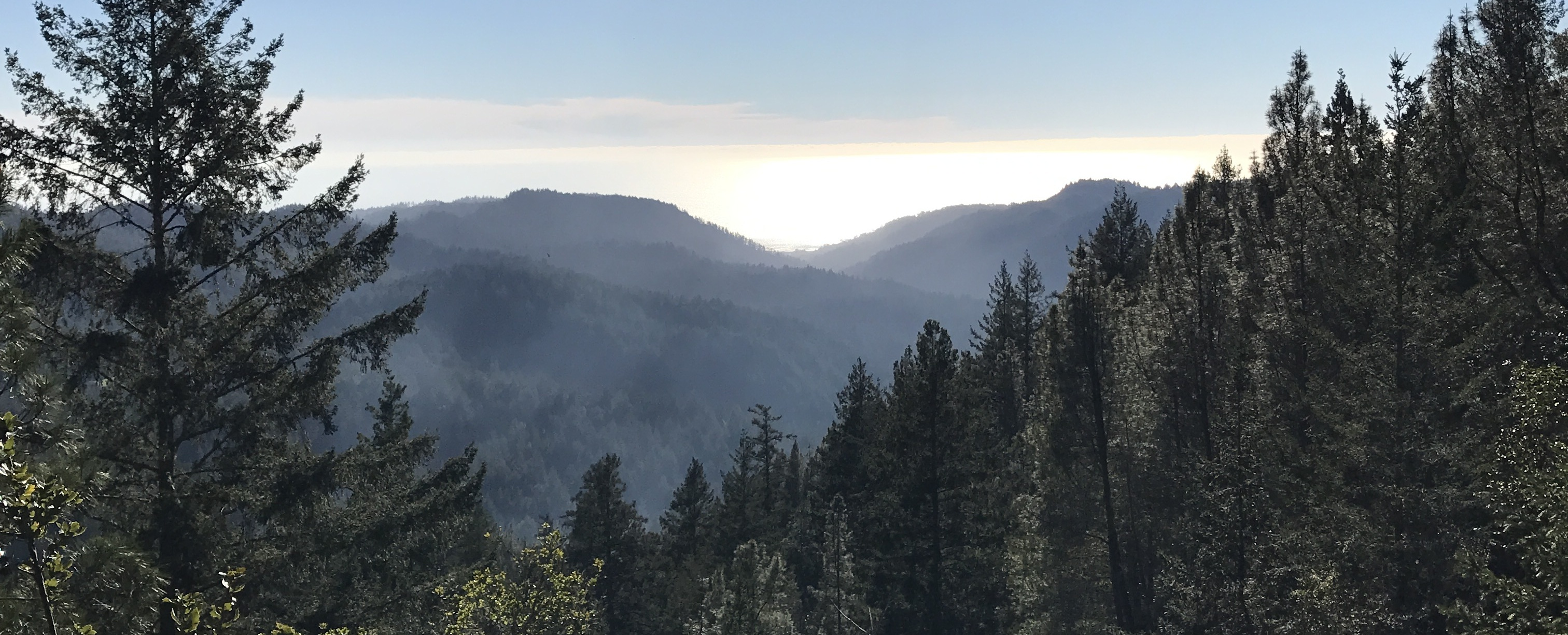
- Natural Bridges State Beach Santa Cruz Soquel Watsonville Capitola Big Basin Redwoods State Park

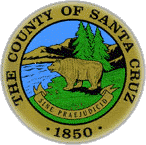
- Flag Seal
- Interactive map of Santa Cruz County
- Location in the state of California
- Coordinates: 37.03°N 122.01°W
- Country: United States
- State: California
- Region: Central Coast
- CSA: San Jose-San Francisco-Oakland
- Incorporated: February 18, 1850
- Named for: Mission Santa Cruz and the city of Santa Cruz, both named after the Exaltation of the Cross
- County seat: Santa Cruz
- Largest city: Santa Cruz

Government
  - Type: Council–CAO
  - Body: Board of Supervisors
  - Chair: Monica Martinez
  - Vice Chair: Manu Koenig
  - Board of Supervisors: Supervisors: Manu Koenig; Kimberly De Serpa; Justin Cummings; Felipe Hernandez; Monica Martinez
  - County Administrative Officer: Carlos J. Palacios

Area
  - Total: 607 sq mi (1,570 km^{2})
  - Land: 445 sq mi (1,150 km^{2})
  - Water: 162 sq mi (420 km^{2})
- Highest elevation: 3,234 ft (986 m)

Population (2020)
  - Total: 270,861
  - Estimate (2025): 258,852 ▼
  - Density: 609/sq mi (235/km^{2})

GDP
  - Total: $19.176 billion (2022)
- Time zone: UTC−8 (Pacific Time Zone)
  - Summer (DST): UTC−7 (Pacific Daylight Time)
- Area code: 831
- FIPS code: 06-087
- GNIS feature ID: 277308
- Congressional districts: 18th, 19th
- Website: santacruzcountyca.gov

Santa Cruz County (/ˌsæntə ˈkruːz/ SAN-tuh-KROOZ), officially the County of Santa Cruz, is a county on the Pacific coast of the U.S. state of California. As of the 2020 census, the population was 270,861. The county seat is the city of Santa Cruz.

Santa Cruz County comprises the Santa Cruz–Watsonville, CA metropolitan statistical area, which is also included in the San Jose–San Francisco–Oakland, CA combined statistical area. The county is on the California Central Coast, south of the San Francisco Bay Area region. The county forms the northern coast of the Monterey Bay, with Monterey County forming the southern coast.

== History ==
Santa Cruz County was one of the original counties of California, created in 1850 at the time of statehood. In the original act, the county was given the name of "Branciforte" after the Spanish pueblo founded there in 1797. A major watercourse in the county, Branciforte Creek, still bears this name. Less than two months later, on April 5, 1850, the name was changed to "Santa Cruz" ("Holy Cross").

Mission Santa Cruz, established in 1791 and completed in 1794, was destroyed by the 1857 Fort Tejon earthquake, but a smaller-scale replica was erected in 1931.

== Geography ==
According to the U.S. Census Bureau, the county has a total area of 607 square miles (1,570 km^{2}), of which 445 square miles (1,150 km^{2}) is land and 162 square miles (420 km^{2}) (27%) is water. It is the second-smallest county in California by land area and third-smallest by total area. Of California's counties, only San Francisco is smaller by land area.

The county is situated on a wide coastline with over 29 miles (47 km) of beaches. It is a strip about 10 miles (16 km) wide between the coast and the crest of the Santa Cruz Mountains at the northern end of the Monterey Bay. It can be divided roughly into four regions: the rugged "north coast"; the urban City of Santa Cruz, Soquel, Capitola, and Aptos; mountainous Bonny Doon, San Lorenzo River Valley; and the fertile "south county", including Watsonville and Corralitos. Agriculture is concentrated in the coastal lowlands of the county's northern and southern ends. Most of the north coastal land comprises relatively flat terraces that end at steep cliffs like those shown in the photo below.

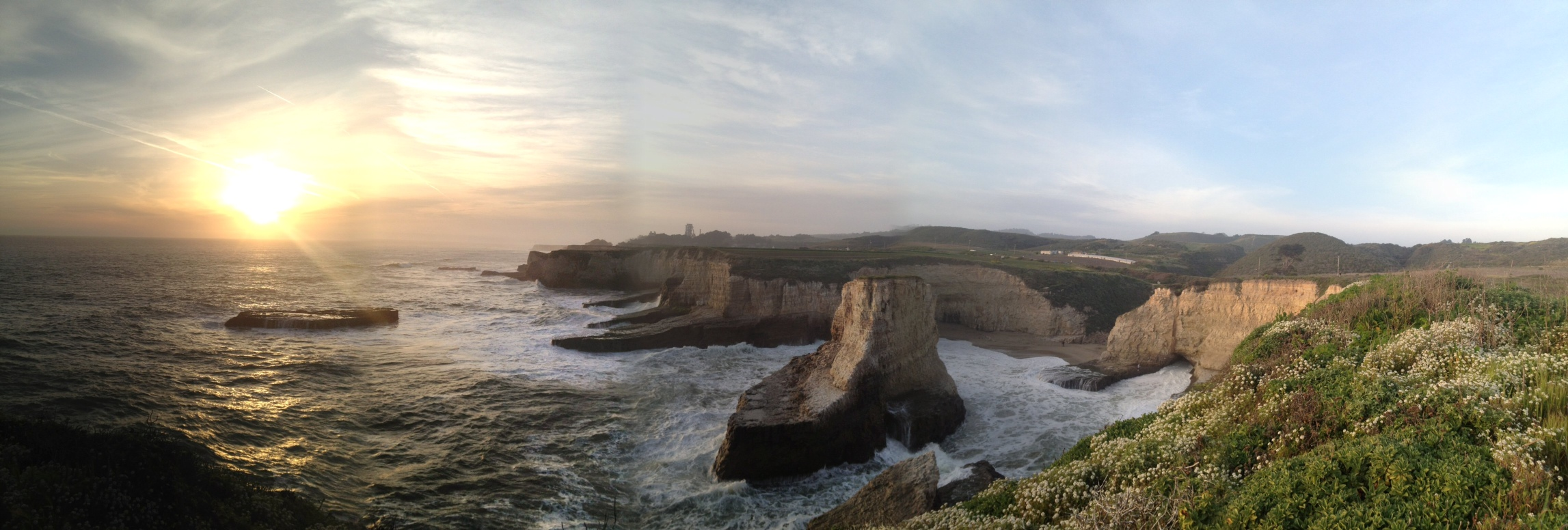
Santa Cruz County north coast

=== Flora and fauna ===
Santa Cruz County is home to the following threatened or endangered species:

- California clapper rail – endangered (1970)
- California red-legged frog – threatened (1996)
- California tiger salamander – Central California DPS, threatened (2004)
- Coho salmon – Central California Coast ESU is endangered (2005)
- Marbled murrelet – threatened (1992)
- Mount Hermon June beetle – endangered (1997)
- Ohlone tiger beetle – endangered (2001)
- San Francisco garter snake – endangered (1967)
- Santa Cruz long-toed salamander – endangered (1967)
- Santa Cruz tarweed – threatened (2000)
- Smith's blue butterfly – endangered (1976)
- Southern sea otter – threatened (1977)
- Steelhead – Central California Coast DPS is threatened (2011)
- Tidewater goby – endangered (1994)
- Western snowy plover – threatened (1993)
- Yellow-billed cuckoo – threatened (2014)
- Zayante band-winged grasshopper – endangered (1997)

Historically, tule elk (Cervus canadensis nannodes) were native to the coastal grasslands of Santa Cruz County. Elk, sometimes confused with bison, were initially described by Miguel Costansó in his diary of the 1769 Portola Expedition near the mouth of the Pajaro River both on the way north on October 6, and on the way south on November 25. Later, elk were also described by nineteenth century American hunters. They were also described in Santa Cruz County by Jlli tribelet Awaswas Ohlone people, who utilized elk along with pronghorn (Antilocapra americana) and lived on the Jarro Coast (El Jarro Point is north of Davenport, California). Additionally, there is a "Cañada del Ciervo" (ciervo is Spanish for elk) close to the boundary between Rancho de los Corralitos and Rancho San Andrés, near the present-day Larkin Valley Road. This "Elk Valley" place name was given by José Antonio Robles who rode down, roped, and killed elk there in 1831. Lastly, elk remains dating from the Middle and Late Periods in Northern California were found in at least four late Holocene archeological sites in Santa Cruz County, all coastal: SCR-9 (Bonny Doon site) and SCR-20 (Brown site) on the western slope of Ben Lomond Mountain, SCR-93 (Sunflower site) a coastal terrace on the north shore of the San Lorenzo River in Santa Cruz, and SCR-132 (Scott Creek site) 4 miles inland.

Pronghorn antelope (Antilocapra americana) remains were found at the SCR-20 (Brown site) on the western slope of Ben Lomond Mountain dating to about 1500 A.D.

Año Nuevo State Marine Conservation Area, Greyhound Rock State Marine Conservation Area and Natural Bridges State Marine Reserve are marine protected areas off the coast of Santa Cruz County. Like underwater parks, these marine protected areas help conserve ocean wildlife and marine ecosystems.

=== Adjacent counties ===
Counties and bodies of water adjacent to Santa Cruz County, California

Santa Cruz County borders four other counties: San Mateo to the northwest, Santa Clara to the north and east, Monterey to the south, and San Benito with a small border to the south.

== Demographics ==
Historical population
Census	Pop.	Note	%±
1850	643		—
1860	4,944		668.9%
1870	8,743		76.8%
1880	12,802		46.4%
1890	19,270		50.5%
1900	21,512		11.6%
1910	26,140		21.5%
1920	26,269		0.5%
1930	37,433		42.5%
1940	45,057		20.4%
1950	66,534		47.7%
1960	84,219		26.6%
1970	123,790		47.0%
1980	188,141		52.0%
1990	229,734		22.1%
2000	255,602		11.3%
2010	262,382		2.7%
2020	270,861		3.2%
2025 (est.)	258,852	▼	−4.4%
U.S. Decennial Census; 1790–1960 1900–1990; 1990–2000 2010 2020

=== 2020 census ===
As of the 2020 census, the county had a population of 270,861. The median age was 40.2 years, with 18.9% of residents under the age of 18 and 18.2% aged 65 or older. For every 100 females there were 98.6 males, and for every 100 females age 18 and over there were 97.5 males age 18 and over.

The racial makeup of the county was 59.3% White, 1.2% Black or African American, 1.3% American Indian and Alaska Native, 4.6% Asian, 0.1% Native Hawaiian and Pacific Islander, 19.2% from some other race, and 14.3% from two or more races. Hispanic or Latino residents of any race comprised 34.8% of the population.

There were 96,261 households in the county, of which 29.2% had children under the age of 18 living with them and 27.0% had a female householder with no spouse or partner present. About 26.1% of all households were made up of individuals and 12.6% had someone living alone who was 65 years of age or older.

There were 106,345 housing units, of which 9.5% were vacant. Among occupied housing units, 58.2% were owner-occupied and 41.8% were renter-occupied. The homeowner vacancy rate was 1.0% and the rental vacancy rate was 3.7%.

86.7% of residents lived in urban areas, while 13.3% lived in rural areas.

=== Racial and ethnic composition ===
Santa Cruz County, California – Racial and ethnic composition Note: the US Census treats Hispanic/Latino as an ethnic category. This table excludes Latinos from the racial categories and assigns them to a separate category. Hispanics/Latinos may be of any race.
Race / Ethnicity (NH = Non-Hispanic)	Pop 1980	Pop 1990	Pop 2000	Pop 2010	Pop 2020	% 1980	% 1990	% 2000	% 2010	% 2020
White alone (NH)	151,715	171,203	167,464	156,397	145,551	80.64%	74.52%	65.52%	59.61%	53.74%
Black or African American alone (NH)	1,396	2,330	2,160	2,304	2,850	0.74%	1.01%	0.85%	0.88%	1.05%
Native American or Alaska Native alone (NH)	1,515	1,310	1,180	978	853	0.81%	0.57%	0.46%	0.37%	0.31%
Asian alone (NH)	4,985	7,690	8,464	10,658	12,072	2.65%	3.35%	3.31%	4.06%	4.46%
Native Hawaiian or Pacific Islander alone (NH)	x	x	311	292	277	x	x	0.12%	0.11%	0.10%
Other race alone (NH)	882	404	858	612	1,649	0.47%	0.18%	0.34%	0.23%	0.61%
Mixed race or Multiracial (NH)	x	x	6,679	7,049	13,310	x	x	2.61%	2.69%	4.91%
Hispanic or Latino (any race)	27,648	46,797	68,486	84,092	94,299	14.70%	20.37%	26.79%	32.05%	34.81%
Total	188,141	229,734	255,602	262,382	270,861	100.00%	100.00%	100.00%	100.00%	100.00%

=== American Community Survey 2025 data ===
The United States Census Bureau estimated that in 2025, Santa Cruz County’s population was 258.852. It was also estimated that the county's population was 53,27% Non-Hispanic White, 35,79% Hispanic or Latino, 1,21% Non-Hispanic Black, 5,02% Asian, 0,36% Native American, 0,12% Pacific Islander, and 4,25% Multiracial.

Total	Population	Percentage
Non-Hispanic White	137.883	53,27%
Hispanic or Latino	92.631	35,79%
Non-Hispanic Black	3.131	1,21%
Asian	12.988	5,02%
Native American	922	0,36%
Pacific Islander	303	0,12%
Non-Hispanic Multiracial	10.994	4,25%

=== 2010 census ===
The county of Santa Cruz has experienced demographic fluctuations in recent history. Between 1990 and 2000, the population increased by 11.3%. This is primarily because of new births, rather than immigration or migration.

The 2010 United States census reported Santa Cruz County had a population of 262,382. The racial makeup of Santa Cruz County was 190,208 (72.5%) White, 2,766 (1.1%) African American, 2,253 (0.9%) Native American, 11,112 (4.2%) Asian, 349 (0.1%) Pacific Islander, 43,376 (16.5%) from other races, and 12,318 (4.7%) from two or more races. Hispanic or Latino of any race were 84,092 persons (32.0%).

Population reported at 2010 United States census
The County	Total; Population	White	African; American	Native; American	Asian	Pacific; Islander	other races	two or more races	Hispanic or Latino (of any race)
Santa Cruz County	262,382	190,208	2,766	2,253	11,112	349	43,376	12,318	84,092
Incorporated cities and towns	Total; Population	White	African; American	Native; American	Asian	Pacific; Islander	other races	two or more races	Hispanic or Latino (of any race)
Capitola	9,918	7,963	123	59	424	10	869	470	1,957
Santa Cruz	59,946	44,661	1,071	440	4,591	108	5,673	3,402	11,624
Scotts Valley	11,580	9,958	101	57	590	18	292	564	1,158
Watsonville	51,199	22,399	358	629	1,664	40	23,844	2,265	41,656
Census-designated places	Total; Population	White	African; American	Native; American	Asian	Pacific; Islander	other races	two or more races	Hispanic or Latino (of any race)
Amesti	3,478	1,889	12	41	89	1	1,309	137	2,273
Aptos	6,220	5,420	58	43	247	8	175	269	611
Aptos Hills-Larkin Valley	2,381	1,936	12	5	55	1	295	77	541
Ben Lomond	6,234	5,692	32	51	70	11	98	280	515
Bonny Doon	2,678	2,474	9	15	51	5	48	76	168
Boulder Creek	4,923	4,429	54	31	81	5	119	204	366
Brookdale	1,991	1,790	9	12	19	8	66	87	202
Corralitos	2,326	1,980	16	12	48	1	190	79	532
Davenport	408	272	6	5	12	0	82	31	172
Day Valley	3,409	2,898	20	23	85	4	208	171	470
Felton	4,057	3,691	25	29	69	11	60	172	283
Freedom	3,070	1,452	44	31	100	0	1,285	158	2,170
Interlaken	7,321	3,856	58	128	302	2	2,573	402	5,261
La Selva Beach	2,843	2,399	27	23	116	3	146	129	372
Live Oak	17,158	12,636	240	171	773	41	2,444	853	4,796
Lompico	1,137	1,005	6	12	21	4	25	64	115
Mount Hermon	1,037	964	6	3	14	1	18	31	83
Pajaro Dunes	144	92	0	0	6	0	45	1	54
Paradise Park	389	371	2	3	3	0	4	6	15
Pasatiempo	1,041	925	5	6	34	1	22	48	85
Pleasure Point	5,846	4,847	63	45	144	5	506	236	1,140
Rio del Mar	9,216	8,310	61	50	313	7	188	287	899
Seacliff	3,267	2,758	28	40	100	4	189	148	482
Soquel	9,644	7,898	85	71	356	21	693	520	1,606
Twin Lakes	4,917	3,900	70	61	126	8	534	218	1,109
Zayante	705	647	10	6	4	0	18	20	57
Other unincorporated areas	Total; Population	White	African; American	Native; American	Asian	Pacific; Islander	other races	two or more races	Hispanic or Latino (of any race)
All others not CDPs (combined)	23,899	20,696	155	151	605	21	1,358	913	3,320

=== 2000 census ===
As of the census of 2000, there were 255,602 people, 91,139 households, and 57,144 families residing in the county. The population density was 574 people per square mile (222 people/km^{2}). There were 98,873 housing units at an average density of 222 units per square mile (86 units/km^{2}).

There were 91,139 households, out of which 31.9% had children under the age of 18 living with them, 48.0% were married couples living together, 10.2% had a female householder with no husband present, and 37.3% were non-families. 25.1% of all households were made up of individuals, and 8.2% had someone living alone who was 65 years of age or older. The average household size was 2.71 and the average family size was 3.25.

In the county, the population was spread out, with 23.8% under the age of 18, 11.9% from 18 to 24, 30.8% from 25 to 44, 23.5% from 45 to 64, and 10.0% who were 65 years of age or older. The median age was 35 years. For every 100 females there were 99.7 males. For every 100 females age 18 and over, there were 97.8 males.

The median income for a household in the county was $53,998, and the median income for a family was $61,941. Males had a median income of $46,291 versus $33,514 for females. The per capita income for the county was $26,396. About 6.7% of families and 11.9% of the population were below the poverty line, including 12.50% of those under age 18 and 6.30% of those age 65 or over.

Santa Cruz County residents tend to be well-educated. 38.3% of residents age 25 and older hold a bachelor's degree at least, significantly higher than the national average of 27.2% and the state average of 29.5%.

== Government ==
Santa Cruz County is a general-law county governed by a five member Board of Supervisors. The board consists of five members, elected by districts, who serve four-year staggered terms.

== Politics ==
Santa Cruz County was a Republican stronghold for most of the 19th and 20th centuries; from 1860 through 1980 the only Democrats to carry Santa Cruz were Woodrow Wilson in 1916, Franklin D. Roosevelt in 1932 and 1936, Lyndon B. Johnson in 1964, and Jimmy Carter in 1976. However, the opening of UCSC in 1965 caused the county's political landscape to dramatically change.

Today, it is a strongly Democratic county in presidential and congressional elections. The last Republican to carry the county was Ronald Reagan in 1980, and the last Republican to win a majority in the county was Richard Nixon in 1968.

United States presidential election results for Santa Cruz County, California
Year	Republican		Democratic		Third party(ies)	
Year	No.	%	No.	%	No.	%
1880	1,236	50.43%	1,102	44.96%	113	4.61%
1884	1,667	53.69%	1,365	43.96%	73	2.35%
1888	1,996	50.66%	1,750	44.42%	194	4.92%
1892	1,843	44.82%	1,512	36.77%	757	18.41%
1896	1,969	48.24%	1,960	48.02%	153	3.75%
1900	2,173	53.19%	1,635	40.02%	277	6.78%
1904	2,626	60.66%	1,105	25.53%	598	13.81%
1908	2,886	54.71%	1,643	31.15%	746	14.14%
1912	3	0.04%	2,875	40.20%	4,274	59.76%
1916	4,228	44.76%	4,511	47.76%	707	7.48%
1920	5,285	66.28%	1,957	24.54%	732	9.18%
1924	5,402	60.84%	801	9.02%	2,676	30.14%
1928	8,275	68.53%	3,688	30.54%	112	0.93%
1932	6,005	40.06%	8,246	55.01%	739	4.93%
1936	8,260	46.12%	9,326	52.08%	322	1.80%
1940	11,453	50.93%	10,683	47.51%	350	1.56%
1944	11,102	53.80%	9,357	45.34%	178	0.86%
1948	15,395	57.68%	9,862	36.95%	1,433	5.37%
1952	24,353	67.13%	11,536	31.80%	391	1.08%
1956	22,109	63.58%	12,574	36.16%	93	0.27%
1960	24,858	59.61%	16,659	39.95%	187	0.45%
1964	18,836	41.27%	26,714	58.53%	94	0.21%
1968	25,365	50.79%	20,492	41.03%	4,087	8.18%
1972	34,799	49.88%	32,336	46.35%	2,624	3.76%
1976	31,872	43.09%	37,772	51.06%	4,325	5.85%
1980	37,347	43.53%	32,346	37.70%	16,111	18.78%
1984	41,652	45.20%	49,091	53.27%	1,404	1.52%
1988	37,728	36.77%	63,133	61.53%	1,750	1.71%
1992	24,916	21.86%	66,183	58.06%	22,893	20.08%
1996	27,766	26.94%	58,250	56.52%	17,046	16.54%
2000	29,627	27.34%	66,618	61.48%	12,105	11.17%
2004	30,354	24.86%	89,102	72.98%	2,628	2.15%
2008	25,244	19.80%	98,745	77.46%	3,494	2.74%
2012	24,047	20.02%	90,805	75.61%	5,243	4.37%
2016	22,438	17.42%	95,249	73.94%	11,134	8.64%
2020	26,937	18.60%	114,246	78.88%	3,654	2.52%
2024	27,978	20.85%	100,998	75.28%	5,179	3.86%

The last Republican to represent a significant portion of Santa Cruz in Congress was Burt L. Talcott, who was defeated in 1976 by Leon Panetta. Santa Cruz County is split between California's 18th and 19th congressional districts, represented by Zoe Lofgren (D–San Jose) and Jimmy Panetta (D–Carmel Valley), respectively.

In the State Assembly, Santa Cruz County is split between the 28th, 29th and 30th Assembly districts, represented by Democrat Gail Pellerin, Democrat Robert Rivas and Democrat Dawn Addis, respectively. In the State Senate, Santa Cruz County is entirely within the 17th senatorial district, represented by Democrat John Laird.

=== Voter registration ===
Population and registered voters
Total population	259,402	
Registered voters (Note: Percentage of registered voters with respect to total population. Percentages of party members with respect to registered voters follow.)	158,244	61.0%
Democratic	85,812	54.2%
Republican	26,051	16.5%
Democratic–Republican spread	+59,761	+37.7%
Independent	3,699	2.3%
Green	3,145	2.0%
Libertarian	1,388	0.9%
Peace and Freedom	555	0.4%
Americans Elect	4	0.0%
Other	1,483	0.9%
No party preference	36,107	22.8%

==== Cities by population and voter registration ====
Cities by population and voter registration
City	Population	Registered voters	Democratic	Republican	D–R spread	Other	No party preference
Capitola	9,864	64.7%	53.8%	17.1%	+36.7%	8.8%	22.8%
Santa Cruz	59,022	72.6%	58.8%	8.9%	+49.9%	9.2%	25.1%
Scotts Valley	11,480	66.7%	42.1%	30.5%	+11.6%	8.7%	21.7%
Watsonville	50,291	32.0%	64.2%	12.4%	+51.8%	5.3%	19.8%

== Crime ==
Crime rates vary throughout Santa Cruz County. The cities of Santa Cruz and Watsonville are the highest crime regions, where the 34:1000 and 38:1000 per-capita crime victimization rates are worse than around 90% of the rest of California. The rest of the county has lower instances of crime, although the crime rate remains above average for California. Scotts Valley, Felton, and Ben Lomond have the lowest per capita crime victimization rates, at around 28:1000 people.

Noteworthy crime issues in Santa Cruz County include gang crime, and issues stemming from the large transient population. Over a dozen Norteno or Sureno affiliated criminal street gangs operate throughout Santa Cruz County. The county also has the highest homeless population per capita in the state, with the county government's 2024 point-in-time homelessness census estimating the homeless make up just under 2% of the county population.

Local law enforcement agencies include the Santa Cruz County Sheriff's Office, the Santa Cruz, Watsonville, Scotts Valley, and Capitola Police Departments, University of Santa Cruz Police, State Parks Rangers and Game Wardens, and the California Highway Patrol. The Sheriff's Office runs two jail facilities in the county; a maximum-security jail in Santa Cruz city and a minimum-security jail outside Watsonville.

The following table includes the number of incidents reported and the rate per 1,000 persons for each type of offense:

Population and crime rates
Population	259,402	
Violent crime	1,215	4.68
Homicide	10	0.04
Forcible rape	79	0.30
Robbery	222	0.86
Aggravated assault	904	3.48
Property crime	4,805	18.52
Burglary	1,732	6.68
Larceny-theft	6,480	24.98
Motor vehicle theft	847	3.27
Arson	67	0.26

=== Cities by population and crime rates ===
Cities by population and crime rates
City	Population	Violent crimes	Violent crime rate per 1,000 persons	Property crimes	Property crime rate per 1,000 persons
Capitola	10,085	47	4.66	541	53.64
Santa Cruz	60,902	433	7.11	3,585	58.87
Scotts Valley	11,775	16	1.36	325	27.60
Watsonville	52,064	252	4.84	1,585	30.44

== Economy ==
In the 19th century, Santa Cruz's economy was based on milling lumber, making lime cement from limestone, and tanning leather. By the mid 19th century, Santa Cruz was the second largest manufacturing area in the state. As natural resources depleted, tourism became the more important economic sector in the area.

In 1989, Santa Cruz was named as a surplus labor area by the U.S. Department of Labor. A surplus labor area has an unemployment rate 20% higher than national unemployment. As of 2024, Watsonville city was still on this list.

10% of jobs in Santa Cruz County are food producing/processing jobs. These employees make less than an average of $10 an hour.

As of 2003, 21% of residents work outside of Santa Cruz County. This is down form the 28% outside employment rate of 1989.

The agriculture businesses are significant enough to be prominent in local politics, where they influence issues of water, pesticide use, and labor.

There are mandated living wages for Santa Cruz county, and individually in the cities of Watsonville and Santa Cruz. These occurred after The Santa Cruz Living Wage Coalition campaigned to set up ordinances.

The low wage sector of Santa Cruz experiences workplace abuse. Data from 2015 show that in the county, 38% of agricultural workers have experienced overtime pay violation, 14% of tipped workers reported tips stolen by their employers, and 50% of service sector workers reported violations on receiving breaks. It is California law for employers to make written workplace policies available. However, in a county wide survey, 30% of workers reported that they did not receive an employee handbook.

Service sector laborers have a resource for navigating labor law through the Economic Justice Alliance of Santa Cruz County, a local organization that educates community members on issues of "sustainable wages and working conditions."

=== Housing market ===
In 2002, the National Association of Realtors reported that Santa Cruz was the most unaffordable place to live in the United States. This statement remains true with 2017 data that shows that Santa Cruz is the least affordable county for renters.

In Santa Cruz County, 60% of residents rent and a median monthly rent is $3000. UCSC's No Place Like Home Project reports that in Santa Cruz County, 2.5 minimum wage jobs would be needed to afford renting a 2 bedroom apartment. UCSC's "No Place Like Home" project identifies four main rental markets: agricultural workers, UCSC students, Silicon Valley tech workers, and short term vacation rentals. Short term rentals in particular have been a rising concern to local politicians, who have proposed parking restrictions to discourage short term renters.

Rent control has been attempted as a policy in Santa Cruz three times between the 1970s and 1980s, but it never passed. National policies since the 1980s have deregulated rental markets, which decreased the rights of tenants and exacerbated frustrations for renters all across the country as well as in Santa Cruz.

27% of surveyed Santa Cruz County renters experience "overcrowding" in their homes, which is described as when there is more than one person per room of a house, which includes all rooms not just bedrooms.

One of the constraints on Santa Cruz's development are environmental protections. The restrictions on land prevent development from responding to housing and employment demands, which is an issue particularly politically relevant in the Watsonville jurisdiction. This conflict between residents wanting to protect the environment and those wanting more housing is also racially divided, as most residents favoring environmental protection are white, while the population on the side of developing housing is more heavily Latino. A 2010–2011 report by a Santa Cruz County grand jury states that Watsonville had no policy for assessing environmental hazards, and would give out land use and building permits without any investigations of the environmental conditions of the land in question.

One of the housing solutions that residents have resorted to is the occupation of accessory dwelling units. Commonly known as "mother-in-law" units, these secondary housing spaces on residential property used to be illegal to build. In 2002, Santa Cruz leaders changed the law and encouraged construction with affordable mortgages. The goal was to contain urban sprawl while still finding housing alternatives for residents in light of the crisis that was exacerbated by UCSC growth and Silicon Valley encroachment.

=== Land use ===
Debates about land use in Santa Cruz were particularly important after the 1989 Loma Prieta Earthquake, which destroyed the central business district of Santa Cruz and led to the loss of an estimated 2,000 jobs.

Already contentious debates about land were present in the area due to its large tourism industry and the relatively new UCSC campus, but after the quake both private interests and public servants had a stake in how rebuilding would go. This led to a necessary compromise, a public-private partnership that debated the how to rebuild the pacific garden mall space, with considerations of green space, timely implementation, and supporting local business and economy. Many constituents felt left out of this process, and reported that the political elite and economic elite were monopolizing control over the rebuilding movement.

=== Top employers ===
According to Santa Cruz County's 2020–21 Comprehensive Annual Financial Report, the top employers in the county are:

#	Employer	Product/Service	# of Employees
1	University of California, Santa Cruz	Education	1,000–4,999
2	Pajaro Valley Unified School District	Education	1,000–4,999
3	County of Santa Cruz	County Services	1,000–4,999
4	Dominican Hospital	Hospital	1,000–4,999
5	Santa Cruz Governmental Center	City Services	1,000–4,999
6	Graniterock	Excavating Contractors	500–999
7	Plantronics	Telephone Apparatus Mfg.	500–999
8	Watsonville Community Hospital	Hospital	500–999
9	Source Naturals	Vitamin Manufacturer	500–999
10	Santa Cruz Health Center	Clinics	500–999
11	Monterey Mushrooms	Agriculture	500–999
12	Larse Farms Inc	Agriculture	500–999

=== Winemaking and wineries ===
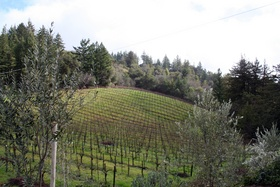
Vineyard in the Santa Cruz Mountains

Winemaking—both the growing of the grapes and their vinting—is an important part of the economic and cultural life of Santa Cruz County. The wines of the David Bruce Winery and Ridge Vineyards were selected for tasting in the Paris Wine Tasting of 1976 (Tabor, p.167-169).

== Education ==
=== Four-year universities ===
- University of California, Santa Cruz (public) in Santa Cruz, California
- Bethany University (private, now defunct) in Scotts Valley, California

=== Two-year college ===
- Cabrillo College (public) in Aptos, California

=== K-12 education ===
School districts include:

Unified:

- Aromas-San Juan Unified School District
- Pajaro Valley Joint Unified School District
- San Lorenzo Valley Unified School District
- Scotts Valley Unified School District

Secondary:

- Los Gatos-Saratoga Joint Union School District
- Santa Cruz City High School District - Covers some areas for grades 6–12 and others for grades 9–12

Elementary:

- Bonny Doon Union Elementary School District
- Happy Valley Elementary School District
- Lakeside Joint Elementary School District
- Live Oak Elementary School District
- Loma Prieta Joint Union Elementary School District
- Mountain Elementary School District
- Pacific Elementary School District
- Santa Cruz City Elementary School District
- Soquel Elementary School District

== Transportation ==
=== Major highways ===
- State Route 1
- State Route 9
- State Route 17
- State Route 35
- State Route 129
- State Route 152
- State Route 236

==== County routes ====
- County Route G12

=== Public transportation ===
Santa Cruz County is served by the Santa Cruz Metropolitan Transit District bus system.

An Amtrak Thruway "Highway 17 Express" bus between Santa Cruz and San Jose is jointly operated by Amtrak, the SCMTD and the Santa Clara Valley Transportation Authority.

=== Airports ===
Watsonville Municipal Airport is a public general aviation airport. There are two air carriers based at the airport offering on-demand air charter:

- AirMonterey, LLC (corporate aircraft)
- Specialized Helicopters, LLC (helicopters)

There is a notable private airport, Monterey Bay Academy Airport, which is a former military base.

The nearest airports for scheduled commercial travel include San Jose International Airport, Monterey Regional Airport, San Francisco International Airport, and Oakland International Airport.

== Communities ==
=== Cities ===
- Capitola
- Santa Cruz (county seat)
- Scotts Valley
- Watsonville

=== Census-designated places ===
- Amesti
- Aptos
- Aptos Hills-Larkin Valley
- Ben Lomond
- Bonny Doon
- Boulder Creek
- Brookdale
- Corralitos
- Davenport
- Day Valley
- Felton
- Freedom
- Interlaken
- La Selva Beach
- Live Oak
- Lompico
- Mount Hermon
- Pajaro Dunes
- Paradise Park
- Pasatiempo
- Pleasure Point
- Rio del Mar
- Seacliff
- Soquel
- Twin Lakes
- Zayante

=== Unincorporated communities ===
- Branciforte
- Felton Grove
- Opal Cliffs
- Swanton

=== Population ranking ===
The population ranking of the following table is based on the 2020 census of Santa Cruz County.

† county seat

Rank	City/Town/etc.	Municipal type	Population (2020 census)
1	† Santa Cruz	City	62,956
2	Watsonville	City	52,590
3	Live Oak	CDP	17,038
4	Scotts Valley	City	12,224
5	Soquel	CDP	9,980
6	Capitola	City	9,456
7	Rio del Mar	CDP	9,128
8	Interlaken	CDP	7,368
9	Aptos	CDP	6,664
10	Ben Lomond	CDP	6,337
11	Pleasure Point	CDP	5,821
12	Boulder Creek	CDP	5,429
13	Twin Lakes	CDP	4,944
14	Felton	CDP	4,489
15	Freedom	CDP	3,835
16	Day Valley	CDP	3,410
17	Seacliff	CDP	3,280
18	Bonny Doon	CDP	2,868
19	Amesti	CDP	2,637
20	La Selva Beach	CDP	2,531
21	Aptos Hills-Larkin Valley	CDP	2,383
22	Corralitos	CDP	2,342
23	Brookdale	CDP	2,043
24	Lompico	CDP	1,154
25	Mount Hermon	CDP	1,110
26	Pasatiempo	CDP	1,093
27	Zayante	CDP	729
28	Davenport	CDP	388
29	Paradise Park	CDP	367
30	Pajaro Dunes	CDP	122

== See also ==
- List of museums in the California Central Coast
- List of school districts in Santa Cruz County, California
- National Register of Historic Places listings in Santa Cruz County, California

== Sources ==
- Taber, George M. Judgment of Paris: California vs. France and the historic 1976 Paris Tasting that Revolutionized Wine. NY: Scribner, 2005.
