= Day Valley, California =

Day Valley
- census-designated place
- Location in Santa Cruz County and the state of California

- Location in the United States
- Coordinates: 37°0′32″N 121°51′24″W
- Country: United States
- State: California
- County: Santa Cruz

Area
  - Total: 18.50 sq mi (47.92 km^{2})
  - Land: 18.50 sq mi (47.92 km^{2})
  - Water: 0 sq mi (0.00 km^{2}) 0%
- Elevation: 1,316 ft (401 m)

Population (2020)
  - Total: 3,410
  - Density: 184.3/sq mi (71.16/km^{2})
- Time zone: UTC-8 (PST)
  - Summer (DST): UTC-7 (PDT)
- ZIP code: 95003
- Area code: 831
- FIPS code: 06-18153
- GNIS feature ID: 1867010

Day Valley is a census-designated place (CDP) in Santa Cruz County, California, United States. The population was 3,410 at the 2020 census.

== Geography ==
Day Valley is located at 37°0′32″N 121°51′24″W (37.008820, -121.856544).

According to the United States Census Bureau, the CDP has a total area of 18.5 square miles (48 km^{2}), most of which is forest and meadows, with a creek at the crossroads of Valencia Rd. and Day Valley Rd.

== Demographics ==
Historical population
Census	Pop.	Note	%±
1990	2,842		—
2000	3,587		26.2%
2010	3,409		−5.0%
2020	3,410		0.0%
U.S. Decennial Census; 1860–1870 1880-1890; 1900 1910 1920; 1930 1940 1950; 1960 1970 1980; 1990 2000 2010; 2020

Day Valley first appeared as an unincorporated community in the 1990 United States census.

=== Racial and ethnic composition ===
Day Valley CDP, California – Racial and ethnic composition Note: the US Census treats Hispanic/Latino as an ethnic category. This table excludes Latinos from the racial categories and assigns them to a separate category. Hispanics/Latinos may be of any race.
Race / Ethnicity (NH = Non-Hispanic)	Pop 2000	Pop 2010	Pop 2020	% 2000	% 2010	% 2020
White alone (NH)	2,884	2,734	2,474	80.40%	80.20%	72.55%
Black or African American alone (NH)	17	15	16	0.47%	0.44%	0.47%
Native American or Alaska Native alone (NH)	28	18	13	0.78%	0.53%	0.38%
Asian alone (NH)	58	80	91	1.62%	2.35%	2.67%
Native Hawaiian or Pacific Islander alone (NH)	0	4	0	0.00%	0.12%	0.00%
Other race alone (NH)	8	0	22	0.22%	0.00%	0.65%
Mixed race or Multiracial (NH)	73	88	153	2.04%	2.58%	4.49%
Hispanic or Latino (any race)	519	470	641	14.47%	13.79%	18.80%
Total	3,587	3,409	3,410	100.00%	100.00%	100.00%

=== 2020 census ===
As of the 2020 census, Day Valley had a population of 3,410. The population density was 184.3 inhabitants per square mile (71.2/km^{2}). 39.0% of residents lived in urban areas, while 61.0% lived in rural areas.

The census reported that 99.1% of the population lived in households, 0.6% lived in non-institutionalized group quarters, and 0.2% were institutionalized. The age distribution was 17.0% under the age of 18, 5.6% aged 18 to 24, 21.3% aged 25 to 44, 26.5% aged 45 to 64, and 29.6% who were 65 years of age or older. The median age was 50.5 years. For every 100 females, there were 97.8 males, and for every 100 females age 18 and over, there were 97.2 males age 18 and over.

There were 1,254 households, of which 22.1% had children under the age of 18 living in them. Of all households, 55.8% were married-couple households, 7.0% were cohabiting couple households, 14.8% had a male householder with no spouse or partner present, and 22.3% had a female householder with no spouse or partner present. About 20.4% of all households were made up of individuals, and 13.2% had someone living alone who was 65 years of age or older. The average household size was 2.7. There were 896 families (71.5% of all households).

There were 1,349 housing units at an average density of 72.9 units per square mile (28.1 units/km^{2}). Of these, 1,254 (93.0%) were occupied and 95 (7.0%) were vacant. The homeowner vacancy rate was 0.1% and the rental vacancy rate was 1.2%. Of the occupied units, 74.5% were owner-occupied and 25.5% were occupied by renters.

=== Income and poverty ===
In 2023, the US Census Bureau estimated that the median household income was $150,256, and the per capita income was $62,813. About 5.5% of families and 4.8% of the population were below the poverty line.

== Government ==
In the California State Legislature, Day Valley is in the 17th senatorial district, represented by Democrat John Laird, and in the 30th Assembly district, represented by Democrat Dawn Addis.

In the United States House of Representatives, Day Valley is in California's 19th congressional district, represented by Democrat Jimmy Panetta.

== Local history ==
Many early settlers to Day Valley (including some members of the Day and Cox families) are buried in a small cemetery in the Forest and Meadows neighborhood, at the corner of Meadow Road and Downing Drive. Cox Road and Day Valley Road are named after these families.
