= Bronzan =

Bronzan is a surname. Notable people with the surname include:

- Bob Bronzan (1919–2006), American football player and coach
- Bruce Bronzan (1947–2020), American politician
