= San Joaquin, California =

City in California, United States

- City
- City of San Joaquin
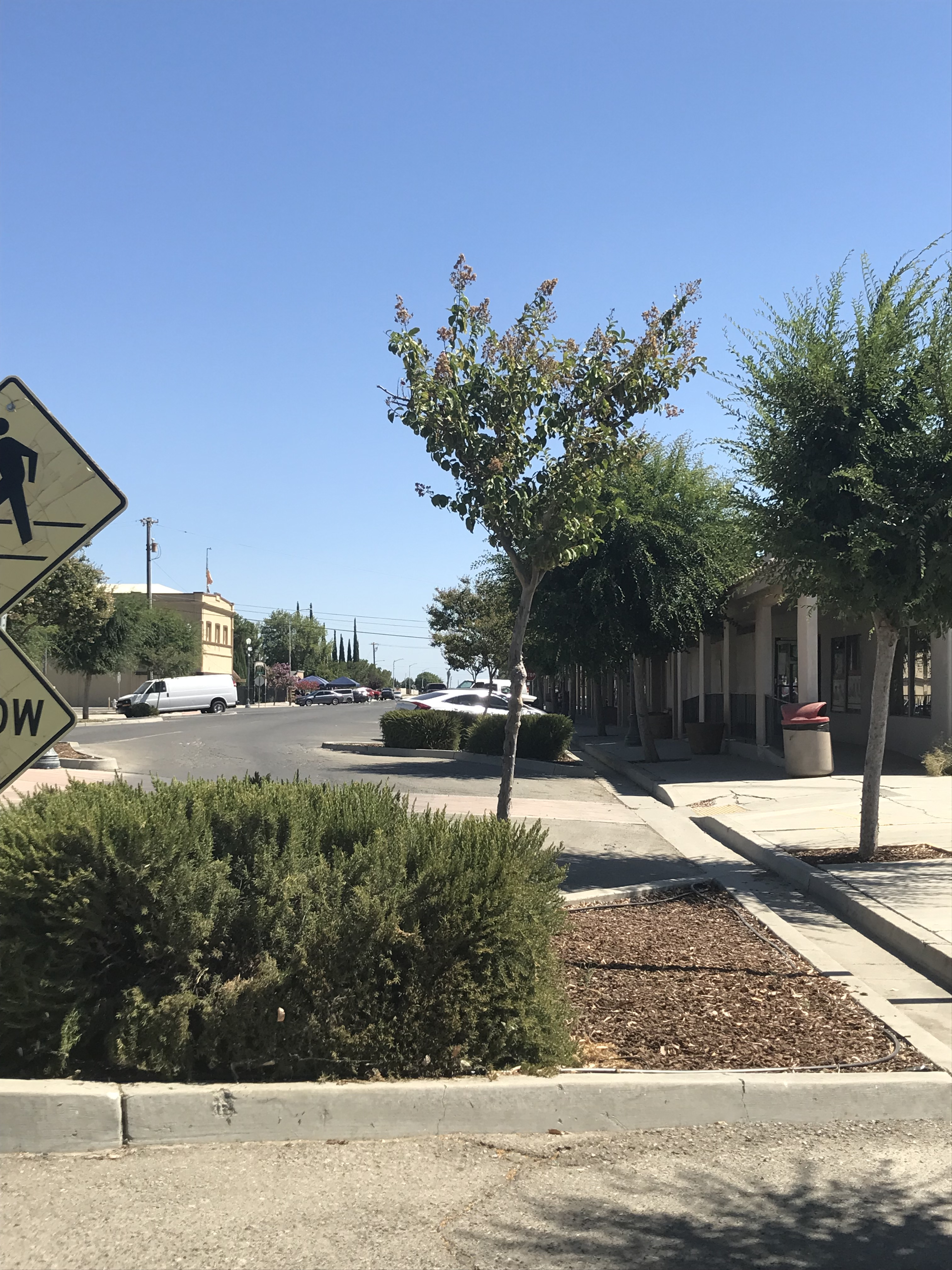
- Main Street in San Joaquin

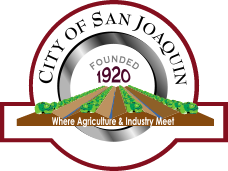
- Seal
- Interactive map of San Joaquin, California
- Location within California Location within the United States
- Coordinates: 36°36′24″N 120°11′21″W
- Country: United States
- State: California
- County: Fresno
- Incorporated: February 14, 1920
- Named for: St. Joachim

Government
  - Type: Council–Manager
  - Mayor: Adam Flores-Cornejo
  - State Senator: Anna Caballero (D)
  - State Assembly: Esmeralda Soria (D)
  - U. S. Congress: Jim Costa (D)

Area
  - Total: 1.20 sq mi (3.10 km^{2})
  - Land: 1.20 sq mi (3.10 km^{2})
  - Water: 0 sq mi (0.00 km^{2}) 0%
- Elevation: 174 ft (53 m)

Population (2020)
  - Total: 3,701
  - Density: 3,090/sq mi (1,190/km^{2})
- Time zone: UTC-08:00 (PST)
  - Summer (DST): UTC-07:00 (PDT)
- ZIP code: 93660
- Area code: 559
- FIPS code: 06-67126
- GNIS feature IDs: 277594, 2411789
- Website: www.cityofsanjoaquin.org

San Joaquin is a city in Fresno County, California, United States. The population was 3,701 at the 2020 census, down from 4,001 at the 2010 census. The nearest high school in the area is Tranquillity High School in Tranquillity. San Joaquin is located 11 miles (18 km) southwest of Kerman, at an elevation of 174 feet (53 m).

== Etymology ==
San Joaquin (Spanish for "Saint Joachim") was named for the San Joaquin River.

== Geography ==
According to the United States Census Bureau, the city incorporates a total area of 1.2 square miles (3.1 km^{2}), all land.

== History ==
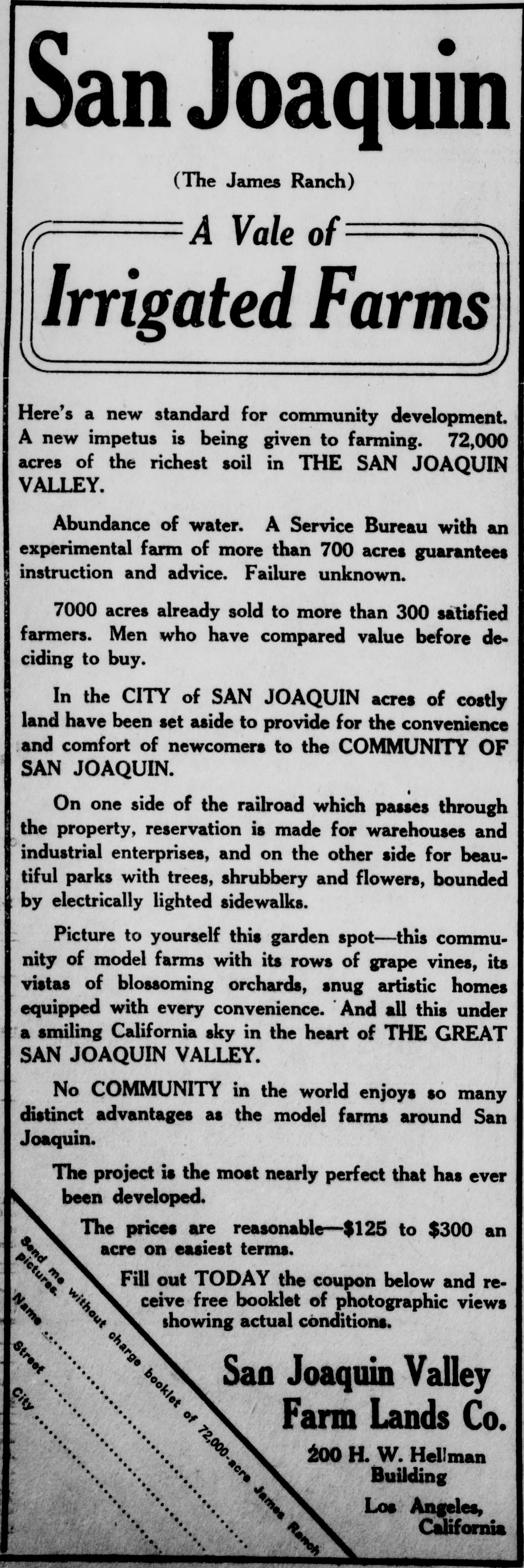
An advertisement promoting the San Joaquin Valley Farm Lands Company, August 1913. "In the CITY of SAN JOAQUIN acres of costly land have been set aside to provide for the convenience and comfort of newcomers...".

The city is located within what was once the James Ranch, owned by Jefferson G. James (1829–1910). In 1912, the 76,000 acre ranch was bought by Benjamin F. Graham (1868–1935), who announced his intent to sell it in 60-to-80 acre tracts. The nucleus of the land development project would be a new city near Tranquillity, named "Graham", for which construction began immediately, including an announced plan for a railroad spur line leading to it to be laid "within two weeks".

On April 16, 1913, a post office named "Grahamton" opened there, but two days later its name was changed to "San Joaquin". The city and associated development continued to be promoted as "Graham" until about August of that year, after which it was referred to as "San Joaquin".

San Joaquin was incorporated in 1920, becoming the tenth incorporated municipality in the county.

== Demographics ==
Historical population
Census	Pop.	Note	%±
1930	163		—
1940	240		47.2%
1950	632		163.3%
1960	879		39.1%
1970	1,506		71.3%
1980	1,930		28.2%
1990	2,311		19.7%
2000	3,270		41.5%
2010	4,001		22.4%
2020	3,701		−7.5%
U.S. Decennial Census

=== 2020 census ===
As of the 2020 census, San Joaquin had a population of 3,701. The population density was 3,091.9 inhabitants per square mile (1,193.8/km^{2}). The median age was 26.5 years. The age distribution was 35.9% under the age of 18, 12.1% aged 18 to 24, 23.9% aged 25 to 44, 20.2% aged 45 to 64, and 7.9% who were 65 years of age or older. For every 100 females, there were 95.8 males, and for every 100 females age 18 and over there were 95.9 males.

The whole population lived in households. There were 904 households, out of which 63.6% had children under the age of 18 living in them. Of all households, 57.2% were married-couple households, 4.6% were cohabiting couple households, 12.8% were households with a male householder and no spouse or partner present, and 25.3% were households with a female householder and no spouse or partner present. 8.0% of households were one person, and 4.4% were one person aged 65 or older. The average household size was 4.09. There were 811 families (89.7% of all households).

There were 937 housing units at an average density of 782.8 units per square mile (302.2 units/km^{2}), of which 904 (96.5%) were occupied. Of these, 45.8% were owner-occupied, and 54.2% were occupied by renters. 3.5% of housing units were vacant. The homeowner vacancy rate was 0.0% and the rental vacancy rate was 2.2%.

0.0% of residents lived in urban areas, while 100.0% lived in rural areas.

Racial composition as of the 2020 census
Race	Number	Percent
White	810	21.9%
Black or African American	35	0.9%
American Indian and Alaska Native	60	1.6%
Asian	8	0.2%
Native Hawaiian and Other Pacific Islander	3	0.1%
Some other race	2,210	59.7%
Two or more races	575	15.5%
Hispanic or Latino (of any race)	3,540	95.6%

=== Income and poverty ===
In 2023, the US Census Bureau estimated that the median household income was $51,591, and the per capita income was $13,350. About 35.8% of families and 35.8% of the population were below the poverty line.

=== 2010 census ===
At the 2010 census San Joaquin had a population of 4,001. The population density was 3,485.3 inhabitants per square mile (1,345.7/km^{2}). The racial makeup of San Joaquin was 1,966 (49.1%) White, 31 (0.8%) African American, 54 (1.3%) Native American, 37 (0.9%) Asian, 0 (0.0%) Pacific Islander, 1,766 (44.1%) from other races, and 147 (3.7%) from two or more races. Hispanic or Latino of any race were 3,825 persons (95.6%).

The whole population lived in households, no one lived in non-institutionalized group quarters and no one was institutionalized.

There were 882 households, 660 (74.8%) had children under the age of 18 living in them, 601 (68.1%) were opposite-sex married couples living together, 163 (18.5%) had a female householder with no husband present, 51 (5.8%) had a male householder with no wife present. There were 47 (5.3%) unmarried opposite-sex partnerships, and 1 (0.1%) same-sex married couples or partnerships. 48 households (5.4%) were one person and 20 (2.3%) had someone living alone who was 65 or older. The average household size was 4.54. There were 815 families (92.4% of households); the average family size was 4.66.

The age distribution was 1,652 people (41.3%) under the age of 18, 428 people (10.7%) aged 18 to 24, 1,100 people (27.5%) aged 25 to 44, 646 people (16.1%) aged 45 to 64, and 175 people (4.4%) who were 65 or older. The median age was 23.6 years. For every 100 females, there were 103.0 males. For every 100 females age 18 and over, there were 106.6 males.

There were 934 housing units at an average density of 813.6 per square mile (314.1/km^{2}), of which 882 were occupied, 406 (46.0%) by the owners and 476 (54.0%) by renters. The homeowner vacancy rate was 1.9%; the rental vacancy rate was 6.3%. 1,997 people (49.9% of the population) lived in owner-occupied housing units and 2,004 people (50.1%) lived in rental housing units.

== Government ==
San Joaquin utilizes a council–manager form of government and uses a city council with five council members that appoints the mayor. As of March 2022, the current mayor of San Joaquin is Adam F Cornejo.

In the United States House of Representatives, San Joaquin is in California's 13th congressional district and is represented by Democrat Adam Gray.

== Education ==
San Joaquin is served by the Golden Plains Unified School District.

In a county dominated by the agriculture industry, San Joaquin residents mostly work on farms. The city suffers from poverty, and poor educational standards and achievements. According to New York Times columnist David Brooks, in 2013, only "2.9 percent of the residents have bachelor's degrees and 20.6 percent have high school degrees." Brooks believes these factors will prevent long-term economic development and poverty alleviation.
