= Cruz Bustamante =

American politician (born 1953)

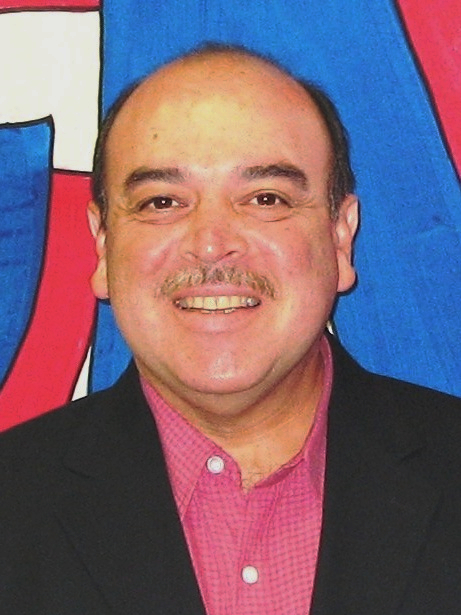
- Bustamante in 2006

45th Lieutenant Governor of California
- In office January 4, 1999 – January 8, 2007
- Governor: Gray Davis; Arnold Schwarzenegger
- Preceded by: Gray Davis
- Succeeded by: John Garamendi

62nd Speaker of the California State Assembly
- In office December 2, 1996 – February 26, 1998
- Preceded by: Curt Pringle
- Succeeded by: Antonio Villaraigosa

Member of the California State Assembly from the 31st district
- In office April 29, 1993 – November 30, 1998
- Preceded by: Bruce Bronzan
- Succeeded by: Sarah Reyes

Personal details
- Born: Cruz Miguel Bustamante; January 4, 1953 (age 73) Dinuba, California, U.S.
- Party: Democratic
- Spouse: Arcelia
- Children: 3
- Education: Fresno City College (attended); California State University, Fresno (BA)

Cruz Miguel Bustamante (born January 4, 1953) is an American politician who served as the 45th lieutenant governor of California from 1999 to 2007 under governors Gray Davis and Arnold Schwarzenegger. A member of the Democratic Party, Bustamante previously served in the California State Assembly and was its speaker from 1996 to 1998.

== Early life and education ==
The eldest of six children, Cruz Bustamante was born in Dinuba, California. His family later moved to San Joaquin, California. He attended and graduated from Tranquillity High School in the 1970s, where he excelled in both football and wrestling, and later attended Fresno City College and California State University, Fresno. Bustamante earned his Bachelor of Arts via distance learning from California State University, Fresno, in 2003.

== Career ==
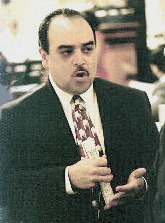
Bustamante as a member of the Assembly

As a resident of Fresno, Bustamante was elected to the California State Assembly in a special election in 1993, and became the speaker of the Assembly in 1996. He was elected lieutenant governor in 1998, the first Latino elected to statewide office in California in more than 120 years. He was also the highest-ranking Hispanic officeholder in the United States until Bill Richardson became governor of New Mexico in 2003.

=== 2003 recall election ===
He was the most prominent Democrat to run in the 2003 California recall election to remove Governor Gray Davis, and placed second to Republican Arnold Schwarzenegger, losing by 17 points. (see full election results).

Bustamante had an apparently icy relationship with Governor Davis, a fellow Democrat, during his tenure. They reportedly had not talked in months before the recall election approached. Bustamante's decision to run in the recall election was controversial, as many supporters of Governor Davis had urged prominent Democrats not to run, in an attempt to undermine the legitimacy of the event. During the recall election, Bustamante ran on a platform slogan of "No on Recall, Yes on Bustamante", indicating he opposed the recall.

=== 2006 insurance commissioner election ===
Bustamante was the Democratic nominee for California insurance commissioner in 2006. In his official candidate statement, he said "I want to become an example to others to lead healthier lives by losing weight myself. Obesity in California costs $7.7 billion a year." Bustamante claimed to have shed 43 pounds, to a weight of 235 pounds, by means of diet and exercise.

He easily won the June 6, 2006, Democratic primary, receiving 70.5% of the vote and defeating his challenger, John Kraft. Bustamante received 1,606,913 votes to 674,309 for Kraft. Many political analysts believed that Kraft, who ran a low-key campaign in which he took no campaign contributions, received those votes as a protest for Bustamante's behavior during the 2003 recall election. However, Kraft planned to actively campaign for Bustamante in the general election, and donated a significant portion of his fortune as an heir to Kraft Foods to Bustamante's campaign.

Bustamante ran against Republican Steve Poizner in November. Bustamante announced that he would not be returning insurance industry contributions to his campaign, a position criticized by Poizner and campaign ethicists. Bustamante also failed to meet a deadline to submit a campaign statement to voters. According to the Field Poll, on November 3, 2006, Bustamante trailed Poizner by 9%. and lost to Poizner by 12% in the general election.

It was speculated that Bustamante would run for the U.S. House of Representatives in California's 21st congressional district in 2012, but ultimately he did not run.

== Personal life ==
With his wife Arcelia, Bustamante has three children. After leaving office, he became a lobbyist, owning the firm Bustamante & Associates. A park in Fresno was named after Bustamante in 2026 to recognize his public service.

== Electoral history ==
Public offices
Office	Type	Location	Elected	Term began	Term ended
State Assemblyman	Legislature	Sacramento	1993	May 3, 1993	December 5, 1994
State Assemblyman	Legislature	Sacramento	1994	December 5, 1994	December 2, 1996
Speaker of the Assembly	Legislature	Sacramento	1996	December 2, 1996	December 7, 1998
Lieutenant Governor	Executive	Sacramento	1998	January 4, 1999	January 6, 2003
Lieutenant Governor	Executive	Sacramento	2002	January 6, 2003	January 8, 2007

California State Assembly service
Session	Majority	Governor	Committees	District
1993–1994	Democratic	Pete Wilson		31
1995–1996	Republican	Pete Wilson		31
1997–1998	Democratic	Pete Wilson		31

California Lieutenant Governor general election, 1998
Party	Candidate	Votes	%
Democratic	Cruz Bustamante	4,290,473	52.7
Republican	Tim Leslie	3,161,031	38.8
Green	Sara Amir	247,897	3.0
Libertarian	Thomas M. Tryon	167,523	2.1
Peace and Freedom	Jaime Luis Gomez	109,888	1.3
American Independent	George M. McCoy	92,349	1.1
Reform	James G. Mangia	74,180	0.9
Total votes		8,143,341	
Majority		1,129,442	13.9
Democratic hold			

California Lieutenant Governor general election, 2002
Party	Candidate	Votes	%	±%
Democratic	Cruz Bustamante (incumbent)	3,658,942	49.4	−3.3
Republican	Bruce McPherson	3,094,392	41.8	+3.0
Green	Donna Warren	307,254	4.1	+1.1
Libertarian	Pat Wright	107,127	1.4	−0.7
American Independent	James King	93,026	1.3	+0.2
Reform	Paul Jerry Hanosh	82,053	1.1	+0.2
Natural Law	Kalee Przybylak	68,366	0.9	+0.9
Total votes		7,411,160		
Majority		564,550	7.6	−6.3
Democratic hold		Swing	−6.3	

California gubernatorial recall election, 2003
Party	Candidate	Votes	%
Republican	Arnold Schwarzenegger	4,206,284	48.6
Democratic	Cruz Bustamante	2,724,874	31.5
Republican	Tom McClintock	1,161,287	13.5
Green	Peter Miguel Camejo	242,247	2.8

California Insurance Commissioner primary election, 2006
Party	Candidate	Votes	%
Democratic	Cruz Bustamante	1,651,858	70.4
Democratic	John Kraft	693,662	29.6
Total votes		2,345,520	
Majority		958,196	40.8

California Insurance Commissioner general election, 2006
Party	Candidate	Votes	%
Republican	Steve Poizner	4,233,986	50.8
Democratic	Cruz Bustamante	3,204,536	38.5
Libertarian	Dale Ogden	305,772	3.7
Green	Larry Cafiero	270,218	3.2
Peace and Freedom	Tom Condit	187,618	2.3
American Independent	Jay Earl Burden	127,267	1.5
Total votes		8,329,397	
Majority		1,029,450	12.3
Republican gain from Democratic			

== See also ==
- List of minority governors and lieutenant governors in the United States

California Assembly
Preceded by Curt Pringle	Speaker of the California Assembly; 1996–1998	Succeeded by Antonio Villaraigosa
Party political offices
Preceded by Gray Davis	Democratic nominee for Lieutenant Governor of California; 1998, 2002	Succeeded by John Garamendi
Preceded by Gray Davis	Democratic nominee for Governor of California; 2003	Succeeded by Phil Angelides
Preceded by John Garamendi	Democratic nominee for Insurance Commissioner of California; 2006	Succeeded by Dave Jones
Political offices
Preceded by Gray Davis	Lieutenant Governor of California; 1999–2007	Succeeded by John Garamendi
