= George Radanovich =

American politician (born 1955)

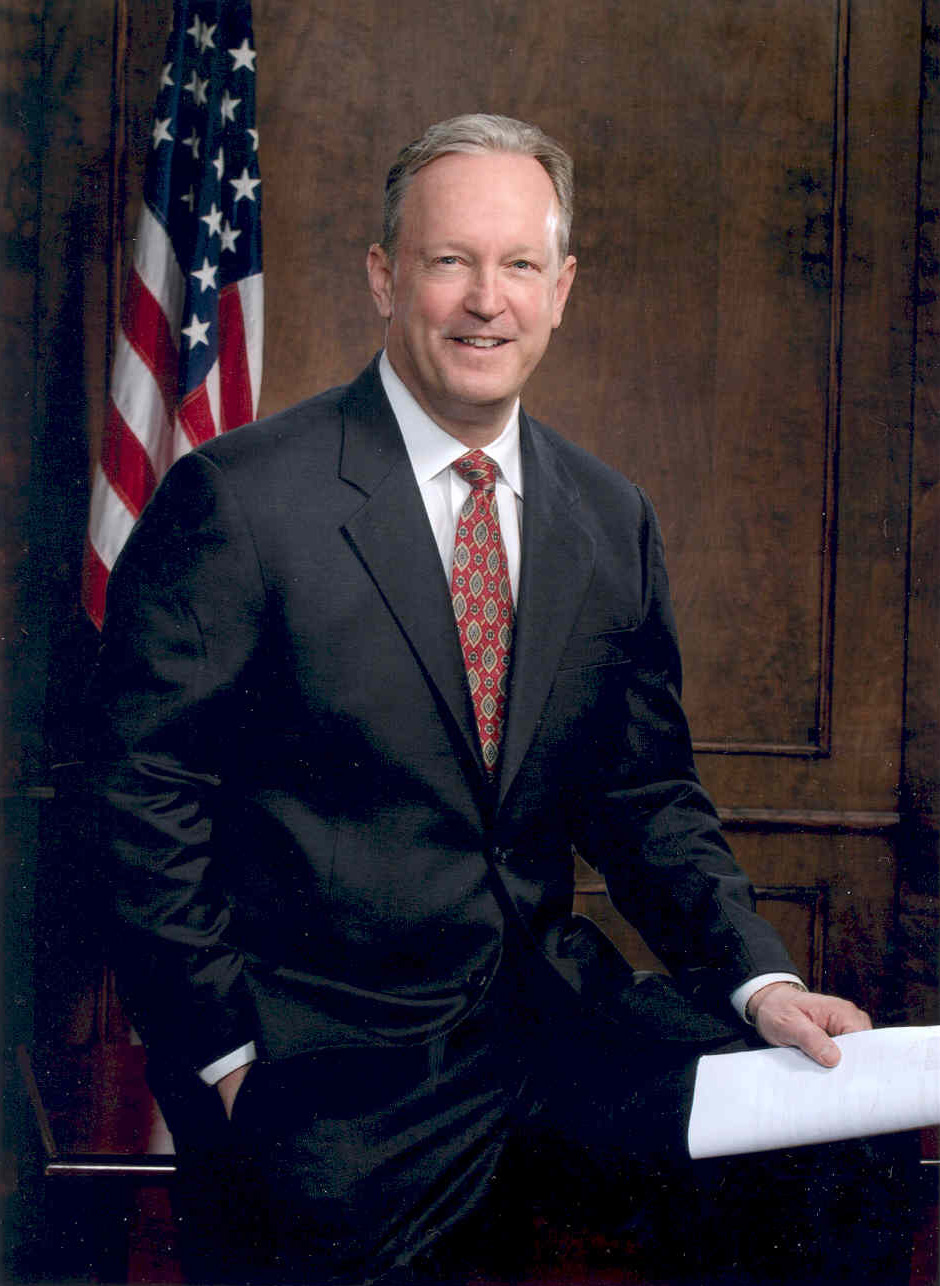

Member of the U.S. House of Representatives from California's 19th district
- In office January 3, 1995 – January 3, 2011
- Preceded by: Richard Lehman
- Succeeded by: Jeff Denham

Personal details
- Born: George Purdy Radanovich; June 20, 1955 (age 71) Mariposa, California, U.S.
- Party: Republican
- Spouse: Ethie Weaver (m. 1996; died 2010)
- Children: 1
- Education: California Polytechnic State University, San Luis Obispo (BS)

George Purdy Radanovich (born June 20, 1955) is an American politician and former U.S. representative for California's 19th congressional district, serving from 1995 to 2011. The district includes most of northern Fresno, as well as several rural areas northeast of the city. He did not seek reelection in 2010. He is a member of the Republican Party.

== Background ==
Radanovich was born in Mariposa, California to a Catholic family of Croatian extraction.

He was educated at California Polytechnic State University, San Luis Obispo. After college, he performed a variety of jobs, including work as a banker, substitute teacher, and construction worker. He began growing grapes in his native Mariposa County in 1982, after observing a microclimate in the area suitable for their growth. In 1986, he opened the Radanovich Winery, the first winery in the region. He was a member of the Mariposa County Board of Supervisors from 1988 to 1992, serving as chairman in 1991. He first ran for Congress in 1992 after his home in Mariposa was shifted to the 19th District, and lost in the Republican primary to Fresno businessman Tal Cloud.

=== Congress ===
Radanovich won the Republican primary in 1994. In the general election, Radanovich faced six-term incumbent Democrat Richard H. Lehman in the following November election. Lehman had only defeated Cloud by 1,100 votes in the previous election cycle, and speculation had abounded that the 19th would not stay Democratic for long. Radanovich defeated Lehman by a shocking 17-point margin (56 percent to Lehman's 39 percent). It was one of the largest margins of defeat for an incumbent in a cycle that saw many tenured Democrats lose their seats.

According to Wine Spectator, in 2003 Congressman Radanovich closed Radanovich Winery due to “the tough economic times currently facing many California wineries, the congressman said on Friday. "It has been a painful decision," said Radanovich, 47. "The past six months have been some of the most difficult that I've been through." SFGate reported on this as well saying, “Radanovich cited the current wine oversupply situation facing California vintners, the economic situation and his desire to focus on his job in Washington. The winery's tasting room has closed and some winery inventory will be sold to pay outstanding debts.”

In the 2006 election, Radanovich ran against chemical engineer T. J. Cox, who ran unopposed in the Democratic primary. Cox was arguably Radanovich's most serious and well-funded challenger since his 1994 election. However, Michael Der Manouel Jr. commented on Cox's chances for election by saying, "Cox could spend $10 million and Nancy Pelosi could spend another $10 million and Congressman Radanovich wouldn't lose." Radanovich was reelected with 60% of the vote in 2006 and was unopposed for reelection in 2008 in what is now considered one of the most Republican districts in California. Cox was later elected to Congress in the 21st district in the 2018 elections.

On December 29, 2009, Radanovich announced he would not seek reelection in 2010.

== Life after congress ==
In 2022, Radanovich ran for California's 4th State Senate district. He was eliminated when he placed third in the primary.

In 2024, Radanovich placed first in the primary election for California's 8th Assembly district, but lost to fellow Republican David Tangipa in the general election.

== Votes and positions ==
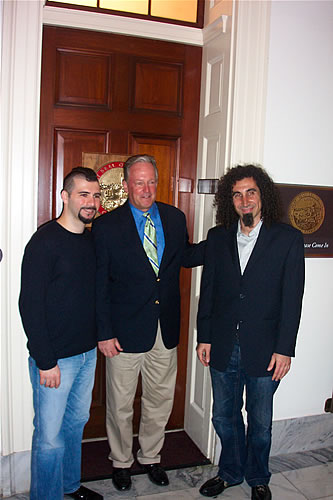
Radanovich alongside members of the band System of a Down.

He was president of the Republican freshman class of 1994, has signed the Taxpayer Protection Pledge, and is a member of the Republican Study Committee.

- October 6, 2005: Voted for the Department of Homeland Security.
- December 14, 2005: Voted to reauthorize the Patriot Act.
- June 16, 2006: Voted to reject timetables for withdrawal from Iraq.
- September 29, 2008: Voted for the "Emergency Economic Stabilization Act of 2008" (Paulson Bailout Bill).

== Committee assignments ==
- Committee on Energy and Commerce
  - Subcommittee on Communications, Technology and the Internet
  - Subcommittee on Commerce, Trade and Consumer Protection (Ranking Member)
  - Subcommittee on Oversight and Investigations

=== Caucuses ===
- Water Caucus (Co-Chair)
- Congressional Wine Caucus (Co-Chair)
- Congressional Croatian Caucus (Co-Chair)

== Family ==
He was married to Ethie Weaver Radanovich from November 1996 until her death from ovarian cancer on February 4, 2010. They have one son, King.

== Electoral history ==
1994 United States House of Representatives elections in California
Party	Candidate	Votes	%
Republican	George Radanovich	104,435	56.78
Democratic	Richard Lehman (Incumbent)	72,912	39.64
Libertarian	Dolores Comstock	6,579	3.58
Total votes		183,926	100.0
Turnout			
Republican gain from Democratic			

1996 United States House of Representatives elections in California
Party	Candidate	Votes	%
Republican	George Radanovich (Incumbent)	137,402	66.6
Democratic	Paul Barile	58,452	28.4
Libertarian	Pamela Pescosolido	6,083	2.9
Natural Law	David Adalian	4,442	2.1
Total votes		206,379	100.0
Turnout			
Republican hold			

1998 United States House of Representatives elections in California
Party	Candidate	Votes	%
Republican	George Radanovich (Incumbent)	131,105	79.39
Democratic	Paul Barile	34,044	20.61
Total votes		165,149	100.0
Turnout			
Republican hold			

2000 United States House of Representatives elections in California
Party	Candidate	Votes	%
Republican	George Radanovich (Incumbent)	144,517	65.0
Democratic	Dan Rosenberg	70,578	31.8
Libertarian	Elizabeth Taylor	4,264	1.9
Natural Law	Bob Miller	1,990	0.8
American Independent	Edmon V. Kaiser	1,266	0.5
Total votes		222,615	100.0
Turnout			
Republican hold			

2002 United States House of Representatives elections in California
Party	Candidate	Votes	%
Republican	George Radanovich (Incumbent)	106,209	67.4
Democratic	John Veen	47,403	30.0
Libertarian	Patrick Lee McHargue	4,190	2.6
Total votes		157,802	100.0
Turnout			
Republican hold			

2004 United States House of Representatives elections in California
Party	Candidate	Votes	%
Republican	George Radanovich (Incumbent)	155,354	66.1
Democratic	James Lex Bufford	79,970	27.2
Green	Larry R. Mullen	15,863	6.7
Total votes		251,187	100.0
Turnout			
Republican hold			

2006 United States House of Representatives elections in California
Party	Candidate	Votes	%
Republican	George Radanovich (Incumbent)	110,246	60.6
Democratic	T.J. Cox	71,748	39.4
Total votes		181,994	100.0
Turnout			
Republican hold			

2008 United States House of Representatives elections in California
Party	Candidate	Votes	%
Republican	George Radanovich (Incumbent)	179,245	98.43
Democratic	Peter Leinau (write-in)	2,490	1.37
Independent	Phil Rockey (write-in)	366	0.20
Total votes		182,101	100.00
Turnout			51.19
Republican hold			

U.S. House of Representatives
Preceded by Richard Lehman	Member of the U.S. House of Representatives from California's 19th congressional district 1995–2011	Succeeded by Jeff Denham
U.S. order of precedence (ceremonial)
Preceded by Jane Harman as Former U.S. Representative	Order of precedence of the United States as Former U.S. Representative	Succeeded by Gary Miller as Former U.S. Representative
