= California's 19th congressional district =

U.S. House district for California

Coordinates: 37.6°N 120°W

- Interactive map of district boundaries
- Representative: Jimmy Panetta; D–Carmel Valley
- Population (2025): 748,765
- Median household income: $130,091
- Ethnicity: 48.3% White; 24.6% Hispanic; 18.7% Asian; 5.1% Two or more races; 2.1% Black; 1.2% other
- Cook PVI: D+18

California's 19th congressional district is a congressional district in the U.S. state of California, currently represented by Democrat Jimmy Panetta.

Following redistricting in 2021, the district includes most of the wealthier, white portions of the Central Coast, including Santa Cruz County (excluding most of majority-Hispanic Watsonville) and parts of Santa Clara County, Monterey County and San Luis Obispo County. The new 19th district includes the south side of San Jose and the entire cities of Santa Cruz, Monterey, Seaside, Paso Robles, and Atascadero. Most of the area was previously part of the 20th district, which moved to the Central Valley.

For much of the 20th century prior to the early 1990s, the district had encompassed areas to the south and much of Los Angeles County, California. Gradually it was redefined to take in central and northern counties instead.

== Recent election results from statewide races ==
=== 2023–2027 boundaries ===
Year	Office	Results
2008	President	Obama 68% - 32%
2010	Governor	Brown 59% - 37%
2010	Lt. Governor	Newsom 55% - 38%
2010	Secretary of State	Bowen 58% - 33%
2010	Attorney General	Harris 52% - 39%
2010	Treasurer	Lockyer 61% - 31%
2010	Controller	Chiang 59% - 32%
2012	President	Obama 67% - 33%
2014	Governor	Brown 69% - 31%
2016	President	Clinton 66% - 27%
2018	Governor	Newsom 66% - 34%
2018	Attorney General	Becerra 67% - 33%
2020	President	Biden 69% - 29%
2022	Senate (Reg.)	Padilla 67% - 33%
2022	Governor	Newsom 65% - 35%
2022	Lt. Governor	Kounalakis 66% - 34%
2022	Secretary of State	Weber 66% - 34%
2022	Attorney General	Bonta 65% - 35%
2022	Treasurer	Ma 65% - 35%
2022	Controller	Cohen 61% - 39%
2024	President	Harris 65% - 31%
2024	Senate (Reg.)	Schiff 66% - 34%

=== 2027–2033 boundaries ===
Year	Office	Results
2008	President	Obama 68% - 32%
2010	Governor	Brown 59% - 37%
2010	Lt. Governor	Newsom 55% - 38%
2010	Secretary of State	Bowen 58% - 33%
2010	Attorney General	Harris 52% - 39%
2010	Treasurer	Lockyer 61% - 31%
2010	Controller	Chiang 59% - 32%
2012	President	Obama 67% - 33%
2014	Governor	Brown 69% - 31%
2016	President	Clinton 66% - 27%
2018	Governor	Newsom 66% - 34%
2018	Attorney General	Becerra 67% - 33%
2020	President	Biden 69% - 29%
2022	Senate (Reg.)	Padilla 67% - 33%
2022	Governor	Newsom 65% - 35%
2022	Lt. Governor	Kounalakis 66% - 34%
2022	Secretary of State	Weber 66% - 34%
2022	Attorney General	Bonta 65% - 35%
2022	Treasurer	Ma 65% - 35%
2022	Controller	Cohen 61% - 39%
2024	President	Harris 65% - 31%
2024	Senate (Reg.)	Schiff 66% - 34%

== Composition ==
FIPS County Code	County	Seat	Population
53	Monterey	Salinas	430,723
79	San Luis Obispo	San Luis Obispo	281,639
85	Santa Clara	San Jose	1,877,592
87	Santa Cruz	Santa Cruz	261,547

Under the 2020 redistricting, California's 19th congressional district is located on the Central Coast, encompassing most of Santa Cruz County, the interior of Santa Clara County, the north of San Luis Obispo County, and the coast of Monterey County. The area in Santa Clara County includes the southwest section of the city of San Jose. The area in Monterey County includes most of the census-designated place of Prunedale; part of the census-designated place of Castroville; the cities of Monterey, Seaside, Pacific Grove, Marina, Sand City, Del Rey Oaks, the town of Carmel-by-the-Sea; and the census-designated places Moss Landing, Elkhorn, Del Monte Forest, Carmel Valley Village, and Spreckels. The area in San Luis Obispo County includes the cities of Atascadero and Paso Robles; and the census-designated places San Simeon, Cambria, Oak Shores, Lake Nacimiento, San Miguel, Templeton, Creston, Whitley Gardens, and Shandon. The area in Santa Cruz County includes a small section of the city of Watsonville; the cities of Santa Cruz, Scotts Valley, and Capitola; and the census designated places Boulder Creek, Brookdale, Lompico, Zayante, Davenport, Bonny Doon, Felton, Ben Lomond, Mount Hermon, Paradise Park, Pasatiempo, Twin Lakes, Live Oak, Pleasure Point, Soquel, Day Valley, Aptos, Seacliff, Rio del Mar, Corralitos, Aptos Hills-Larkin Valley, La Selva Beach, and Pajaro Dunes.

Santa Clara County is split between this county, the 16th district, and the 18th district. The 19th and 16th are partitioned by Old Santa Cruz Highway, Aldercroft Hts Rd, Weaver Rd, Soda Springs Rd, Love Harris Rd, Pheasant Creek, Guadalupe Creek, Guadalupe Mines Rd, Oak Canyon Dr, Coleman Rd, Meridian Ave, Highway G8, Guadalupe River, W Capitol Expressway, Senter Rd, Sylvandale Ave, Yerba Buena Rd, Silver Creek Rd, and E Capitol Expressway. The 19th and 18th are partitioned by Pajaro River, Highway 129, W Beach St, Lee Rd, Highway 1, Harkins Slough Rd, Harkins Slough, Old Adobe Rd, Corralitos Creek, Varin Rd, Pioneer Rd, Green Valley Rd, Casserly Rd, Mt Madonna Rd.

Monterey County is split between this district and the 18th district. They are partitioned by Union Pacific, Highway G12, Elkhorn Rd, Echo Valley Rd, Maher Rd, Maher Ct, La Encina Dr, Crazy Horse Canyon Rd, San Juan Grade Rd, Highway 101, Espinosa Rd, Castroville Blvd, Highway 156, Highway 1, Tembladero Slough, Highway 183, Cooper Rd, Blanco Rd, Salinas River, Davis Rd, Hitchcock Rd, Highway 68, E Blanco Rd, Nutting St, Abbott St, Highway G17, Limekiln Creek, Likekiln Rd, Rana Creek, Tularcitos Creek, Highway G16, Tassajara Rd, Camp Creek, Lost Valley Creek, Lost Valley Conn, N Coast Rdg, 2 Central Coa, Cone Peak Rd, Nacimiento Fergusson Rd, Los Bueyes Creek, and the Monterey County Southern border.

San Luis Obispo County is split between this district and the 24th district. They are partitioned by Highway 1, Cayucos Creek Rd, Thunder Canyon Rd, Old Creek Rd, Santa Rita Rd, Tara Creek, Fuentes Rd, Highway 41, San Miguel Rd, Palo Verde Rd, Old Morro Rd, Los Osos Rd, San Rafael Rd, Atascadero Ave, San Antonio Rd, N Santa Margarita Rd, Santa Clara Rd, Rocky Canyon Truck Trail, Highway 229, Lion Ridge Rd, O'Donovan Rd, Highway 58, Calf Canyon Highway, La Panza Rd, Upton Canyon Rd, Camatta Creek Rd, San Juan Creek, and Bitterwater Rd.

Santa Cruz County is split between this district and the 18th district. They are partitioned by Pajaro River, Highway 129, W Beach St, Lee Rd, Highway 1, Harkins Slough Rd, Harkins Slough, Old Adobe Rd, Corralitos Creek, Varin Rd, Pioneer Rd, Green Valley Rd, Casserly Rd, Mt Madonna Rd.

=== Cities and CDPs with 10,000 or more people ===
- San Jose – 971,233
- Santa Cruz – 64,075
- Watsonville – 52,590
- Seaside – 32,366
- Paso Robles – 31,490
- Monterey – 30,218
- Atascadero – 29,773
- Marina – 22,359
- Prunedale – 18,885
- Live Oak – 17,038
- Pacific Grove – 15,090
- Scotts Valley – 12,224

=== 2,500 – 10,000 people ===
- Soquel – 9,980
- Rio del Mar – 9,128
- Capitola – 9,456
- Templeton – 8,386
- Cstroville – 7,515
- Aptos – 6,664
- Ben Lomond – 6,337
- Pleasure Point – 5,821
- Cambria – 5,658
- Boulder Creek – 5,429
- Twin Lakes – 4,944
- Carmel Valley Village – 4,524
- Felton – 4,489
- Del Monte Forest – 4,204
- Day Valley – 3,410
- Seacliff – 3,280
- Carmel-by-the-Sea – 3,220
- San Miguel – 3,172
- Lake Nacimiento – 2,956
- Bonny Doon – 2,868
- La Selva Beach – 2,531

== List of members representing the district ==
Member	Party	Dates	Cong ress	Electoral history	Counties
District created March 4, 1933
Sam L. Collins (Fullerton)	Republican	March 4, 1933 – January 3, 1937	73rd 74th	Elected in 1932. Re-elected in 1934. Lost re-election.	1933–1943; Orange, Riverside, San Bernardino
Harry R. Sheppard (Yucaipa)	Democratic	January 3, 1937 – January 3, 1943	75th 76th 77th	Elected in 1936. Re-elected in 1938. Re-elected in 1940. Redistricted to the 21st district.	1933–1943; Orange, Riverside, San Bernardino
Chester E. Holifield (Montebello)	Democratic	January 3, 1943 – December 31, 1974	78th 79th 80th 81st 82nd 83rd 84th 85th 86th 87th 88th 89th 90th 91st 92nd 93rd	Elected in 1942. Re-elected in 1944. Re-elected in 1946. Re-elected in 1948. Re-elected in 1950. Re-elected in 1952. Re-elected in 1954. Re-elected in 1956. Re-elected in 1958. Re-elected in 1960. Re-elected in 1962. Re-elected in 1964. Re-elected in 1966. Re-elected in 1968. Re-elected in 1970. Re-elected in 1972. Retired and resigned early.	1943–1975; Los Angeles
Vacant		December 31, 1974 – January 3, 1975	93rd		1943–1975; Los Angeles
Robert J. Lagomarsino (Ventura)	Republican	January 3, 1975 – January 3, 1993	94th 95th 96th 97th 98th 99th 100th 101st 102nd	Redistricted from the 13th district and re-elected in 1974. Re-elected in 1976. Re-elected in 1978. Re-elected in 1980. Re-elected in 1982. Re-elected in 1984. Re-elected in 1986. Re-elected in 1988. Re-elected in 1990. Redistricted to the 22nd district and lost nomination.	1975–1983; Southern San Luis Obispo, Santa Barbara, western Ventura
Robert J. Lagomarsino (Ventura)	Republican	January 3, 1975 – January 3, 1993	94th 95th 96th 97th 98th 99th 100th 101st 102nd	Redistricted from the 13th district and re-elected in 1974. Re-elected in 1976. Re-elected in 1978. Re-elected in 1980. Re-elected in 1982. Re-elected in 1984. Re-elected in 1986. Re-elected in 1988. Re-elected in 1990. Redistricted to the 22nd district and lost nomination.	1983–1993; Santa Barbara, Ventura
Richard H. Lehman (North Fork)	Democratic	January 3, 1993 – January 3, 1995	103rd	Redistricted from the 18th district and re-elected in 1992. Lost re-election.	1993–2003; Eastern Fresno, Madera, Mariposa, northern Tulare
George Radanovich (Mariposa)	Republican	January 3, 1995 – January 3, 2011	104th 105th 106th 107th 108th 109th 110th 111th	Elected in 1994. Re-elected in 1996. Re-elected in 1998. Re-elected in 2000. Re-elected in 2002. Re-elected in 2004. Re-elected in 2006. Re-elected in 2008. Retired.	1993–2003; Eastern Fresno, Madera, Mariposa, northern Tulare
George Radanovich (Mariposa)	Republican	January 3, 1995 – January 3, 2011	104th 105th 106th 107th 108th 109th 110th 111th	Elected in 1994. Re-elected in 1996. Re-elected in 1998. Re-elected in 2000. Re-elected in 2002. Re-elected in 2004. Re-elected in 2006. Re-elected in 2008. Retired.	2003–2013 Northern Fresno, Mariposa, Madera, eastern Stanislaus, Tuolumne
Jeff Denham (Atwater)	Republican	January 3, 2011 – January 3, 2013	112th	Elected in 2010. Redistricted to the 10th district.	2003–2013 Northern Fresno, Mariposa, Madera, eastern Stanislaus, Tuolumne
Zoe Lofgren (San Jose)	Democratic	January 3, 2013 – January 3, 2023	113th 114th 115th 116th 117th	Redistricted from the 16th district and re-elected in 2012. Re-elected in 2014. Re-elected in 2016. Re-elected in 2018. Re-elected in 2020. Redistricted to the 18th district.	2013–2023 Santa Clara
Jimmy Panetta (Carmel Valley)	Democratic	January 3, 2023 – present	118th 119th	Redistricted from the 20th district and re-elected in 2022. Re-elected in 2024. Re-elected in 2026.	2023–present Monterey and San Benito counties, most of Santa Cruz County, and portions of Santa Clara County

== Election results ==
=== 1932 ===
1932 United States House of Representatives elections in California
Party	Candidate	Votes	%
Republican	Sam L. Collins	56,889	51.0
Democratic	B. Z. McKinney	51,796	46.4
Liberty	Horatio S. Hoard	2,873	2.6
Total votes		111,558	100.0
Turnout			
Republican win (new seat)			

=== 1934 ===
1934 United States House of Representatives elections in California
Party	Candidate	Votes	%
Republican	Sam L. Collins (Incumbent)	97,119	88.8
No party	A. B. Hillabold (write-in)	12,301	11.2
Total votes		109,420	100.0
Turnout			
Republican hold			

=== 1936 ===
1936 United States House of Representatives elections in California
Party	Candidate	Votes	%
Democratic	Harry R. Sheppard	70,339	53.8
Republican	Sam L. Collins (Incumbent)	59,071	45.2
Communist	Charles McLauchlan	1,336	1.0
Total votes		130,746	100.0
Turnout			
Democratic gain from Republican			

=== 1938 ===
1938 United States House of Representatives elections in California
Party	Candidate	Votes	%
Democratic	Harry R. Sheppard (Incumbent)	75,819	53.3
Republican	C. T. Johnson	66,402	46.7
Total votes		142,221	100.0
Turnout			
Democratic hold			

=== 1940 ===
1940 United States House of Representatives elections in California
Party	Candidate	Votes	%
Democratic	Harry R. Sheppard (Incumbent)	84,931	52.9
Republican	Lotus H. Loudon	75,495	47.1
Total votes		160,426	100.0
Turnout			
Democratic hold			

=== 1942 ===
1942 United States House of Representatives elections in California
Party	Candidate	Votes	%
Democratic	Chet Holifield	34,918	63.1
Republican	Carlton H. Casjens	20,446	36.9
Total votes		55,374	100.0
Turnout			
Democratic win (new seat)			

=== 1944 ===
1944 United States House of Representatives elections in California
Party	Candidate	Votes	%
Democratic	Chet Holifield (Incumbent)	65,758	71.8
Republican	Carlton H. Casjens	25,852	28.2
Total votes		91,610	100.0
Turnout			
Democratic hold			

=== 1946 ===
1946 United States House of Representatives elections in California
Party	Candidate	Votes	%
Democratic	Chet Holifield (Incumbent)	50,666	97.6
Independent	Marshall J. Morrill (write-in)	1,248	2.4
Total votes		51,914	100.0
Turnout			
Democratic hold			

=== 1948 ===
1948 United States House of Representatives elections in California
Party	Candidate	Votes	%
Democratic	Chet Holifield (Incumbent)	72,900	69.7
Republican	Joseph Francis Quigley	28,698	27.5
Progressive	Jacob Berman	1,915	1.8
Independent	Myra Tanner Weiss	1,013	1.0
Total votes		104,526	100.0
Turnout			
Democratic hold			

=== 1950 ===
1950 United States House of Representatives elections in California
Party	Candidate	Votes	%
Democratic	Chet Holifield (Incumbent)	73,317	90.9
Independent	Myra Tanner Weiss	7,329	9.1
Total votes		80,646	100.0
Turnout			
Democratic hold			

=== 1952 ===
1952 United States House of Representatives elections in California
Party	Candidate	Votes	%
Democratic	Chet Holifield (Incumbent)	126,606	87.1
Progressive	Ida Alvarez	13,724	9.4
Independent	Milton Snipper	4,959	3.5
Total votes		145,289	100.0
Turnout			
Democratic hold			

=== 1954 ===
1954 United States House of Representatives elections in California
Party	Candidate	Votes	%
Democratic	Chet Holifield (Incumbent)	90,269	74.8
Republican	Raymond R. Pritchard	30,404	25.2
Total votes		120,673	100.0
Turnout			
Democratic hold			

=== 1956 ===
1956 United States House of Representatives elections in California
Party	Candidate	Votes	%
Democratic	Chet Holifield (Incumbent)	116,287	73.8
Republican	Roy E. Reynolds	41,269	26.2
Total votes		157,556	100.0
Turnout			
Democratic hold			

=== 1958 ===
1958 United States House of Representatives elections in California
Party	Candidate	Votes	%
Democratic	Chet Holifield (Incumbent)	131,421	75.3
Republican	Roy E. Reynolds	26,092	24.7
Total votes		157,513	100.0
Turnout			
Democratic hold			

=== 1960 ===
1960 United States House of Representatives elections in California
Party	Candidate	Votes	%
Democratic	Chet Holifield (Incumbent)	145,479	78.2
Republican	Gordon S. McWilliams	40,491	21.8
Total votes		185,970	100.0
Turnout			
Democratic hold			

=== 1962 ===
1962 United States House of Representatives elections in California
Party	Candidate	Votes	%
Democratic	Chet Holifield (Incumbent)	78,436	61.6
Republican	Robert T. Ramsay	48,976	38.4
Total votes		127,412	100.0
Turnout			
Democratic hold			

=== 1964 ===
1964 United States House of Representatives elections in California
Party	Candidate	Votes	%
Democratic	Chet Holifield (Incumbent)	97,934	65.4
Republican	C. Everett Hunt	51,747	34.6
Total votes		149,681	100.0
Turnout			
Democratic hold			

=== 1966 ===
1966 United States House of Representatives elections in California
Party	Candidate	Votes	%
Democratic	Chet Holifield (Incumbent)	82,592	62.3
Republican	William R. Sutton	50,068	37.7
Total votes		132,660	100.0
Turnout			
Democratic hold			

=== 1968 ===
1968 United States House of Representatives elections in California
Party	Candidate	Votes	%
Democratic	Chet Holifield (Incumbent)	96,857	63.2
Republican	Bill Jones	52,284	34.1
American Independent	Wayne L. Cook	3,996	2.6
Total votes		153,137	100.0
Turnout			
Democratic hold			

=== 1970 ===
1970 United States House of Representatives elections in California
Party	Candidate	Votes	%
Democratic	Chet Holifield (Incumbent)	98,578	70.4
Republican	Bill Jones	41,462	29.6
Total votes		140,040	100.0
Turnout			
Democratic hold			

=== 1972 ===
1972 United States House of Representatives elections in California
Party	Candidate	Votes	%
Democratic	Chet Holifield (Incumbent)	103,823	67.2
Republican	Kenneth M. Fisher	43,034	27.9
Peace and Freedom	Joe Harris	7,588	4.9
Total votes		154,445	100.0
Turnout			
Democratic hold			

=== 1974 ===
1974 United States House of Representatives elections in California
Party	Candidate	Votes	%
Republican	Robert J. Lagomarsino (Incumbent)	84,849	56.3
Democratic	James D. Loebl	65,334	43.7
Total votes		150,183	100.0
Turnout			
Republican hold			

=== 1976 ===
1976 United States House of Representatives elections in California
Party	Candidate	Votes	%
Republican	Robert J. Lagomarsino (Incumbent)	124,201	64.4
Democratic	Dan Sisson	68,722	35.6
Total votes		192,923	100.0
Turnout			
Republican hold			

=== 1978 ===
1978 United States House of Representatives elections in California
Party	Candidate	Votes	%
Republican	Robert J. Lagomarsino (Incumbent)	123,192	71.7
Democratic	Jerry Zamos	41,672	24.3
Peace and Freedom	Milton Shiro Takei	6,887	4.0
Total votes		171,751	100.0
Turnout			
Republican hold			

=== 1980 ===
1980 United States House of Representatives elections in California
Party	Candidate	Votes	%
Republican	Robert J. Lagomarsino (Incumbent)	162,849	77.7
Democratic	Carmen Lodise	36,990	17.6
Libertarian	Jim Trotter	9,764	4.7
Total votes		209,603	100.0
Turnout			
Republican hold			

=== 1982 ===
1982 United States House of Representatives elections in California
Party	Candidate	Votes	%
Republican	Robert J. Lagomarsino (Incumbent)	112,486	61.1
Democratic	Frank Frost	66,042	35.8
Libertarian	R. C. Gordon-McCutchan	4,198	2.3
Peace and Freedom	Charles J. Zekan	1,520	0.8
Total votes		184,246	100.0
Turnout			
Republican hold			

=== 1984 ===
1984 United States House of Representatives elections in California
Party	Candidate	Votes	%
Republican	Robert J. Lagomarsino (Incumbent)	153,187	67.3
Democratic	James C. Carey Jr.	70,278	30.9
Peace and Freedom	Charles J. Zekan	4,161	1.8
Total votes		227,626	100.0
Turnout			
Republican hold			

=== 1986 ===
1986 United States House of Representatives elections in California
Party	Candidate	Votes	%
Republican	Robert J. Lagomarsino (Incumbent)	122,578	71.9
Democratic	Wayne B. Norris	45,619	26.8
Libertarian	George Hasara	2,341	1.4
Total votes		170,538	100.0
Turnout			
Republican hold			

=== 1988 ===
1988 United States House of Representatives elections in California
Party	Candidate	Votes	%
Republican	Robert J. Lagomarsino (Incumbent)	116,026	50.2
Democratic	Gary K. Hart	112,033	48.5
Libertarian	Robert Donaldson	2,865	1.2
Total votes		230,924	100.0
Turnout			
Republican hold			

=== 1990 ===
1990 United States House of Representatives elections in California
Party	Candidate	Votes	%
Republican	Robert J. Lagomarsino (Incumbent)	94,599	54.6
Democratic	Anita Perez Ferguson	76,991	44.4
No party	Lorenz (write-in)	1,655	1.0
Total votes		173,235	100.0
Turnout			
Republican hold			

=== 1992 ===
1992 United States House of Representatives elections in California
Party	Candidate	Votes	%
Democratic	Richard H. Lehman (Incumbent)	101,619	46.9
Republican	Tal L. Cloud	100,590	46.4
Peace and Freedom	Dorothy L. Wells	13,334	6.2
No party	Williams (write-in)	1,097	0.5
Total votes		216,640	100.0
Turnout			
Democratic hold			

=== 1994 ===
1994 United States House of Representatives elections in California
Party	Candidate	Votes	%
Republican	George Radanovich	104,435	56.78
Democratic	Richard Lehman (Incumbent)	72,912	39.64
Libertarian	Dolores Comstock	6,579	3.58
Total votes		183,926	100.0
Turnout			
Republican gain from Democratic			

=== 1996 ===
1996 United States House of Representatives elections in California
Party	Candidate	Votes	%
Republican	George Radanovich (Incumbent)	137,402	66.6
Democratic	Paul Barile	58,452	28.4
Libertarian	Pamela Pescosolido	6,083	2.9
Natural Law	David Adalian	4,442	2.1
Total votes		206,379	100.0
Turnout			
Republican hold			

=== 1998 ===
1998 United States House of Representatives elections in California
Party	Candidate	Votes	%
Republican	George Radanovich (Incumbent)	131,105	79.39
Democratic	Paul Barile	34,044	20.61
Total votes		165,149	100.0
Turnout			
Republican hold			

=== 2000 ===
2000 United States House of Representatives elections in California
Party	Candidate	Votes	%
Republican	George Radanovich (Incumbent)	144,517	65.0
Democratic	Dan Rosenberg	70,578	31.8
Libertarian	Elizabeth Taylor	4,264	1.9
Natural Law	Bob Miller	1,990	0.8
American Independent	Edmon V. Kaiser	1,266	0.5
Total votes		222,615	100.0
Turnout			
Republican hold			

=== 2002 ===
2002 United States House of Representatives elections in California
Party	Candidate	Votes	%
Republican	George Radanovich (Incumbent)	106,209	67.4
Democratic	John Veen	47,403	30.0
Libertarian	Patrick Lee McHargue	4,190	2.6
Total votes		157,802	100.0
Turnout			
Republican hold			

=== 2004 ===
2004 United States House of Representatives elections in California
Party	Candidate	Votes	%
Republican	George Radanovich (Incumbent)	155,354	66.1
Democratic	James Lex Bufford	79,970	27.2
Green	Larry R. Mullen	15,863	6.7
Total votes		251,187	100.0
Turnout			
Republican hold			

=== 2006 ===
2006 United States House of Representatives elections in California
Party	Candidate	Votes	%
Republican	George Radanovich (Incumbent)	110,246	60.6
Democratic	T.J. Cox	71,748	39.4
Total votes		181,994	100.0
Turnout			
Republican hold			

=== 2008 ===
2008 United States House of Representatives elections in California
Party	Candidate	Votes	%
Republican	George Radanovich (Incumbent)	179,245	98.43
Democratic	Peter Leinau (write-in)	2,490	1.37
Independent	Phil Rockey (write-in)	366	0.20
Total votes		182,101	100.00
Turnout			51.19
Republican hold			

=== 2010 ===
This election was the final election before the 19th district was redrawn. Jeff Denham won his 2012 re-election as a representative of the 10th district.

2010 United States House of Representatives elections in California
Party	Candidate	Votes	%
Republican	Jeff Denham	128,394	64.6
Democratic	Loraine Goodwin	69,912	35.2
Democratic	Les Marsden (write-in)	596	0.2
Total votes		198,902	100.0
Republican hold			

=== 2012 ===
2012 United States House of Representatives elections in California
Party	Candidate	Votes	%
Democratic	Zoe Lofgren (Incumbent)	162,300	73%
Republican	Robert Murray	59,313	27%
Total votes		221,613	100%
Democratic hold			

=== 2014 ===
2014 United States House of Representatives elections in California
Party	Candidate	Votes	%
Democratic	Zoe Lofgren (Incumbent)	85,888	67%
Republican	Robert Murray	41,900	33%
Total votes		127,788	100%
Democratic hold			

=== 2016 ===
2016 United States House of Representatives elections in California
Party	Candidate	Votes	%
Democratic	Zoe Lofgren (Incumbent)	181,802	74%
Republican	G. Burt Lancaster	64,061	26%
Total votes		245,863	100%
Democratic hold			

=== 2018 ===
2018 United States House of Representatives elections in California
Party	Candidate	Votes	%
Democratic	Zoe Lofgren (Incumbent)	162,496	74%
Republican	Justin James Aguilera	57,823	26%
Total votes		220,319	100%
Democratic hold			

=== 2020 ===
2020 United States House of Representatives elections in California
Party	Candidate	Votes	%
Democratic	Zoe Lofgren (incumbent)	224,385	71.7
Republican	Justin Aguilera	88,642	28.3
Total votes		313,027	100.0
Democratic hold			

=== 2022 ===
2022 United States House of Representatives elections in California
Party	Candidate	Votes	%
Democratic	Jimmy Panetta (incumbent)	194,494	68.7
Republican	Jeff Gorman	88,816	31.3
Total votes		283,310	100.0
Democratic hold			

=== 2024 ===
2024 United States House of Representatives elections in California
Party	Candidate	Votes	%
Democratic	Jimmy Panetta (incumbent)	252,458	69.3
Republican	Jason Anderson	111,862	30.7
Total votes		364,320	100.0
Democratic hold			

== See also ==
- List of United States congressional districts
- California's congressional districts
