= Richard H. Lehman =

American politician

Rick Lehman
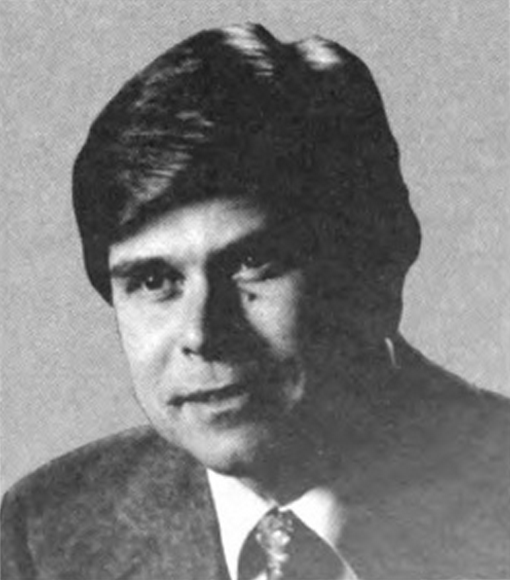

Member of the U.S. House of Representatives from California
- In office January 3, 1983 – January 3, 1995
- Preceded by: Bill Thomas
- Succeeded by: George Radanovich
- Constituency: 18th district (1983–1993); 19th district (1993–1995)

Member of the California State Assembly from the 31st district
- In office December 6, 1976 – November 30, 1982
- Preceded by: Ernest N. Mobley
- Succeeded by: Bruce Bronzan

Personal details
- Born: Richard Henry Lehman; July 20, 1948 (age 78) Fresno, California, U.S.
- Party: Democratic
- Spouse: Virginia Lehman
- Education: Fresno City College; California State University, Fresno; University of California, Santa Cruz (BA)

Richard Henry "Rick" Lehman (born July 20, 1948) is an American lobbyist and former politician who served six-terms as a member of the United States House of Representatives from California from 1983 to 1995. He was previously a member of the California State Assembly.

== Early life and career ==
Lehman was born in Fresno, California. He grew up on his family's farm near Sanger and attended local public schools. He attended Fresno City College before transferring to the University of California, Santa Cruz from which he earned his degree. He was student body president at Fresno City College in 1968. In that year he served as Fresno County Co-Chairman of Robert F. Kennedy's California presidential campaign and he was an alternate delegate to the Democratic National Convention in Chicago.

== Political career ==
In 1969 he joined the staff of California State Senator George Zenovich.

In 1976, Lehman was elected to the State Assembly as a Democrat. He rose quickly through the ranks, becoming assistant majority leader by 1978.

=== Congress ===
In 1983, he successfully ran for a seat in Congress, representing a newly created district in Fresno. He was reelected six times.

Lehman was known in Congress for his passionate commitments to important causes such as environmental protection, water policy, and consumer protection. He was able to strike delicate balances on many of these issues, a particularly important skill given the increasingly conservative nature of his Central Valley district. His notable successes include playing instrumental roles in passage of laws to protect the Kings and Tuolumne Rivers, the California Desert Protection Act, creation of the Mono Basin National Forest Scenic Area and expansions of wilderness areas in the Sequoia and Yosemite National Parks.

He served on the Banking Finance and Urban Affairs Committee where he chaired the Consumer Affairs and Coinage sub-committee, the Energy and Commerce Committee and the Interior and Insular Affairs Committee where he chaired the Mining and Mineral Affairs subcommittee. He served 12 years on the water and Power subcommittee and received the distinguished service award from the National Water REsources Association in 1990. An avid outdoorsman, he frequented the Sierra back country and successfully climbed Mt. Kilimanjaro in Kenya in 1991.

Lehman's district was made considerably more Republican after the 1990s' round of redistricting. It was renumbered the 19th District, and pushed further to the north and east, incorporating some more rural territory in the Sierra Nevada as well as the more conservative eastern portion of Fresno. At the same time, he lost his share of Stockton to the new 11th District, and lost most of his Latino constituents to the neighboring 20th District. Lehman barely held onto his seat in 1992, winning by only 1,100 votes. This led to speculation that the 19th would not stay Democratic for long. In 1994, Lehman was subsequently swept from office in the Republican Revolution, losing to Republican George Radanovich by a 17-point margin—one of the largest margins of defeat for an incumbent in that cycle.

=== After Congress ===
Lehman is currently a partner for the Sacramento-based lobbying firm Lehman Levi Pappas & Sadler. He also serves as a member of the board of the National Parks Trusts, the Mono Lakes Committee, the National council for the Traditional Arts and is on the board of directors of Premier Valley Bank in Fresno.

== Electoral history ==
1982 United States House of Representatives elections in California
Party	Candidate	Votes	%
Democratic	Richard H. Lehman	92,762	59.5
Republican	Adrian C. Fondse	59,664	38.3
Libertarian	Marshall William Fritz	3,501	2.2
Total votes		155,927	100.0
Turnout			
Democratic win (new seat)			

1984 United States House of Representatives elections in California
Party	Candidate	Votes	%
Democratic	Richard H. Lehman (inc.)	128,186	67.3
Republican	Dale L. Ewen	62,339	32.7
Total votes		190,525	100.0
Turnout			
Democratic hold			

1986 United States House of Representatives elections in California
Party	Candidate	Votes	%
Democratic	Richard H. Lehman (inc.)	101,480	71.3
Republican	David C. Crevelt	40,907	28.7
Total votes		142,387	100.0
Turnout			
Democratic hold			

1988 United States House of Representatives elections in California
Party	Candidate	Votes	%
Democratic	Richard H. Lehman (inc.)	125,715	69.9
Republican	David A. Linn	54,034	30.1
Total votes		179,749	100.0
Turnout			
Democratic hold			

1990 United States House of Representatives elections in California
Party	Candidate	Votes	%
Democratic	Richard H. Lehman (inc.)	98,804	100.0
Turnout			
Democratic hold			

1992 United States House of Representatives elections in California
Party	Candidate	Votes	%
Democratic	Richard H. Lehman (Incumbent)	101,619	46.9
Republican	Tal L. Cloud	100,590	46.4
Peace and Freedom	Dorothy L. Wells	13,334	6.2
No party	Williams (write-in)	1,097	0.5
Total votes		216,640	100.0
Turnout			
Democratic hold			

1994 United States House of Representatives elections in California
Party	Candidate	Votes	%
Republican	George Radanovich	104,435	56.78
Democratic	Richard Lehman (Incumbent)	72,912	39.64
Libertarian	Dolores Comstock	6,579	3.58
Total votes		183,926	100.0
Turnout			
Republican gain from Democratic			

U.S. House of Representatives
Preceded by Bill Thomas	Member of the U.S. House of Representatives from California's 18th congressional district 1983–1993	Succeeded by Gary Condit
Preceded by Robert J. Lagomarsino	Member of the U.S. House of Representatives from California's 19th congressional district 1993–1995	Succeeded by George Radanovich
U.S. order of precedence (ceremonial)
Preceded by Tom Barrett as Former U.S. Representative	Order of precedence of the United States as Former U.S. Representative	Succeeded by Mel Levine as Former U.S. Representative
