= Chet Holifield =

American businessman and politician (1903–1995)

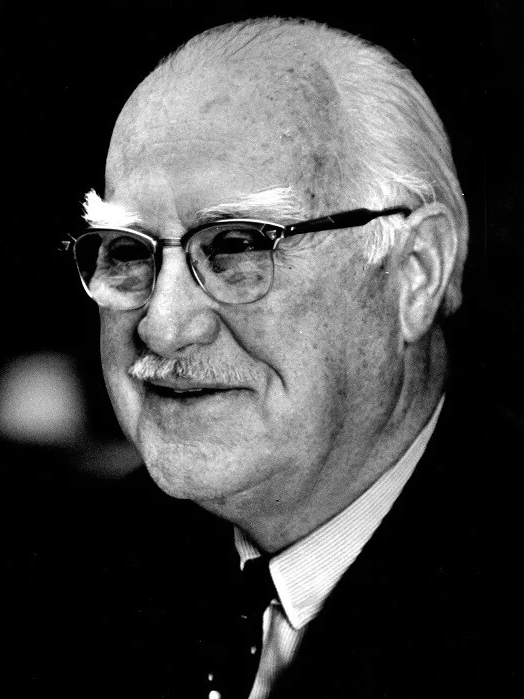

Member of the U.S. House of Representatives from California's 19th district
- In office January 3, 1943 – December 31, 1974
- Preceded by: Harry R. Sheppard
- Succeeded by: Robert J. Lagomarsino

Personal details
- Born: Chester Earl Holifield; December 3, 1903 Mayfield, Kentucky, U.S.
- Died: February 5, 1995 (aged 91) Redlands, California, U.S.
- Resting place: Hillside Memorial Park, Redlands
- Party: Democratic
- Spouse(s): Vernice Caneer (marriage 1922–1991)

Chester Earl Holifield (December 3, 1903 – February 5, 1995) was a 20th-century American businessman and politician, a United States representative from California's 19th congressional district. Holifield became known as "Mr. Atomic Energy" for his legislation promoting the development of nuclear power.

== Early life ==
He was born in Mayfield, Kentucky. He moved with his family to Springdale, Arkansas in 1912. After attending public schools, he moved to Montebello, California in 1920. There he worked in the manufacture and selling of men's apparel from 1920 to 1943.

== Early career ==
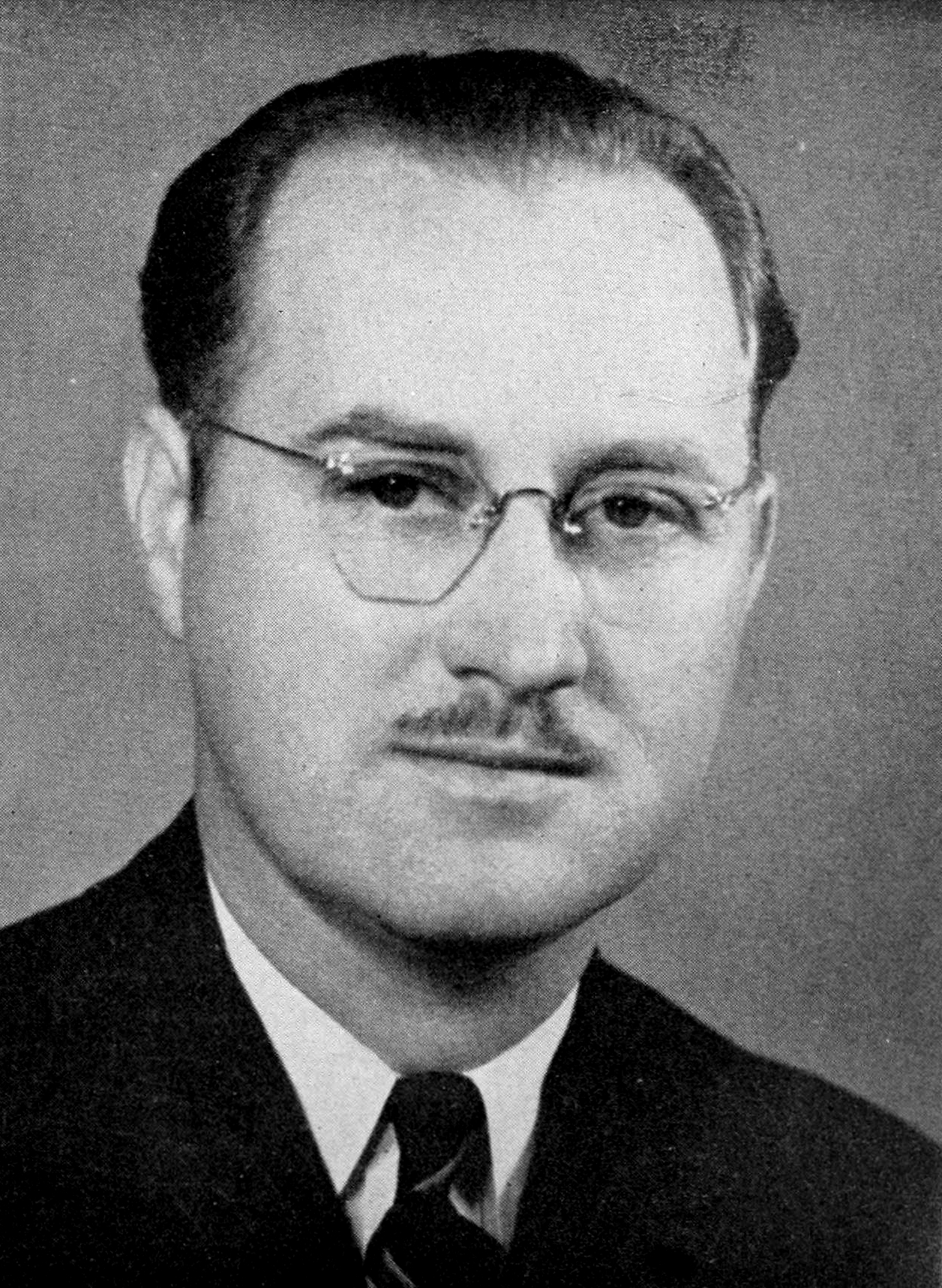
Holifield as former president of the 51st State Assembly district Democratic club, 1940

Becoming active in Democratic Party politics, Holifield was chair of the Los Angeles County Democratic Central committee of the 51st District from 1934 to 1938. He was chair of the California State Central committee of the 12th congressional district from 1938 to 1940. He was also a delegate to each Democratic National Convention from 1940 to 1964.

== Congress ==
In 1942 Holifield was elected as a Democrat representing the 19th congressional district in California. He was one of the few congressmen in California who objected to the internment of Japanese Americans during World War II.

Holifield was subsequently re-elected to the fifteen succeeding Congresses.

While in Congress he was chair of the U.S. House Committee on Government Operations (91st through 93rd Congresses) and the Joint Committee on Atomic Energy (87th, 89th, and 91st Congresses). He was a member of the President's Special Evaluation Commission on Atomic Bomb Tests at Bikini Atoll, 1946.

=== Nuclear policy ===
In the late 1950s and early 1960s, as a member of the House Military Operations Subcommittee, he was a strong advocate of fallout shelters and said that the United States should "build a nationwide system of underground shelters". Holifield was also a congressional adviser to international conferences on uses of atomic energy, nuclear weapons testing, water desalinization, and disarmament.

Alvin M. Weinberg, who advocated inherent safety in reactor design, recounted an incident from 1972, where Holifield said: "if you are concerned about the safety of reactors, then I think it may be time for you to leave nuclear energy."

He served from January 3, 1943, until his resignation on December 31, 1974. He was not a candidate for reelection in 1974 to the 94th Congress.

== Later career ==
After leaving Congress, Holifield resumed the manufacture and selling of men's apparel.

== Personal life ==
In 1922, Holifield married Vernice Caneer, with whom he would have four daughters. Following his retirement from politics, he lived in a beach house in Balboa, California. Vernice died in 1991. Holifield died of pneumonia on February 5, 1995, in Redlands, California.

== Legacy and honors ==
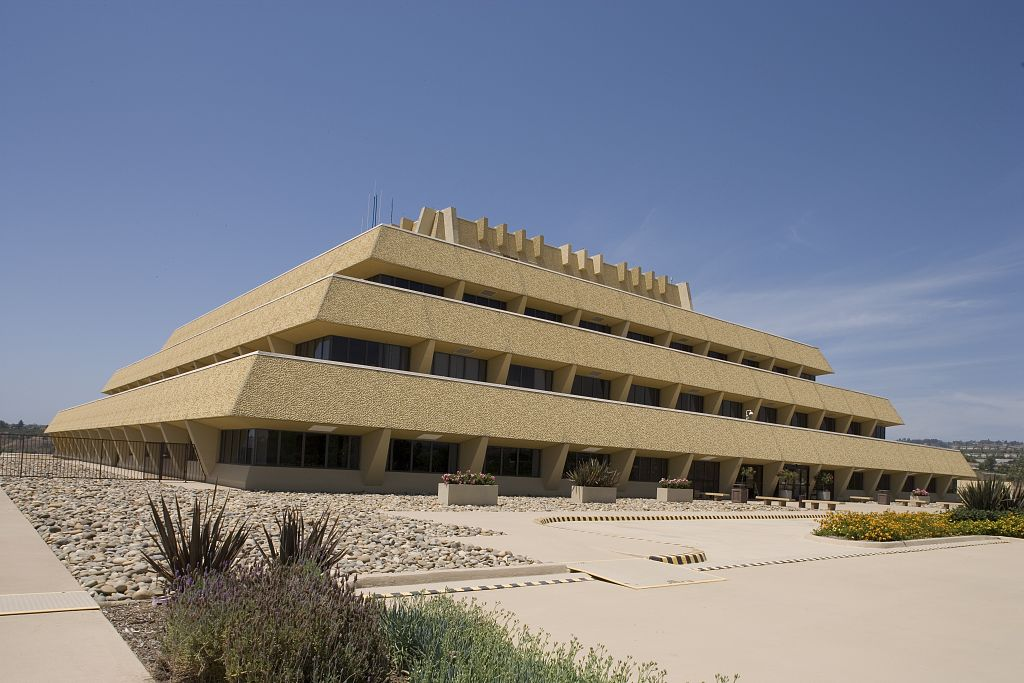
The Chet Holifield Federal Building

- In 1966 he was awarded an Honorary Doctor of Laws (LL.D.) from Whittier College.
- The Chet Holifield Library, named in his honor, opened in 1969 in Montebello, California.
- The Chet Holifield Federal Building in Laguna Niguel, California was renamed in his honor in 1978.

== Electoral history ==
Chester Holifield electoral history

1942 United States House of Representatives elections in California
Party	Candidate	Votes	%
Democratic	Chet Holifield	34,918	63.1
Republican	Carlton H. Casjens	20,446	36.9
Total votes		55,374	100.0
Turnout			
Democratic win (new seat)			

1944 United States House of Representatives elections in California
Party	Candidate	Votes	%
Democratic	Chet Holifield (Incumbent)	65,758	71.8
Republican	Carlton H. Casjens	25,852	28.2
Total votes		91,610	100.0
Turnout			
Democratic hold			

1946 United States House of Representatives elections in California
Party	Candidate	Votes	%
Democratic	Chet Holifield (Incumbent)	50,666	97.6
Independent	Marshall J. Morrill (write-in)	1,248	2.4
Total votes		51,914	100.0
Turnout			
Democratic hold			

1948 United States House of Representatives elections in California
Party	Candidate	Votes	%
Democratic	Chet Holifield (Incumbent)	72,900	69.7
Republican	Joseph Francis Quigley	28,698	27.5
Progressive	Jacob Berman	1,915	1.8
Independent	Myra Tanner Weiss	1,013	1.0
Total votes		104,526	100.0
Turnout			
Democratic hold			

1950 United States House of Representatives elections in California
Party	Candidate	Votes	%
Democratic	Chet Holifield (Incumbent)	73,317	90.9
Independent	Myra Tanner Weiss	7,329	9.1
Total votes		80,646	100.0
Turnout			
Democratic hold			

1952 United States House of Representatives elections in California
Party	Candidate	Votes	%
Democratic	Chet Holifield (Incumbent)	126,606	87.1
Progressive	Ida Alvarez	13,724	9.4
Independent	Milton Snipper	4,959	3.5
Total votes		145,289	100.0
Turnout			
Democratic hold			

1954 United States House of Representatives elections in California
Party	Candidate	Votes	%
Democratic	Chet Holifield (Incumbent)	90,269	74.8
Republican	Raymond R. Pritchard	30,404	25.2
Total votes		120,673	100.0
Turnout			
Democratic hold			

1956 United States House of Representatives elections in California
Party	Candidate	Votes	%
Democratic	Chet Holifield (Incumbent)	116,287	73.8
Republican	Roy E. Reynolds	41,269	26.2
Total votes		157,556	100.0
Turnout			
Democratic hold			

1958 United States House of Representatives elections in California
Party	Candidate	Votes	%
Democratic	Chet Holifield (Incumbent)	131,421	75.3
Republican	Roy E. Reynolds	26,092	24.7
Total votes		157,513	100.0
Turnout			
Democratic hold			

1960 United States House of Representatives elections in California
Party	Candidate	Votes	%
Democratic	Chet Holifield (Incumbent)	145,479	78.2
Republican	Gordon S. McWilliams	40,491	21.8
Total votes		185,970	100.0
Turnout			
Democratic hold			

1962 United States House of Representatives elections in California
Party	Candidate	Votes	%
Democratic	Chet Holifield (Incumbent)	78,436	61.6
Republican	Robert T. Ramsay	48,976	38.4
Total votes		127,412	100.0
Turnout			
Democratic hold			

1964 United States House of Representatives elections in California
Party	Candidate	Votes	%
Democratic	Chet Holifield (Incumbent)	97,934	65.4
Republican	C. Everett Hunt	51,747	34.6
Total votes		149,681	100.0
Turnout			
Democratic hold			

1966 United States House of Representatives elections in California
Party	Candidate	Votes	%
Democratic	Chet Holifield (Incumbent)	82,592	62.3
Republican	William R. Sutton	50,068	37.7
Total votes		132,660	100.0
Turnout			
Democratic hold			

1968 United States House of Representatives elections in California
Party	Candidate	Votes	%
Democratic	Chet Holifield (Incumbent)	96,857	63.2
Republican	Bill Jones	52,284	34.1
American Independent	Wayne L. Cook	3,996	2.6
Total votes		153,137	100.0
Turnout			
Democratic hold			

1970 United States House of Representatives elections in California
Party	Candidate	Votes	%
Democratic	Chet Holifield (Incumbent)	98,578	70.4
Republican	Bill Jones	41,462	29.6
Total votes		140,040	100.0
Turnout			
Democratic hold			

1972 United States House of Representatives elections in California
Party	Candidate	Votes	%
Democratic	Chet Holifield (Incumbent)	103,823	67.2
Republican	Kenneth M. Fisher	43,034	27.9
Peace and Freedom	Joe Harris	7,588	4.9
Total votes		154,445	100.0
Turnout			
Democratic hold			

== Bibliography ==
- Dyke, Richard Wayne. Mr. Atomic Energy: Congressman Chet Holifield and Atomic Energy Affairs from 1945 to 1974. New York: Greenwood Press, 1989; Dyke, Richard Wayne and Francis X. Gannon.
- Chet Holifield: Master Legislator and Nuclear Statesman. With a foreword by Gerald R. Ford and an afterword by Carl Albert. Lanham, [Md.]: University Press of America, 1996.

U.S. House of Representatives
Preceded by Harry R. Sheppard	Member of the U.S. House of Representatives from California's 19th congressional district January 3, 1943 – December 31, 1974	Succeeded by Robert J. Lagomarsino
