= Kittens In Traumatic Testing Ends Now Act =

Proposed American legislation

The Kittens In Traumatic Testing Ends Now Act, stylized as the "KITTEN Act", refers to several proposed pieces of American legislation intended to amend the Animal Welfare Act and prevent harmful or painful procedures during animal research.

The proposal is specifically intended to curtail funding for certain research programs in the United States Department of Agriculture's Agricultural Research Service office. The Washington Post reported allegations that such research into feline toxoplasmosis may have involved cannibalism.

== Legislative history ==
The first proposal, stylized as the KITTEN Act of 2018, was proposed as H.R. 5780, in 2018. Congressman Jimmy Panetta introduced the bill.

This bill was referred to the House Committee on Agriculture's Subcommittee on Livestock and Foreign Agriculture. The landmark 2018 Agriculture bill did not include this legislation, although it did incorporate some text from the unrelated Dog and Cat Meat Trade Prohibition Act of 2018, which was passed by the house before dying in committee in the Senate. This among the last acts of Congress in 2018 prior to a stalemate that resulted in the 2018–19 United States federal government shutdown.

The second proposal, stylized as the KITTEN Act of 2019, was put forward as a bipartisan proposal, led by Congressman Panetta, and co-sponsored by Congressman Brian Mast (R-FL), Congresswoman Elissa Slotkin (D-MI), and Congressman Will Hurd (R-TX).

The bill was introduced as H.R. 1622 and concurrently read as S.708 in the Senate.

== Effect ==
On Tuesday, April 2, 2019 the USDA announced it was ceasing all research experiments involving cats.

== See also ==
- 2018 United States farm bill
- 2018–19 United States federal government shutdown
- No Frills Prison Act
