= Robert Lagomarsino =

American politician (1926–2021)

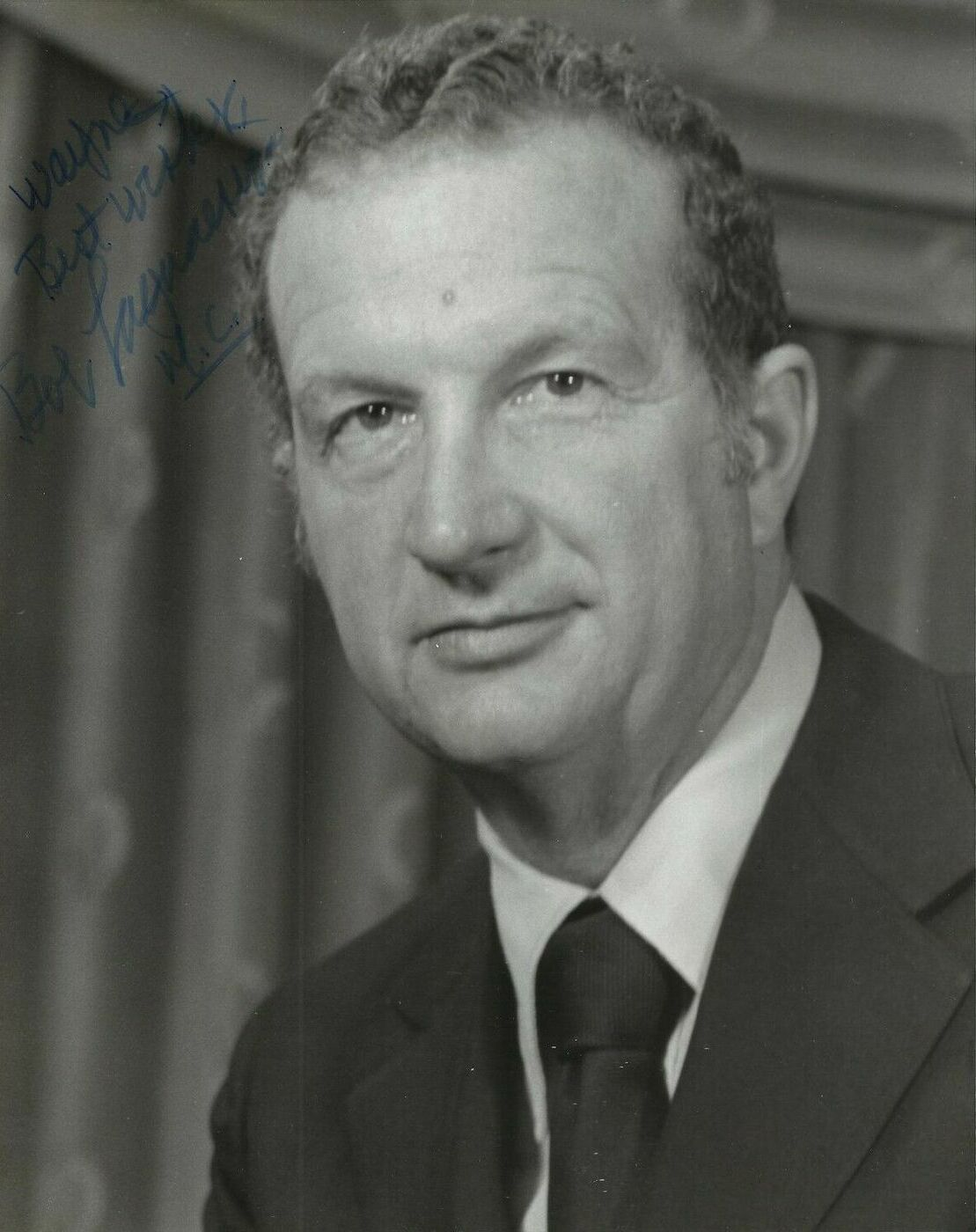

Secretary of the House Republican Conference
- In office January 3, 1985 – January 3, 1989
- Leader: Bob Michel
- Preceded by: Clair Burgener
- Succeeded by: Vin Weber

Member of the U.S. House of Representatives from California
- In office March 13, 1974 – January 3, 1993
- Preceded by: Charles M. Teague
- Succeeded by: Michael Huffington
- Constituency: 13th district (1974–75); 19th district (1975–93)

Member of the California Senate
- In office October 10, 1961 – March 13, 1974
- Preceded by: James J. McBride
- Succeeded by: Omer Rains
- Constituency: 33rd district (1961–1966); 24th district (1966–1974)

Mayor of Ojai, California
- In office December 8, 1958 – October 9, 1961
- Preceded by: Monroe Hirsch
- Succeeded by: Ralph R. Bennett Jr.

Member of the Ojai City Council
- In office 1958–1961

Personal details
- Born: Robert John Lagomarsino; September 4, 1926 Ventura, California, U.S.
- Died: February 7, 2021 (aged 94) Ojai, California, U.S.
- Party: Republican
- Spouse: Norma Jean
- Children: 3
- Education: University of California, Santa Barbara (BA); Santa Clara University (JD)
- Occupation: Attorney

Military service
- Branch/service: United States Navy
- Years of service: 1944–1946
- Battles/wars: World War II

Robert John Lagomarsino (September 4, 1926 – February 7, 2021) was an American politician and lawyer from California who served in the United States House of Representatives. A Republican, he began his service in the United States House of Representatives in 1974 and was re-elected every two years until 1992, when he was defeated for renomination by Michael Huffington. Before serving in the House, Lagomarsino served in the California State Senate from 1961 until 1974, and before that, he served as the mayor of Ojai, California.

== Early life ==
Born and raised in Ventura, California, Lagomarsino was the son of Emilio Lagomarsino and Marjorie (Gates) Lagomarsino. He attended the schools of Ventura and was a 1944 graduate of Ventura High School. He served as a pharmacist mate in the United States Navy from 1944 to 1946 and was a veteran of World War II. He graduated with a Bachelor of Arts degree in 1950 from the University of California, Santa Barbara and in 1953 he received a J.D. from the Santa Clara University School of Law. He was admitted to the bar in 1954 and practiced law in Ventura.

In April 1958, Lagomarsino was elected to the Ojai City Council. In December 1958, his council peers chose him to serve as mayor. He held this office until resigning in late 1961 to enter the California Senate.

== California State Senate ==
In the California Senate, Lagomarsino's most significant legislative achievements included the Garrigus-Lagomarsino Act (1963), which authorized vocational education centers in each county of the State; the California Child Anti-Pornography Act (1969); the Marine Resources Protection Act (1970); the California Wild and Scenic Rivers legislation; the Jury Reform Act (1972); the Consumer Protection Act (1972), which authorized cities to create anti-fraud units; and the Welfare Reform Act (1973). By the time he was elected to the United States Congress, the senior ranking senator from Southern California and a member of the five-person Senate Rules Committee, after having served as Chairman of the Senate Committee on Natural Resources and Wildlife.

== United States Congress ==
In 1974, Congressman Charles Teague, of what was then California's 13th congressional district, where Lagomarsino resided, died suddenly. Lagomarsino was elected to replace Teague as the 13th district congressman in a special election in 1974. He was the only Republican in a 1974 special election to hold a district for his party.

During his service as a United States Congressman, Lagomarsino was an active member of two major House Committees: the Foreign Affairs Committee, as the third-ranking Republican and the Committee on Interior and Insular Affairs, as the second-ranking Republican. He was a Congressional Observer to the Geneva Arms Controls Talks and Vice Chairman of the Subcommittee on Western Hemisphere Affairs, which oversaw U.S. relations with Canada, Central America, and South America. He was also Chairman of the National Republican Institute for International Affairs, Co-Chairman of the Congressional Task Force on Afghanistan, and a member of the Asian and Pacific Affairs Committee. In addition, Lagomarsino served as Chairman of the POW/MIA Task Force and was the House author of a measure creating the Prisoner of War Medal.

Lagomarsino made several trips abroad as a congressman. He toured South America, the Far East, the Pacific Region, the Soviet Union, and Europe numerous times, but held a particular interest in Southeast Asia; meeting with the Laos government in 1989 and, later, the Vietnamese government in 1990, to obtain information on American POW/MIA's in Southeast Asia. He toured the Panama Canal as part of President Carter’s diplomacy and observed Panama's national elections and Kuwait invasion under President Bush. Lagomarsino also attended annual interparliamentary conferences in Mexico and on the European continent.

During his service in Washington, Lagomarsino specialized in environmental concerns, foreign affairs (particularly Latin America), and illegal drug trafficking. He authored legislation that created the Channel Islands National Park, the Dick Smith Wilderness Area, the Los Padres National Forest, and co-authored the Drug War Bond Act and the Violent Crime and Drug Control Act. He was a leader in efforts to open overseas markets to U.S. products and to ban the transfer of strategic goods or technology. Lagomarsino maintained a voting record of 99% and took pride in voting against all proposed congressional pay raises.

== Re-election defeat ==
Before the 1992 congressional elections, a congressional reapportionment plan placed Lagomarsino's residence within the congressional district of fellow Republican Elton Gallegly. Rather than run against Gallegly, Lagomarsino moved to the 22nd District, part of which he already represented, and ran for re-election there. He was challenged in the Republican primary by millionaire Michael Huffington, who defeated Lagomarsino by nearly seven percentage points.

== California State University Channel Islands ==
Lagomarsino was a long-time advocate of establishing a state college in his native Ventura County. His goal came to fruition in 2002, with the establishment of the California State University Channel Islands (CSUCI). A collection of papers, memorabilia, and furniture Lagomarsino had previously donated to the Ventura satellite campus of the California State University, Northridge was transitioned to CSUCI. In 2002, the university's library formally established the Robert J. and Norma M. Lagomarsino Department of Archives and Special Collections.

Lagomarsino continued to be active, serving on numerous community boards in and around Santa Barbara County and Ventura County, and on the Board of the California Center for Public Policy. He and his wife Norma (d. 2015) lived in Ventura, California, and they had three children and six grandchildren. Lagomarsino died on February 7, 2021, at his family ranch in Ojai, California.

The visitor center at Channel Islands National Park is named after Lagomarsino.

== Electoral history ==
Bob Lagomarsino electoral history

1974 California's 13th congressional district special election
Party	Candidate	Votes	%
Republican	Robert J. Lagomarsino		53.7
Democratic	James D. Loebl		18.8
Democratic	James A. Browning Jr.		7.8
Democratic	Roger A. Ikola		6.3
Democratic	E.T. "Tom" Jolicoeur		6.0
Democratic	David H. Miller		3.2
Democratic	R.W. Handley		2.4
Democratic	F. Joe Deauchamp		1.9
Total votes			100.0
Turnout			
Republican hold			

1974 United States House of Representatives elections in California
Party	Candidate	Votes	%
Republican	Robert J. Lagomarsino (Incumbent)	84,849	56.3
Democratic	James D. Loebl	65,334	43.7
Total votes		150,183	100.0
Turnout			
Republican hold			

1976 United States House of Representatives elections in California
Party	Candidate	Votes	%
Republican	Robert J. Lagomarsino (Incumbent)	124,201	64.4
Democratic	Dan Sisson	68,722	35.6
Total votes		192,923	100.0
Turnout			
Republican hold			

1978 United States House of Representatives elections in California
Party	Candidate	Votes	%
Republican	Robert J. Lagomarsino (Incumbent)	123,192	71.7
Democratic	Jerry Zamos	41,672	24.3
Peace and Freedom	Milton Shiro Takei	6,887	4.0
Total votes		171,751	100.0
Turnout			
Republican hold			

1980 United States House of Representatives elections in California
Party	Candidate	Votes	%
Republican	Robert J. Lagomarsino (Incumbent)	162,849	77.7
Democratic	Carmen Lodise	36,990	17.6
Libertarian	Jim Trotter	9,764	4.7
Total votes		209,603	100.0
Turnout			
Republican hold			

1982 United States House of Representatives elections in California
Party	Candidate	Votes	%
Republican	Robert J. Lagomarsino (Incumbent)	112,486	61.1
Democratic	Frank Frost	66,042	35.8
Libertarian	R. C. Gordon-McCutchan	4,198	2.3
Peace and Freedom	Charles J. Zekan	1,520	0.8
Total votes		184,246	100.0
Turnout			
Republican hold			

1984 United States House of Representatives elections in California
Party	Candidate	Votes	%
Republican	Robert J. Lagomarsino (Incumbent)	153,187	67.3
Democratic	James C. Carey Jr.	70,278	30.9
Peace and Freedom	Charles J. Zekan	4,161	1.8
Total votes		227,626	100.0
Turnout			
Republican hold			

1986 United States House of Representatives elections in California
Party	Candidate	Votes	%
Republican	Robert J. Lagomarsino (Incumbent)	122,578	71.9
Democratic	Wayne B. Norris	45,619	26.8
Libertarian	George Hasara	2,341	1.4
Total votes		170,538	100.0
Turnout			
Republican hold			

1988 United States House of Representatives elections in California
Party	Candidate	Votes	%
Republican	Robert J. Lagomarsino (Incumbent)	116,026	50.2
Democratic	Gary K. Hart	112,033	48.5
Libertarian	Robert Donaldson	2,865	1.2
Total votes		230,924	100.0
Turnout			
Republican hold			

1990 United States House of Representatives elections in California
Party	Candidate	Votes	%
Republican	Robert J. Lagomarsino (Incumbent)	94,599	54.6
Democratic	Anita Perez Ferguson	76,991	44.4
No party	Lorenz (write-in)	1,655	1.0
Total votes		173,235	100.0
Turnout			
Republican hold			

U.S. House of Representatives
Preceded by Charles M. Teague (d. January 1, 1974)	Member of the U.S. House of Representatives from California's 13th congressional district March 5, 1974 – January 3, 1975	Succeeded by Norman Mineta
Preceded by Chester E. Holifield	Member of the U.S. House of Representatives from California's 19th congressional district 1975–1993	Succeeded by Richard H. Lehman
Party political offices
Preceded by Clair Burgener; California	Secretary of House Republican Conference; 1985–1989	Succeeded by Vin Weber; Minnesota
