= 1998 California lieutenant gubernatorial election =

- November 3, 1998
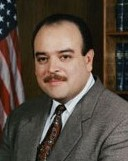

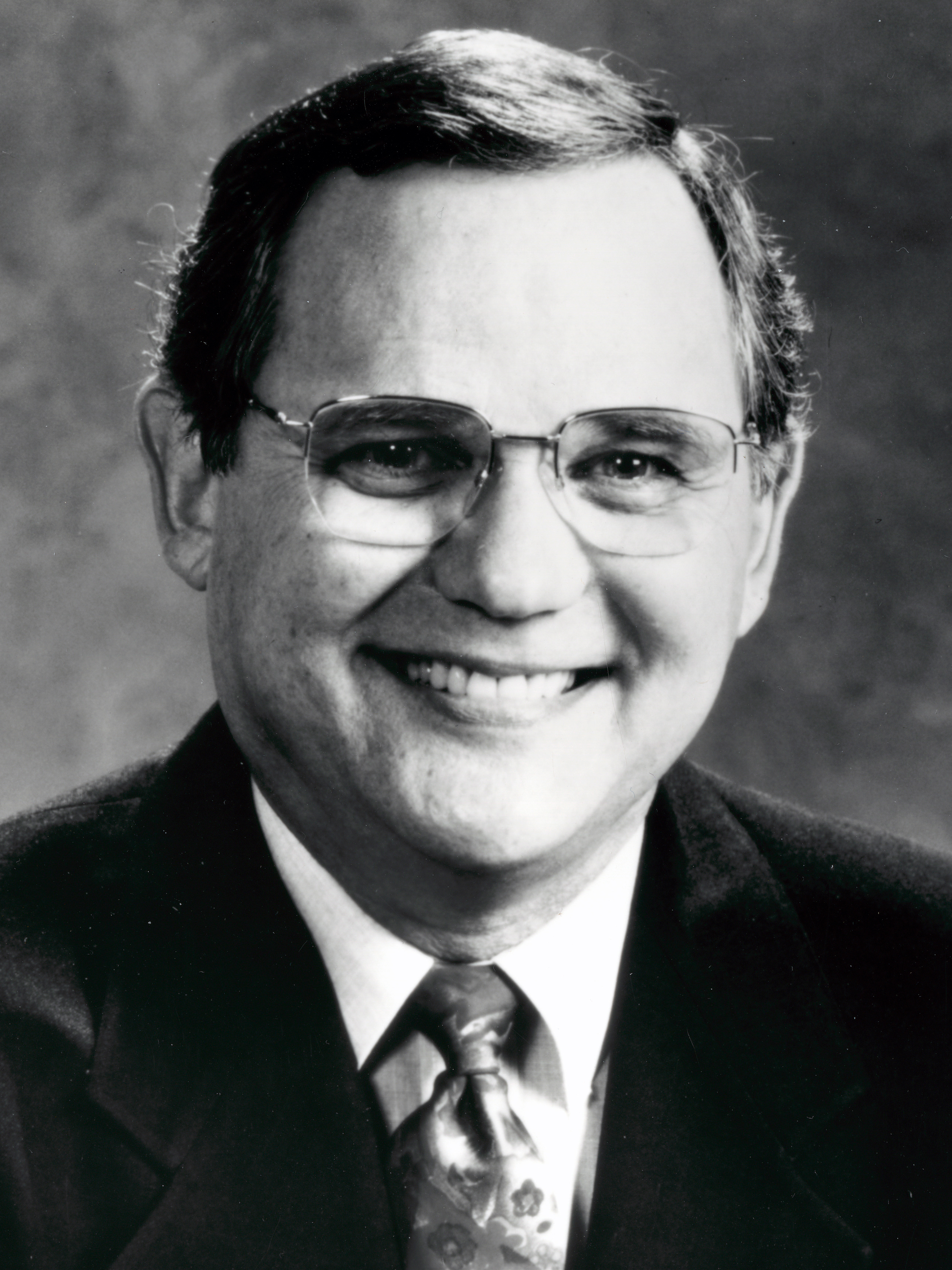
Nominee	Cruz Bustamante	Tim Leslie
Party	Democratic	Republican
Popular vote	4,290,473	3,161,031
Percentage	52.69%	38.82%
- County results Bustamante: 40–50% 50–60% 60–70% Leslie: 40–50% 50–60% 60–70%
Lt. Governor before election
Gray Davis
Democratic
Elected Lt. Governor
Cruz Bustamante
Democratic

The 1998 California lieutenant gubernatorial election occurred on November 3, 1998. The primary elections took place on June 2, 1998. State Assemblyman and Speaker of the Assembly Cruz Bustamante, the Democratic nominee, decisively defeated the Republican nominee, State Senator Tim Leslie, to succeed the incumbent Gray Davis, who chose not to seek re-election in favor of running for governor.

== Primary results ==
Final results from the Secretary of State of California

=== Democratic ===
==== Candidates ====
- Cruz Bustamante, Speaker of the California State Assembly
- Tony Miller, Former Acting Secretary of State
- Larry K. Reed

California Lt. Governor Democratic primary, 1998
Candidate	Votes	%
Cruz Bustamante	1,899,566	73.14
Tony Miller	473,848	18.25
Larry K. Reed	223,631	8.61
Total votes	2,597,045	100.00

=== Republican ===
==== Candidates ====
- Tim Leslie, State Senator
- Noel Hentschel, Businessman
- Dick Mountjoy, State Senator
- Ingrid Lundberg

California Lt. Governor Republican primary, 1998
Candidate	Votes	%
Tim Leslie	898,831	35.81
Noel Hentschel	725,661	28.91
Dick Mountjoy	651,780	25.97
Ingrid Lundberg	233,403	9.31
Total votes	2,509,675	100.00

=== Peace and Freedom ===
California Lt. Governor Peace & Freedom primary, 1998
Candidate	Votes	%
Jaime Luis Gomez	75,760	53.68
Regina Lark	65,368	46.32
Total votes	141,128	100.00

=== Others ===
California Lt. Governor primary, 1998 (Others)
Party	Candidate	Votes	%
Green	Sara Amir	151,408	100.00
Libertarian	Thomas M. Tryon	107,226	100.00
Reform	James J. Mangia	42,383	100.00
American Independent	George M. McCoy	40,376	100.00

== General election results ==
Final results from the Secretary of State of California

1998 lieutenant governor election, California
Party	Candidate	Votes	%
Democratic	Cruz Bustamante	4,290,473	52.69%
Republican	Tim Leslie	3,161,031	38.82%
Green	Sara Amir	247,897	3.04%
Libertarian	Thomas Tryon	167,523	2.06%
Peace and Freedom	Jaime Luis Gomez	109,888	1.35%
American Independent	George McCoy	92,349	1.13%
Reform	James Mangia	74,180	0.91%
Invalid or blank votes		477,780	5.54%
Total votes		8,143,341	100.00%
Turnout			41.32%
Democratic hold			

=== Results by county ===
Final results from the Secretary of State of California.

County	Bustamante	Votes	Leslie	Votes	Amir	Votes	Tryon	Votes	Others	Votes
San Francisco	67.91%	152,668	15.18%	34,122	11.39%	25,599	1.54%	3,468	3.97%	8,945
Alameda	64.60%	236,652	23.80%	87,178	5.82%	21,336	1.79%	6,549	3.99%	14,617
Los Angeles	62.06%	1,186,799	30.65%	586,184	2.53%	48,328	1.66%	31,720	3.11%	59,406
San Mateo	61.67%	122,648	29.41%	58,496	3.59%	7,132	2.05%	4,086	3.27%	6,504
Marin	60.81%	59,606	29.13%	28,555	5.38%	5,272	2.08%	2,037	2.61%	2,553
Solano	57.28%	56,671	34.05%	33,690	2.42%	2,390	2.05%	2,029	4.20%	4,149
Sonoma	56.74%	88,519	30.61%	47,758	5.90%	9,200	2.81%	4,378	3.94%	6,161
Merced	56.29%	22,028	38.44%	15,043	1.07%	417	1.47%	577	2.73%	1,070
Yolo	56.25%	28,238	34.00%	17,069	5.13%	2,574	1.79%	901	2.83%	1,419
Santa Cruz	56.16%	46,691	28.18%	23,429	8.59%	7,144	3.12%	2,591	3.95%	3,279
Fresno	55.88%	95,010	39.78%	67,641	0.91%	1,546	1.41%	2,403	2.02%	3,428
Santa Clara	55.70%	225,382	34.69%	140,380	3.37%	13,617	2.57%	10,396	3.67%	14,877
Contra Costa	55.69%	163,323	36.22%	106,235	2.98%	8,746	1.91%	5,590	3.20%	9,402
Monterey	54.16%	48,509	36.67%	32,846	2.85%	2,556	2.37%	2,121	3.94%	3,532
Imperial	53.20%	12,468	36.92%	8,651	1.22%	287	1.98%	465	6.67%	1,563
Lake	52.89%	9,744	36.64%	6,749	3.34%	615	2.93%	540	4.19%	774
Kings	52.38%	11,785	41.56%	9,351	0.77%	174	1.76%	396	3.51%	792
San Benito	51.93%	6,657	38.51%	4,937	2.29%	293	3.01%	386	4.26%	547
Napa	51.67%	21,611	38.07%	15,923	3.33%	1,391	2.54%	1,063	4.40%	1,836
Sacramento	50.80%	180,599	42.63%	151,559	2.45%	8,713	1.53%	5,442	2.59%	9,208
Stanislaus	50.60%	50,022	43.64%	43,142	1.17%	1,159	2.12%	2,096	2.46%	2,438
San Joaquin	50.34%	61,845	43.34%	53,243	1.21%	1,490	2.28%	2,802	2.82%	3,468
Tulare	50.06%	36,277	45.20%	32,753	0.85%	616	1.81%	1,311	2.08%	1,506
San Bernardino	49.03%	159,206	43.14%	140,072	1.72%	5,572	1.92%	6,242	4.19%	13,609
Mendocino	48.52%	13,448	32.43%	8,990	10.05%	2,785	3.84%	1,064	5.16%	1,431
Santa Barbara	47.48%	57,042	43.07%	51,740	3.99%	4,797	2.06%	2,470	3.40%	4,090
Riverside	46.72%	156,016	45.57%	152,171	1.72%	5,730	2.04%	6,824	3.94%	13,171
Ventura	46.71%	94,869	44.89%	91,157	2.24%	4,543	2.42%	4,909	3.75%	7,604
Humboldt	46.46%	20,951	34.03%	15,343	11.15%	5,027	4.20%	1,894	4.15%	1,875
Madera	46.06%	12,065	48.93%	12,815	1.08%	282	1.93%	506	2.00%	524
Del Norte	45.49%	3,313	42.02%	3,060	2.99%	218	4.38%	319	5.12%	373
Tuolumne	44.78%	8,841	47.53%	9,383	2.02%	398	3.23%	638	2.43%	481
San Luis Obispo	44.70%	37,834	46.74%	39,557	3.57%	3,023	2.32%	1,963	2.67%	2,264
San Diego	43.70%	309,307	47.34%	335,069	2.68%	18,999	2.35%	16,666	3.92%	27,765
Mariposa	41.35%	2,914	49.66%	3,500	2.61%	184	3.42%	241	2.97%	209
Amador	40.51%	5,334	53.88%	7,094	1.52%	200	2.15%	283	1.95%	256
Kern	40.29%	56,147	52.72%	73,457	1.13%	1,569	2.09%	2,914	3.77%	5,255
Orange	39.37%	273,095	52.97%	367,473	2.08%	14,420	2.20%	15,235	3.38%	23,479
Yuba	38.82%	5,213	53.78%	7,222	1.59%	214	2.43%	326	3.37%	454
Tehama	38.22%	6,963	51.80%	9,436	1.36%	247	3.72%	677	4.91%	894
Trinity	38.05%	1,860	46.83%	2,289	4.15%	203	5.22%	255	5.75%	281
Siskiyou	38.02%	6,181	51.70%	8,406	2.21%	360	4.32%	702	3.75%	609
Alpine	37.19%	209	48.75%	274	5.16%	29	3.91%	22	4.98%	28
Nevada	36.69%	14,088	55.15%	21,177	3.82%	1,466	2.06%	790	2.28%	878
Butte	36.32%	23,488	55.40%	35,827	2.87%	1,859	2.30%	1,489	3.11%	2,008
Colusa	36.30%	1,745	56.50%	2,716	1.02%	49	2.83%	136	3.35%	161
El Dorado	36.10%	20,680	57.64%	33,022	2.31%	1,321	1.80%	1,033	2.16%	1,235
Calaveras	35.93%	5,767	48.96%	7,858	1.51%	242	11.64%	1,869	1.96%	314
Shasta	35.88%	18,684	54.66%	28,461	1.84%	960	3.37%	1,756	4.25%	2,212
Inyo	35.85%	2,385	54.51%	3,626	2.59%	172	2.86%	190	4.19%	279
Placer	35.37%	31,064	59.43%	52,191	1.83%	1,608	1.51%	1,330	1.85%	1,622
Mono	35.15%	1,202	55.76%	1,907	3.22%	110	3.57%	122	2.31%	79
Sutter	34.62%	7,529	59.60%	12,959	1.11%	241	1.95%	423	2.72%	593
Plumas	33.58%	2,862	59.70%	5,089	2.05%	175	2.44%	208	2.23%	190
Glenn	32.82%	2,435	59.68%	4,428	1.17%	87	2.75%	204	3.57%	265
Lassen	30.44%	2,511	61.94%	5,110	1.50%	124	2.84%	234	3.28%	271
Sierra	30.06%	527	59.33%	1,040	2.11%	37	4.51%	79	3.99%	70
Modoc	27.27%	946	62.78%	2,178	1.47%	51	4.70%	163	3.78%	131

== See also ==
- 1998 California elections
- State of California
- Lieutenant Governor of California
- List of lieutenant governors of California
