= Tranquillity, California =

Tranquillity
- Unincorporated Community; Census Designated Place
- Location in Fresno County and the state of California

- Location in the United States
- Coordinates: 36°38′56″N 120°15′10″W
- Country: United States
- State: California
- County: Fresno
- Named for: Tranquillity

Government
  - State Senator: Anna Caballero (D)
  - State Assembly: Esmeralda Soria (D)
  - U. S. Congress: Adam Gray (D)

Area
  - Total: 0.617 sq mi (1.599 km^{2})
  - Land: 0.617 sq mi (1.599 km^{2})
  - Water: 0 sq mi (0 km^{2})
- Elevation: 160 ft (50 m)

Population (2020)
  - Total: 805
  - Density: 1,300/sq mi (503/km^{2})
- Time zone: UTC-8 (Pacific (PST))
  - Summer (DST): UTC-7 (PDT)
- ZIP code: 93668
- Area code: 559
- FIPS code: 06-80266
- GNIS feature IDs: 1660022, 2409347

Tranquillity is a census-designated place (CDP) in Fresno County, California, United States. It is located 10 miles (16 km) southeast of Mendota, at an elevation of 164 feet (50 m). The population was 805 at the 2020 census, up from 799 at the 2010 census. Tranquillity High School is the only high school in Tranquillity.

== Geography ==
According to the United States Census Bureau, the CDP has a total area of 0.6 square miles (1.6 km^{2}), all land.

== History ==
The first post office opened in Tranquillity in 1910.

The town received recognition during a September 29, 1970 episode of the long-running television show Hee Haw. It was part of the show's weekly "salute" feature, and co-host Buck Owens acknowledged the town's population, which at the time was 750.

The episode had Ray Charles and Lynn Anderson as musical guests.

== Demographics ==
Historical population
Census	Pop.	Note	%±
2000	813		—
2010	799		−1.7%
2020	805		0.8%
U.S. Decennial Census; 1860–1870 1880-1890; 1900 1910 1920; 1930 1940 1950; 1960 1970 1980; 1990 2000 2010

Tranquillity first appeared as a census designated place in the 2000 U.S. census.

=== 2020 ===
The 2020 United States census reported that Tranquillity had a population of 805. The population density was 1,304.7 inhabitants per square mile (503.7/km^{2}). The racial makeup of Tranquillity was 183 (22.7%) White, 2 (0.2%) African American, 5 (0.6%) Native American, 1 (0.1%) Asian, 0 (0.0%) Pacific Islander, 401 (49.8%) from other races, and 213 (26.5%) from two or more races. Hispanic or Latino of any race were 694 persons (86.2%).

The whole population lived in households. There were 231 households, out of which 95 (41.1%) had children under the age of 18 living in them, 128 (55.4%) were married-couple households, 9 (3.9%) were cohabiting couple households, 51 (22.1%) had a female householder with no partner present, and 43 (18.6%) had a male householder with no partner present. 34 households (14.7%) were one person, and 14 (6.1%) were one person aged 65 or older. The average household size was 3.48. There were 181 families (78.4% of all households).

The age distribution was 253 people (31.4%) under the age of 18, 83 people (10.3%) aged 18 to 24, 199 people (24.7%) aged 25 to 44, 158 people (19.6%) aged 45 to 64, and 112 people (13.9%) who were 65 years of age or older. The median age was 30.5 years. For every 100 females, there were 102.3 males.

There were 248 housing units at an average density of 401.9 units per square mile (155.2 units/km^{2}), of which 231 (93.1%) were occupied. Of these, 126 (54.5%) were owner-occupied, and 105 (45.5%) were occupied by renters.

=== 2010 ===
The 2010 United States census reported that Tranquillity had a population of 799. The population density was 1,294.1 inhabitants per square mile (499.7/km^{2}). The racial makeup of Tranquillity was 504 (63.1%) White, 9 (1.1%) African American, 13 (1.6%) Native American, 2 (0.3%) Asian, 0 (0.0%) Pacific Islander, 251 (31.4%) from other races, and 20 (2.5%) from two or more races. Hispanic or Latino of any race were 637 persons (79.7%).

The Census reported that 799 people (100% of the population) lived in households, 0 (0%) lived in non-institutionalized group quarters, and 0 (0%) were institutionalized.

There were 229 households, out of which 120 (52.4%) had children under the age of 18 living in them, 141 (61.6%) were opposite-sex married couples living together, 21 (9.2%) had a female householder with no husband present, 20 (8.7%) had a male householder with no wife present. There were 15 (6.6%) unmarried opposite-sex partnerships, and 0 (0%) same-sex married couples or partnerships. 38 households (16.6%) were made up of individuals, and 13 (5.7%) had someone living alone who was 65 years of age or older. The average household size was 3.49. There were 182 families (79.5% of all households); the average family size was 3.98.

The population age distribution is 267 people (33.4%) under the age of 18, 55 people (6.9%) aged 18 to 24, 206 people (25.8%) aged 25 to 44, 177 people (22.2%) aged 45 to 64, and 94 people (11.8%) who were 65 years of age or older. The median age was 32.7 years. For every 100 females, there were 106.5 males. For every 100 females age 18 and over, there were 103.1 males.

There were 255 housing units at an average density of 413.0 per square mile (159.5/km^{2}), of which 229 were occupied, of which 145 (63.3%) were owner-occupied, and 84 (36.7%) were occupied by renters. The homeowner vacancy rate was 2.0%; the rental vacancy rate was 13.3%. 478 people (59.8% of the population) lived in owner-occupied housing units and 321 people (40.2%) lived in rental housing units.

=== 2000 ===
As of the census of 2000, the median income for a household in the CDP was $42,857, and the median income for a family was $60,208. Males had a median income of $29,250 versus $17,222 for females. The per capita income for the CDP was $13,128. About 12.2% of families and 7.9% of the population were below the poverty line, including 5.2% of those under age 18 and 17.7% of those age 65 or over.

== Education ==
Tranquillity is served by the Golden Plains Unified School District.
