= Bruce Bronzan =

American politician (1947–2020)

Member of the California State Assembly from the 31st district
- In office December 6, 1982 - November 30, 1992
- Preceded by: Richard H. Lehman
- Succeeded by: Cruz Bustamante

Personal details
- Born: September 28, 1947 Fresno, California, U.S.
- Died: September 28, 2020 (aged 73) Greenbrae, California, U.S.
- Party: Democratic
- Spouse(s): Linda Barnes; Jeri Brittell
- Children: 2
- Education: Fresno State

Bruce Clinton Bronzan (September 28, 1947 – September 28, 2020) was an American politician who served as a member of the California State Assembly from 1982 until his resignation in 1992.

Bronzan was born in Fresno, California. He received his undergraduate degree from California State University, Fresno, was a fellow with the Coro Foundation in San Francisco, and received a master's degree in urban studies from Occidental College in Los Angeles.

Prior to serving in the Assembly, Bronzan was a high school teacher, then became a program director in mental health in Fresno County before successfully running for the Fresno County Board of Supervisors. He served on the board from 1975 until his election to the Assembly in 1982.

In the Assembly, he chaired the Health Committee, the Select Committee on Mental Health, and the Appropriations Subcommittee on Health. He became a nationally recognized leader in mental health, successfully carrying the Mental Health Reform Act and the first mental health parity bill in the nation. He was also extensively involved in policy work for kids-at-risk, aging and long-term-care, and public health with more than a hundred pieces of major legislation passed under his name.

Less than a month after being re-elected to a sixth term in the Assembly in 1992, Bronzan resigned his seat to become the associate dean for administration and development at the University of California, San Francisco's Fresno campus (known as "UCSF Fresno"). He continued his commitment and dedication to health care education and policy during his employment from 1993-1997. Bronzan was also a senior scholar with the UCSF Phil Lee Institute of Health Policy Studies, and was president of Trilogy, a healthcare internet company specializing in developing community-based web portals in health and human services for counties and states.

Bronzan died of lymphoma on September 28, 2020, his 73rd birthday, in Greenbrae, California. He was survived by his second wife, Jeri Brittell Bronzan, and his two children with his first wife, the former Linda Barnes. Daughter Chloë Bronzan is a professional actress and director in the San Francisco Bay Area. Son Forest Bronzan is an investor and entrepreneur and the former CEO of Email Aptitude; he lives in Ross, California.

Political offices
| Preceded by Richard H. Lehman | California State Assemblyman, 31st District; December 6, 1982 - November 30, 1992 | Succeeded by Cruz Bustamante |
