= Tranquillity High School =

High school in California, United States

Coordinates: 36°38′44.6″N 120°15′15.7″W

Tranquillity High School (THS) is a public high school in Tranquility, California that was founded in 1917. It was formerly known as Tranquillity Union High School (TUHS) until THS and other satellite schools in the area combined and formed the Golden Plains Unified School District in the early 1990s. Prior to the formation of the new district, students from the town of Mendota also attended there. The school serves the communities of Tranquillity, San Joaquin, Helm and Cantua Creek and is fully accredited through 2022. As of 2024 it serves 400 students.

== Notable alumni ==
- Cruz Bustamante (1971), Lieutenant Governor of California from 1999 to 2007, serving under Governors Gray Davis and Arnold Schwarzenegger.
