= Jimmy Panetta =

American politician (born 1969)

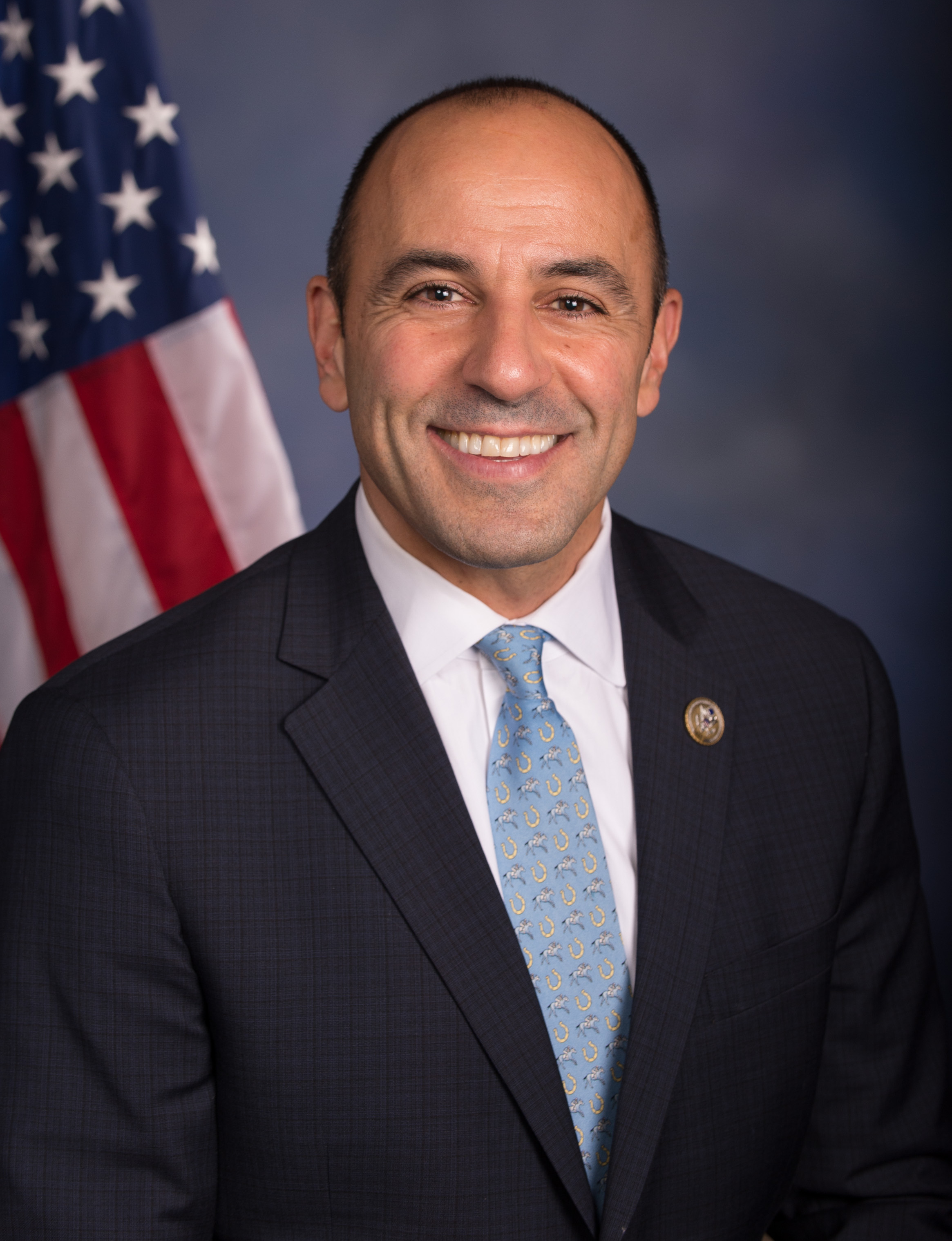
- Official portrait, 2017

Member of the U.S. House of Representatives from California
- Incumbent
- Assumed office January 3, 2017
- Preceded by: Sam Farr
- Constituency: 20th district (2017–2023); 19th district (2023–present)

Personal details
- Born: James Varni Panetta; October 1, 1969 (age 57) Washington, D.C., U.S.
- Party: Democratic
- Spouse: Carrie McIntyre
- Children: 2
- Parent: Leon Panetta (father)
- Education: Monterey Peninsula College (attended); University of California, Davis (BA); Santa Clara University (JD)
- Website: House website Campaign website

Military service
- Branch/service: United States Navy
- Years of service: 2003–2011
- Unit: Navy Reserve
- Battles/wars: War in Afghanistan
- Awards: Bronze Star Medal
- Panetta's voice Panetta on the Day of Silence. Recorded April 21, 2021

James Varni Panetta (/pəˈnɛtə/ pə-NEH-tə; born October 1, 1969) is an American lawyer, politician, and former Navy intelligence officer from the state of California.

A member of the Democratic Party, he is the U.S. representative for California's 19th congressional district. The district includes part of San Jose, as well as all of Santa Cruz, Monterey, Carmel-by-the-Sea, and Paso Robles.

Panetta was first elected in 2016, after working as a deputy district attorney for Monterey County.

He is the son of former Secretary of Defense Leon Panetta, and represents the same geographic region his father once represented in Congress.

== Early life and career ==
Panetta graduated from Carmel High School in Carmel, California. He then attended Monterey Peninsula College and the University of California, Davis, graduating with a bachelor's degree in international relations. He then interned at the United States Department of State. Panetta received his J.D. degree from the Santa Clara University School of Law.

=== Military service ===
He joined the United States Navy Reserve as an intelligence officer and completed a tour of duty in the War in Afghanistan in 2007 while attached to Joint Special Operations Command, for which he was awarded the Bronze Star.

=== Legal career ===
He worked in the Alameda County, California, prosecutor's office and as a deputy district attorney for the District Attorney's office of Monterey County, California.

== Elections ==
=== 2016 ===
After incumbent U.S. Representative Sam Farr announced in November 2015 that he would not seek reelection, Panetta announced his candidacy to succeed Farr in the 2016 election. His father had represented the district from 1977 to 1993.

Panetta defeated Republican Casey Lucius in the November general election. Democrats, in the persons of the Panettas and Farr, have held the seat and its predecessors without interruption since 1977. It is one of California's most Democratic districts outside Los Angeles and the Bay Area; Republicans have only garnered as much as 40% of the vote twice since 1977.

=== 2018 ===
Panetta was reelected, defeating an independent challenger with 81.4% of the vote.

=== 2020 ===
Panetta was reelected to a third term, defeating Republican challenger Jeff Gorman, a financial adviser, with 76.8% of the vote.

=== 2022 ===
Due to redistricting, the incumbent changed from Democrat Zoe Lofgren to fellow Democrat Jimmy Panetta. Panetta, who had represented the 20th district since 2017, was re-elected in 2022 in the newly-drawn 19th district. He again defeated Gorman, who sought a rematch after the 2020 campaign, by a margin of 67.3% to 23.3%. The remaining vote was spread out among other candidates.

=== 2024 ===
In 2024, Panetta defeated the Republican candidate, auto shop manager Jason Anderson, by a margin of 65% to 28.6%.

== Congress ==
Panetta was sworn into office on January 3, 2017. House Democrats selected him to be a regional whip for Northern California, the Central Coast, Hawaii and the U.S. Pacific Islands.

Twice, in 2018 and in 2019, Panetta introduced a bill commonly stylized as the KITTEN Act, a legislative proposal to curtail certain types of animal testing.

In February 2023, during the Russo-Ukrainian War, Panetta signed a letter advocating for President Biden to give F-16 fighter jets to Ukraine.

During May 2024, Panetta joined a bipartisan House delegation that traveled to Taiwan to signal support for the newly elected pro-Taiwanese independence government in the aftermath of Chinese military exercises that simulated a blockade of Taiwan.

=== Committee assignments ===
For the 119th Congress:

- Committee on the Budget
- Committee on Ways and Means
  - Subcommittee on Trade

=== Caucus memberships ===
- Congressional Arts Caucus
- Climate Solutions Caucus
- Rare Disease Caucus
- Congressional Equality Caucus
- Work for Warriors Caucus
- Congressional Progressive Caucus
- For Country Caucus, Founder and Former Co-Chair
- New Democrat Coalition
- Medicare for All Caucus
- Problem Solvers Caucus

== Electoral history ==
Electoral history of Jimmy Panetta
Year	Office		Party	Primary			General			Result	Swing	Ref.
Year	Office		Party	Total	%	P.	Total	%	P.	Result	Swing	Ref.
2016	U.S. House	20th	Democratic	116,826	70.83	1st	180,980	70.75	1st	Won	Hold	
2018	U.S. House	20th	Democratic	102,828	80.67	1st	183,677	81.37	1st	Won	Hold	
2020	U.S. House	20th	Democratic	123,615	66.18	1st	236,896	76.78	1st	Won	Hold	
2022	U.S. House	19th	Democratic	127,545	67.30	1st	194,494	68.65	1st	Won	Hold	
2024	U.S. House	19th	Democratic	132,711	65.03	1st	252,458	69.30	1st	Won	Hold	
2026	U.S. House	19th	Democratic	127,294	58.43	1st	TBD					
Source: Secretary of State of California | Statewide Election Results

== Political positions ==
=== Abortion ===
As of 2020, Panetta has a 100% rating from NARAL Pro-Choice America and a F grade from the Susan B. Anthony List for his abortion-related voting history. He opposed the 2022 overturning of Roe v. Wade.

=== Big Tech ===
In 2022, Panetta was one of 16 Democrats to vote against the Merger Filing Fee Modernization Act of 2022, an antitrust package that would crack down on corporations for anti-competitive behavior.

=== Tax reform ===
In 2026, he joined two other House members in introducing legislation to require the IRS to act on tax refund claims within one year and to provide explanations for any denials. The bill would also add inflation adjustments and interest for refunds paid after that deadline.

== Personal life ==
Panetta is the youngest of the three sons of Leon Panetta, the former United States Secretary of Defense. His wife, Carrie, is a judge on the Monterey County Superior Court. They have two daughters.

=== Foreign awards ===
- Ukraine
  - Honorary Diploma of the Verkhovna Rada of Ukraine (2024) – Awarded by Ukrainian Parliament; presented by Ruslan Stefanchuk, Chairman of the Verkhovna Rada.

U.S. House of Representatives
Preceded by Sam Farr	Member of the U.S. House of Representatives from California's 20th congressional district 2017–2023	Succeeded by Kevin McCarthy
Preceded by Zoe Lofgren	Member of the U.S. House of Representatives from California's 19th congressional district 2023–present	Incumbent
U.S. order of precedence (ceremonial)
Preceded by Brian Mast	United States representatives by seniority 174th	Succeeded by Jamie Raskin
