= Charles I. D. Looff =

German carver and amusement park ride builder

Charles I.D. Looff
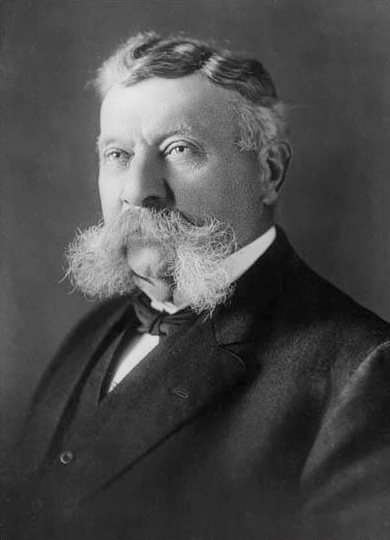
- Born: Carl Jürgen Detlef Looff; May 24, 1852; Bad Bramstedt, Duchy of Holstein
- Died: July 1, 1918 (aged 66); Long Beach, California, U.S.
- Occupations: Builder and carver of carousels and amusement rides
- Spouse: Anna Dolle (m. 1874)
- Children: Anna (1875-1896); Helen (1877-1956); Emma (1879-1938); Charles (1881-1924); William (1883-1945); Arthur (1888-1970)

Charles I. D. Looff (born Carl Jürgen Detlef Looff) was a German master carver and builder of hand-carved carousels and amusement rides, who immigrated to the United States of America in 1870. Looff built the first carousel at Coney Island in 1876. During his lifetime, he built over 40 carousels, several amusements parks, numerous roller coasters and Ferris wheels, and built California's famous Santa Monica Pier. He became famous for creating the unique Coney Island style of carousel carving.

== Early years ==
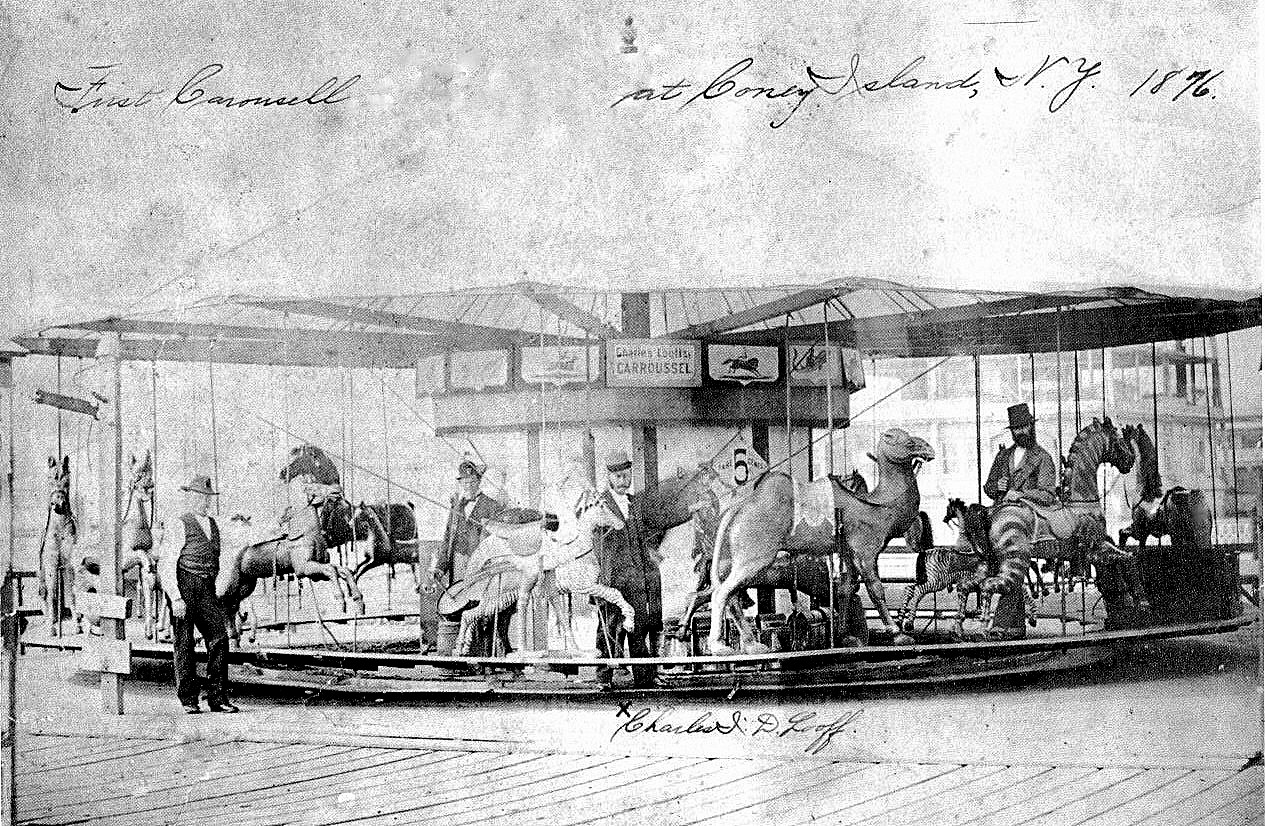
Looff installed this carousel at the Bathing Pavilion of Lucy Vanderveer in 1876, becoming the first amusement ride to operate in Coney Island.

Looff was born as Carl Jürgen Detlef Looff on May 24, 1852 in Bad Bramstedt, in Holstein. His father, Jürgen Detlef Christian Looff, was a master blacksmith and wagon builder. Watching his father, Carl learned how to work with metal and wood. To avoid involvement in the Franco-Prussian War, Carl emigrated to the United States. Arriving in Castle Garden, New York City, on August 14, 1870, he changed his first name to Charles. In low German, the letters I and J look very much alike, and confusion set in as to his initials. Somehow, his name became Charles I. D. Looff instead of J. D. Looff.

Settling on Leonard Street in Greenpoint, Brooklyn, he found work as a carver at a furniture factory. Working part-time as a ballroom dance instructor, Looff met and married Anna Dolle, also from Germany, in 1874. After working in the furniture factory all day, he took scraps of wood home to his apartment and began carving them into carousel animals. Young Looff assembled his wooden horses and animals onto a circular platform and created his first merry-go-round. In 1876, he installed his ride at Lucy Vandeveer's Bathing Pavilion at West Sixth Street and Surf Avenue. This was Coney Island's first carousel and first amusement ride.

Looff opened a factory at 30 Bedford Avenue in Brooklyn and continued building more carousels. He installed a merry-go-round at a restaurant and beer garden on Surf Avenue, Coney Island owned by Charles Feltman, one of several people credited with inventing the American hot dog. Looff installed another machine at Coney Island and then created a large ride for Asbury Park in New Jersey. Looff began to hire expert carvers such as John Zalar, Marcus Illions, John Mueller and Charles Carmel to help with his expanding business.

Charles and Anna had six children: Anna (1875–1896), Helen (1877–1956), Emma (1879–1938), Charles (1881–1924), William (1883–1945), Arthur (1888–1970). All except Anna, who died at age 21 as a result of a trolley accident, would work with their father in some way in the carousel business. When the City of New York took his property under eminent domain to build a city park, Looff moved his family to Crescent Park, in Riverside, Rhode Island.

== Rhode Island years ==
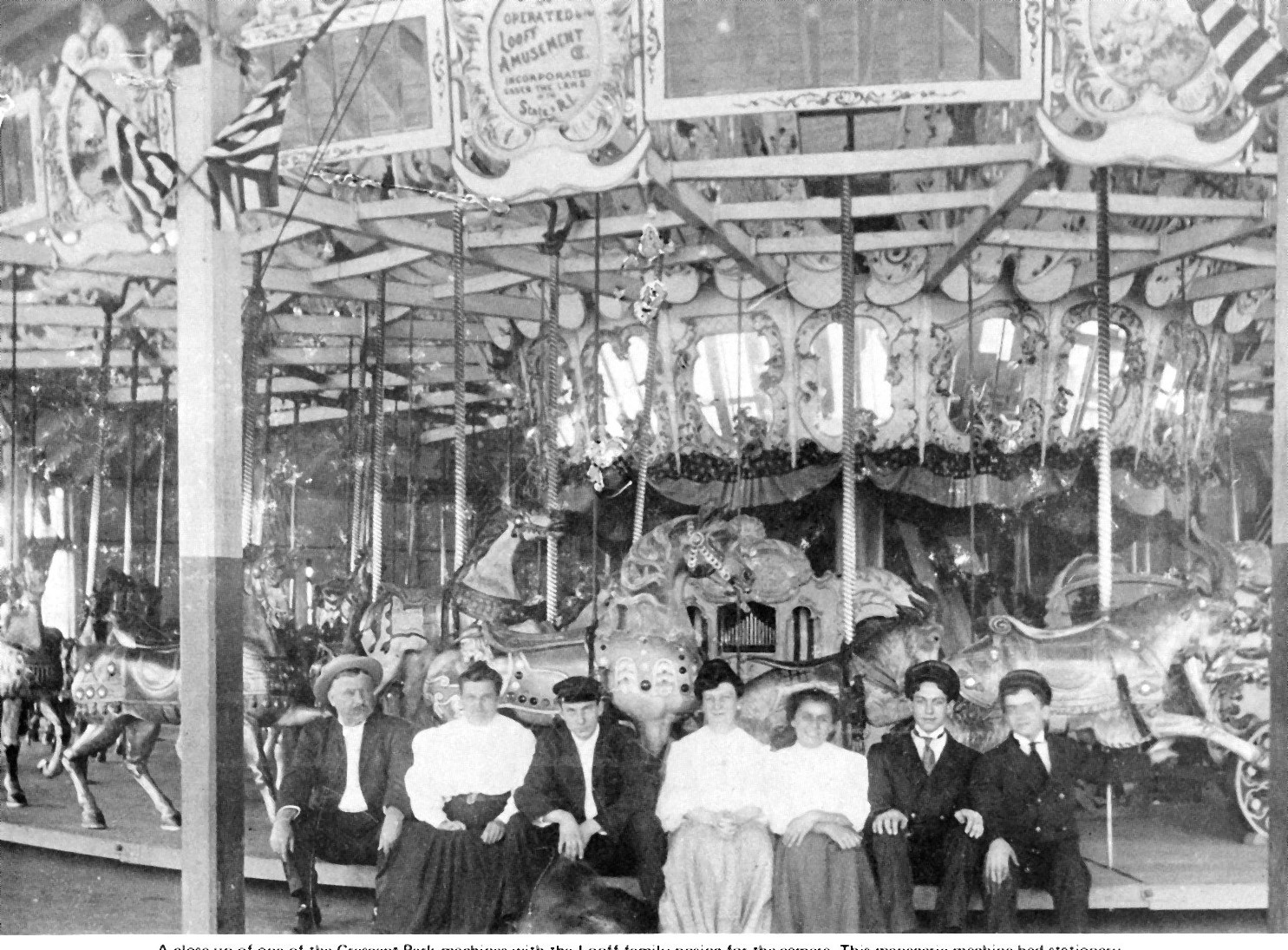
Charles I. D. Looff family at the Crescent Park Carousel in Riverside, Rhode Island, c. 1905

In 1886, Colonel George Boyden established an amusement park named Crescent Park in Riverside, Rhode Island on 50 acres (200,000 m^{2}) overlooking Narragansett Bay. Boyden commissioned Charles I. D. Looff to build a large carousel at the head of a 400-foot (120 m) pier that received throngs of people from the steamboats that cruised up and down the bay. Crescent Park became known as "the Coney Island of the East" during this time.

In 1895, Looff built a larger and more elaborate carousel overlooking the midway which contains 61 horses, one camel, two single chariots, and two double chariots. He used this ride as a showpiece for prospective buyers to choose the types of carved horses for their machines. Looff built his workshop adjoining the carousel where he produced many merry-go-rounds for amusement parks in New England and across the United States. His daughter Helen and her husband Charles Simmons bought the ride from Looff's widow's estate in 1930. This carousel is now owned by the city of East Providence, Rhode Island and has been fully restored. It is still operating in its original location and was placed on the National Register of Historic Places in 1976.

In 1985, the Rhode Island General Assembly proclaimed the carousel as the "State Jewel of American Folk Art". In 1987, the National Park Service designated it as a National Historic Landmark.

Looff's son Charles Jr. worked in the shop carving saddles and chariots for his father. In 1920, he purchased Crescent Park and operated it until his death in 1925 at age 44. He built an excursion boat which he named the Miss Looff in honor of his sister Anna. This boat cruised the waters of Narragansett Bay, bringing customers to Crescent Park from Providence and Newport, Rhode Island.

In the early 1900s, Looff built carousels and figure-eight roller coasters for the Texas and Oklahoma state fairs. In 1909, he built a carousel with 54 horses and presented it to his daughter Emma as a wedding present. The ride was installed at Natatorium Park in Spokane, Washington. This ride has been restored and operates today at Riverfront Park in Spokane.

== California years ==
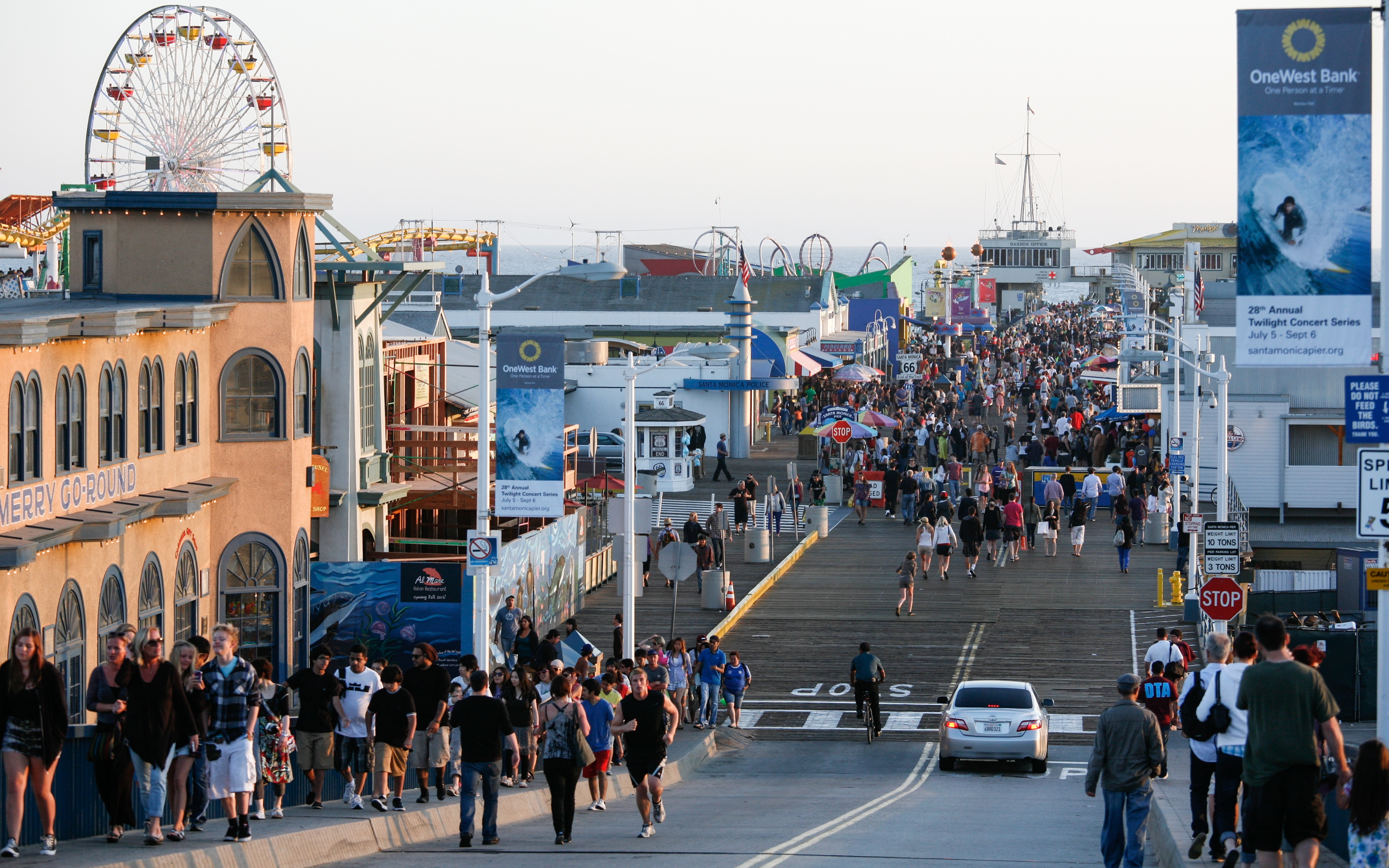
The Santa Monica Pier in 2012 with the Santa Monica Looff Hippodrome visible on the far left. Looff built both structures in 1916.

Looff, meanwhile, had become enchanted with the possibilities for amusement parks on the West Coast and in August 1910 moved to California, leaving his daughter Helen (and her husband Charles Simmons) and his son, Charles Looff Jr. (and his wife Emma Simmons Looff), to manage the family properties in Rhode Island. Looff settled in Long Beach and built a factory on West Sixth Street. He purchased property at The Pike, an amusement area on Long Beach's waterfront, and built a magnificent merry-go-round there. The family lived in an apartment above the ride. Son, Arthur, also operated Lite-a-Line, a type of redemption game at the Pike that is still in operation today at 2500 Long Beach Boulevard in Long Beach. It was subsequently moved in the early part of the 21st century. It also houses a small but very detailed and vivid museum in honor of his carvings and ride technology but most specifically Looff's Long Beach Pike enterprise. In 1943, fire destroyed the Pike carousel. Son Arthur replaced it with another Looff merry-go-round.

In 1916, Looff with his son, Arthur, designed and built Looff's Santa Monica Pier along the south side of the city's long, narrow, municipal pier. They constructed a large Byzantine-Moorish style "Hippodrome" building to house one of their ornate carousels, now known as the Santa Monica Looff Hippodrome. The Looffs also erected the Blue Streak Racer wooden roller coaster on their new pleasure pier, along with The Whip and the Aeroscope thrill ride.

In addition to Santa Monica and the Pike, Looff built and operated amusement parks and carousels at Ocean Park, Redondo Beach, Venice Beach, and Santa Cruz, as well as Griffith Park in Los Angeles (still in operation) which coincidentally is the carousel that helped inspire Walt Disney to design and eventually build Disneyland and Disney World. Disneyland Resorts has on display the actual park bench that Disney sat on as he watched his daughters ride the merry-go-round and day-dreamed about a new type of totally immersive theme park experience. There has also been a Looff carousel horse added to the exhibit at the entrance to the "Moments with Lincoln" attraction at Disneyland in Anaheim. Looff built a short-lived amusement park in Seattle called Luna Park. The carousel at Luna Park had been planned for San Francisco, but the infamous earthquake prompted Looff to create Luna Park in Seattle instead.

Charles I. D. Looff died on July 1, 1918, aged 66, in Long Beach, California. After his death, his son Arthur continued to manage the family's West Coast operation, including building the Giant Dipper roller coaster at the Santa Cruz Beach Boardwalk.

The Santa Monica Looff Hippodrome and the Santa Cruz Looff Carousel and Roller Coaster were both designated National Historic Landmarks in 1987.

== Looff carousels ==
List by original location
Year	Name	Original location	Notes
1876	Vandeveer's Bathing Pavilion Carousel	Coney Island, New York	Name changed to Balmer's Bathing Pavilion. Menagerie ride with no jumpers, the first of over 25 carousels at Coney Island.
1877	Feltman's Carousel	Feltman's Beer Garden, Coney Island, New York	Menagerie, no jumpers, built, partially burned in the West Brighton fire of 1899, or possibly earlier because Feltman (the inventor of the hot dog) bought a second carousel from Looff in the 1890s.
1880	Coney Island Carousel	Coney Island, New York	
1884	Roger Williams Park Carousel	Providence, Rhode Island	Moved to Slater Park, Pawtucket, Rhode Island, in 1910. 3-abreast stationary. Was the fastest Looff carousel but was slowed down in recent years. Listed on National Register of Historic Places.
1886	Midland Beach Carousel	Staten Island, New York	Operated 1890 to 1905, 3 abreast, menagerie. Carousel was moved to Keansburg, New Jersey by Frank Drodge, opening in 1913 after being refurbished by Mangels. Mr. Drodge sold the carousel to R.A.C. Amusements in 1966. The carousel stayed in operation at the Keansburg amusement park until all horses and animals were sold by Gournseys auction in 1985. The Looff then ran for another decade with Thiel horses on it until it was sold off and replaced with other attractions.
1888	Wesley Lake Carousel	Asbury Park, New Jersey	All horses had real horsehair tails. A few animals were carved by Gustav Dentzel to meet a deadline for the three-row, brass ring carousel. Operated 1888-1988 until the beach-front, indoor amusement park, Palace Amusements, closed. The 78 animals were individually auctioned & the Carousel unit as one piece. Palace Amusements was put on the National Register of Historic Places before being demolished in 2004.
1889	Salisbury Beach Carousel	Salisbury, Massachusetts	1889 to 1907
1890	Broadway Flying Horses Carousel	Coney Island, New York	Located at Coney Island until 1905. At Salisbury Beach, Massachusetts. from 1914-1976. Moved to Seaport Village, San Diego, California, in 1980.
1890 to 1897	South Beach Carousel	Staten Island, New York	
1891	Rocky Point Amusement Park Carousel	Warwick, Rhode Island	Looff also built a "Fandango" Ferris Wheel with 16 gondolas made from 4-seater carousel chariots.
1892	Young's Ocean Pier Carousel	Atlantic City, New Jersey	
1890 to 1897	Narragansett Pier Carousel	Narragansett, Rhode Island	
1895	Crescent Park Carousel	Riverside, East Providence, Rhode Island	Used by Looff as showcase for his work, all animals different; operational brass rings; Ruth & Sons organ; listed on National Register of Historic Places
1895	Lincoln Park Carousel	Dartmouth, Massachusetts	
1896	Savin Rock Park Carousel	West Haven, Connecticut	Moved to Lake Compounce, Bristol, Connecticut in 1911
c. 1893	Roger Williams Park Carousel	Providence, Rhode Island	Replaced in 1937 with PTC #44
1894	The Looff Carousel at Slater Park	Slater Memorial Park, Pawtucket, Rhode Island	Originally located at Roger Williams Park, Providence, RI. Moved to present location in 1910. Originally was fastest Looff carousel made-was slowed down recently. Listed on National Register of Historic Places.
1898	Burlington Island Park	Burlington, New Jersey	Moved to Seaside Heights, NJ in 1932. The chariots and some animals were carved by Dentzel, Morris, Carmel, and Illions. Located in a 10-sided unenclosed building on boardwalk pier; 4 Rows, 35 Jumping Horses, 18 Standing Horses, 5 Menagerie Animals (1 Lion, 1 Tiger, 1 Mule, 2 Camels), 2 Chariots, 2016 Lightbulbs, and 15 original antique paintings from 1910 in center casing. The music is provided by the only continuously operating Wurlitzer 146 Military Band Organ in the state. Dr. Floyd L. Moreland bought and restored it in 1984. The carousel survived Hurricane Sandy in 2012.
1898	Canobie Lake Park Carousel	Salem, New Hampshire	Moved to present location in 1906
1889	Salisbury Beach Carousel	Salisbury, Massachusetts	1889 to 1907
1898	Rosen Heights Carousel	Fort Worth, Texas	1898 to 1907.
1902/1909(Looff-Murphy Bros. Conversion)	Sherman's Carousel	Caroga Lake, New York	Looff/Murphy carousel platform and mechanism populated with 50 metal animals by (Theel mfg.), in original 12-sided Looff carousel building w/ stained glass windows. Eighteen jumpers and no chariots. Original hand-carved Looff animals were sold in late 1970s to private collectors. Carousel is owned privately but operated by CarogaArts Collective and open to the public on a limited basis. This carousel is thought to have been relocated to Sherman’s in the 1930s from a park in Utica, New York. *Note: This carousel is almost identical to the one operated at Lake Compounce in Connecticut.
1900	Lakeside Park Carousel	Syracuse, New York	Moved 1908 to Rocky Point Amusement Park, Warwick, Rhode Island, and 1930 to Goddard Park, Warwick, Rhode Island
1903	Lakeside Park Carousel	Port Dalhousie, Ontario	Moved to present location in 1921
1904	Seaport Village Carousel	Dallas, Texas	1958 to 1967: Pacific Ocean Park, Santa Monica, California; 1967 to 1982: Spanaway, Washington; 1982 to 1992: Willamette Center, Portland, Oregon; 1992 to 1997: AmeriFlora '92, Columbus, Ohio; 1997 to 2004: Media City Center Mall, Burbank, California; 2004 to present: Seaport Village, San Diego, California.
1905	Island Park Carousel	Portsmouth, Rhode Island	Survived 1938 hurricane
1905	Rosen Heights Carousel	Fort Worth, Texas	1905 to 1907
1906	The Children's Creativity Museum—LeRoy King Carousel (previously named the Zeum Carousel)	Yerba Buena Gardens, San Francisco, California	Built in 1906 for San Francisco, sent instead to Seattle's Luna Park due to 1906 earthquake, returned to Playland-at-the-Beach, San Francisco, in 1914 until 1972; 1972 to 1983: In storage at Roswell, New Mexico for restoration; 1983 to 1998: Shoreline Village, California; 1998: Yerba Buena Gardens, San Francisco, California
1908	Heritage Museum Carousel	Heritage Museums and Gardens, Sandwich, Massachusetts	Original location Crescent Park, Riverside, Rhode Island, moved to Meridian, Mississippi, then to Provincetown, Massachusetts, then to present location in 1969
1908	Burlington Island Park Carousel	Burlington, New Jersey	Moved to Casino Pier, Seaside Heights, NJ in 1932. The chariots and some animals were carved by Dentzel, Morris, Carmel and Illions. Located in a ten-sided open building on boardwalk pier - 4-abreast, 35 jumpers, 18 standers, 5 menagerie (Lion, Tiger, Mule, 2 Camels), 2 Chariots, 2016 light bulbs, and 15 original antique paintings from 1910 on center casing. Music provided by the only continuously operating Wurlitzer 146 Military Band Organ in the state. Dr. Floyd L. Moreland bought and restored the ride in 1984. The carousel survived Hurricane Sandy in 2012.
1908	Lighthouse Point Park Carousel	New Haven, Connecticut	Moved to present location in 1916
1909	Harveys Lake	Harveys Lake, Pennsylvania	Originally located in Harveys Lake, Pennsylvania, moved to Florida in 1986 and International Market World, Auburndale, Florida, in 1996
1909	Natatorium Park	Spokane, Washington	A wedding gift for Looff's daughter Emma Looff and her husband Louis Vogel, who later owned Natatorium Park; moved to present location at Riverfront Park in Spokane in 1975; operational brass rings; Ruth & Sons organ; National Historic Landmark
1896 or 1898	Whalom Park Carousel	Pleasure Bay Park, Long Branch, NJ	Moved from Long Branch to Bradley Beach, NJ in 1910 and then to Whalom Park in 1914; featured 4 Looff greyhounds and 2 Looff Sea Dragons. Broken up at auction April 15, 2000
1909	Oklahoma State Fair Carousel	Oklahoma City, Oklahoma	With a figure-8 coaster
1910	Saltair Park Carousel	Salt Lake City, Utah	Moved to American Fork, Utah, in 1959 and sold for parts in 1986; Moved to Nederland, Colorado. Scott Harrison used the Looff frame and installed new, whimsically-carved figures.
1910	Fraser's Million Dollar Pier Carousel	Santa Monica, California	Burned down in September 1912
1911	The Pike Carousel	Long Beach, California	Burned down in 1943
1911	Santa Cruz Beach Boardwalk Carousel	Santa Cruz, California	National Historic Landmark, brass rings, still in use at original location
1911	Fantasy Fair Carousel	Fantasy Fair (Woodbine Centre),Toronto, Ontario	Originally built in Long Beach, CA, sold by Bud Hurlbut and moved to present location in 1985; Looff platform with replica fiberglass animals c. 1980s. Previously at Redondo Beach.
1911	Venice Pier Carousel	Venice, California	
c. 1913	Grand Carousel	Knoebels, Elysburg, Pennsylvania	Moved to present location in 1942 from Riverside Park in Piscataway Township, New Jersey; Looff frame, Carmel horses; operational brass rings
1915	Pan Pacific International Exposition Carousel	San Francisco, California	The Exposition celebrated the opening of the Panama Canal.
1916	Santa Monica Pier Carousel	Santa Monica, California	Replaced in 1947 with PTC #62; Looff Hippodrome carousel building is a National Historic Landmark. Looff also built the Big Dipper Coaster.
1925	Redondo Beach Carousel	Redondo Beach, California	After being removed from Redondo Beach, the carousel remained in the Looff factory which was purchased by Ross R. Davis and his son John O. Davis. Some of the outside row figures remained with the Looff family.
1926	Griffith Park Merry-Go-Round	Griffith Park, Los Angeles, California	Spillman/Looff mix. The carousel, which is still running, was originally a Spillman. After the Davis family purchased the contents of the Looff factory, some of the Looff figures were interspersed with the original Spillmans.
1928	Lakewood Park Carousel	Barnesville, Pennsylvania	Moved to Van Andel Museum, Grand Rapids, Michigan, in 1982
