= Spillman Engineering 3-Abreast Carousel =

Carousel in San Jose, California

- U.S. National Register of Historic Places
- Location within San Jose, California
- Location: 139 B Eastridge Mall, San Jose, California, US
- Coordinates: 37°19′33″N 121°46′47″W
- Built: 1920; 106 years ago
- Built by: Allan Herschell Company
- Architectural style: Country Fair style
- NRHP reference No.: 00000366
- Added to NRHP: April 13, 2000

The Spillman Engineering 3-Abreast Carousel is a carousel built in 1920 by the Allan Herschell Company. It was formerly located in the Eastridge shopping Center, San Jose, California. The carousel features 30 hand-carved jumping wooden horses and two hand-carved chariots that serve as benches. It was one of only four large carousels made by the Allan Herschell Company between 1915 and 1927. The carousel was officially recognized and listed on the National Register of Historic Places on April 13, 2000. It is owned by the Perron family.

== History ==
In 1901, Allen Herschell created the Herschell Spillman Company with his in-laws, the Spillmans. The Herschell Spillman Company was later sold to Allen Herschell Company, Inc. The company later dropped Herschell's name and was known as the Spillman Engineering Company. The Spillman Engineering Carousel was built in 1920 by the Spillman Engineering Company from North Tonawanda, New York. It was restored and installed at the Eastridge Shopping Center in San Jose in 1993.

The carousel was utilized on the traveling fairgrounds along the eastern coast before being acquired by Whale's Tail Amusement Park in New Hampshire around 1945. Specific dates of acquisition and utilization are uncertain, as records were not maintained for this carousel. In 1989, the last proprietors acquired the carousel from Whale's Tail following the closure of the park.

== Design ==
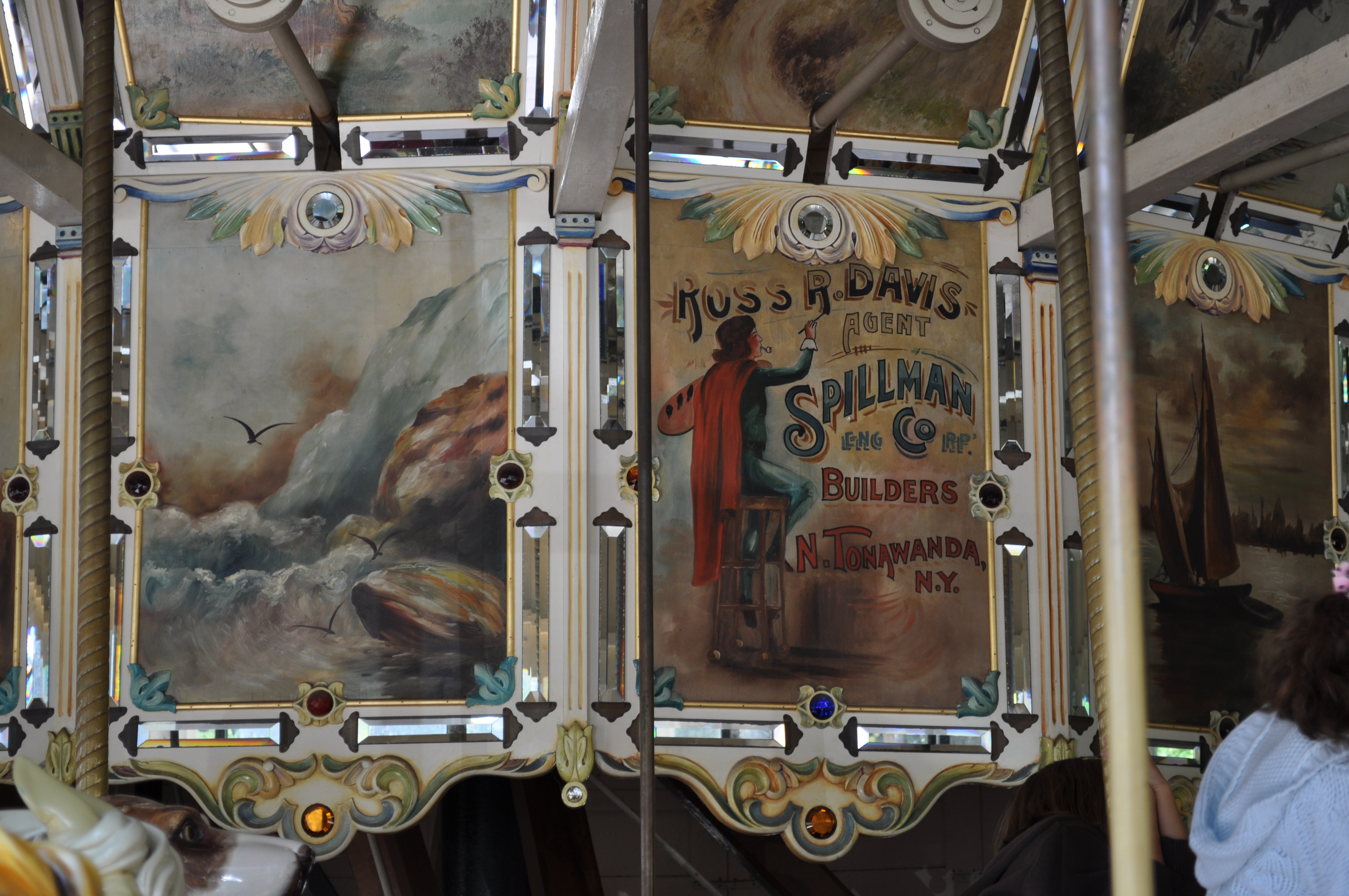
Spillman carousel with company's "signature" panel

The Spillman Engineering Carousel was in the Country Fair style, with a platform diameter of 36 ft (11 m), and a wooden center pole 17 ft (5.2 m) high. The original flooring consisted of planks with spaces between them. Because shoes could get caught in these gaps, the original floor was substituted in 1992 with a solid wood platform. The original floor was moved to the International Museum of Carousel Art's warehouse in Hood River, Oregon.

The carousel comprised 12 sections called sweeps, which extend outward from the center pole to support the platform, 30 all-jumping hand-carved wooden horses, a pair of chariots benches, and 12 wooden curved decorative rounding boards placed side-by-side and form a complete circle around the top of the carousel. The twelve rounding boards are characteristic of a typical Spillman Engineering carousel. The rounding boards have wooden scroll-carved shields, each featuring oval mirrors. The center scenery panels on the carousel had oil paintings that have been restored and remain authentic. Typical features of this carousel include wooden platforms, adorned wooden rounding boards, hand-carved wooden animals.

The carousel operated using an electric motor powering its drive mechanism, along with a hydraulic fluid clutch connected to a gearbox chain drive, rotating the gears under the sweeps. The horses' up-and-down action was facilitated by a method involving an overhead crank, where the upward movement was determined by the height of the U-shaped crank from which it hangs. Previously, the carousel worked with an electric motor controlled from within. In 1992, this motor was replaced with an electric 3.5 horsepower motor, which was operated from outside the carousel via a push-button method in compliance with California safety regulations. Recorded band organ music was played through the center facade while the carousel was in motion. The central pole, sweeps, sweeps, and panels of the carousel were made of wood and remain original to this carousel.

The carousel had 30 all-jumping style horses carved from basswood, each with glass eyes, colored glass jewel decorations, cast metal horseshoes, and carved wooden tails. These horses displayed proportionately carved bodies with gentle-looking faces, characteristic of Spillman's horse carvings. All horses were authentic to the carousel and underwent restoration in 1992. The chariot benches were authentic to the carousel and underwent restoration in 1992.

== Historical status ==
The Spillman Engineering Carousel was placed on the National Register of Historic Places on April 13, 2000.

The Spillman Carousel is historically significant as a well-preserved instance of a recreational genre, exhibiting the evolution of animal carving as a "utilitarian" artistic practice, where carvers competed to produce the most innovative and vibrant attractions. Additionally, it was originally constructed as a compact, easily transportable carousel, intended to be relocated from one place to another. This American-made carousel was crafted during the latter part of the golden era of carousels (1835-1935), and the pinnacle of amusement park popularity.

== See also ==
- Amusement rides on the National Register of Historic Places
- Herschell Carrousel Factory Museum
- National Register of Historic Places listings in Santa Clara County, California
