= Allan Herschell 3-Abreast Carousel =

- U.S. National Register of Historic Places
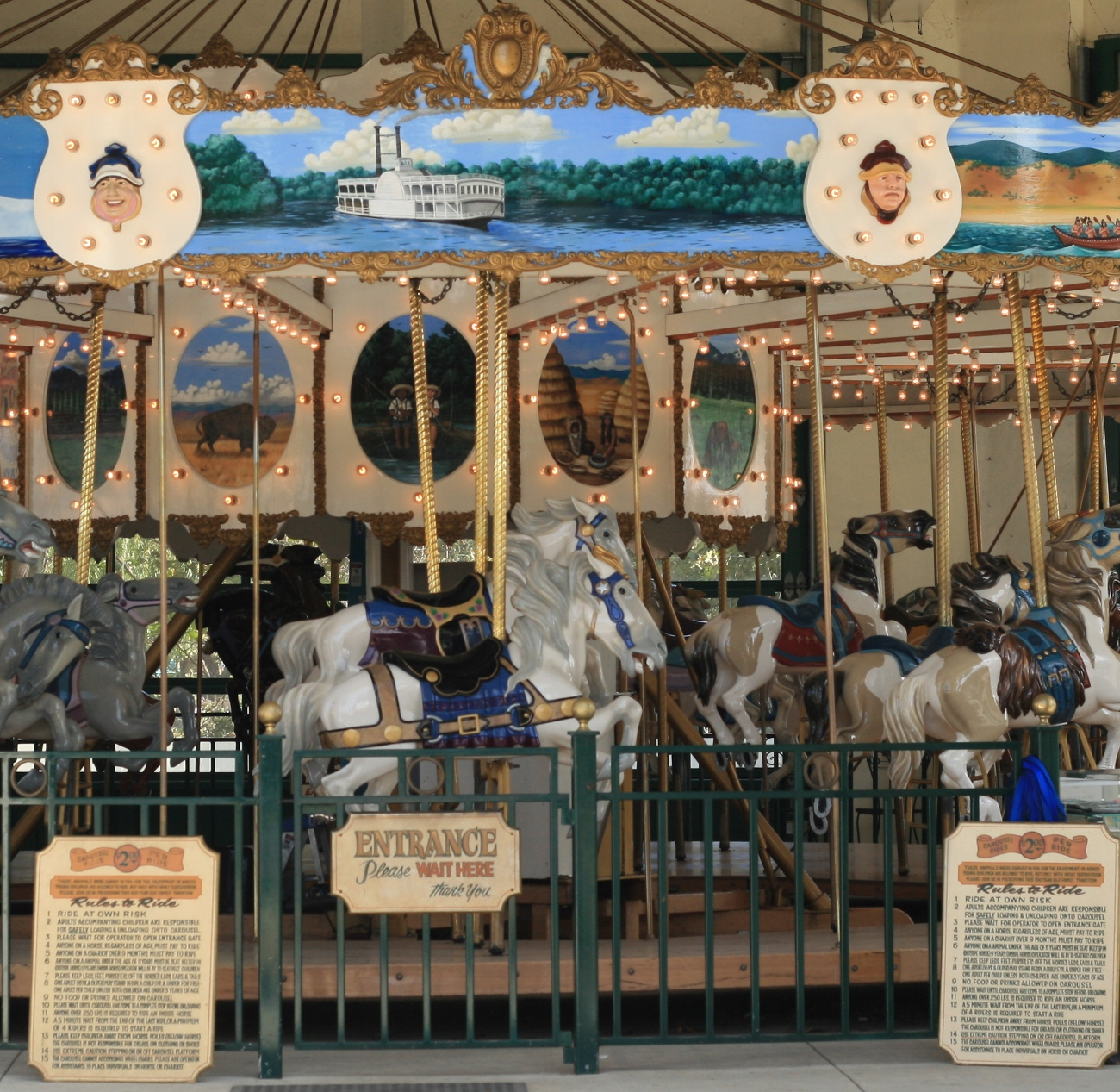

- Location within California Location within the United States
- Location: 223 East Cabrillo Boulevard, Santa Barbara, California
- Coordinates: 34°24′54.31″N 119°41′5.23″W
- Built: 1916
- Architect: Allan Herschell
- NRHP reference No.: 00000363
- Added to NRHP: April 13, 2000

The Allan Herschell 3-Abreast Carousel is a carousel built in 1916 by the Allan Herschell Company. It features 35 hand-carved jumping wooden horses and two hand-carved chariots which serve as benches. The carousel is one of only four large carousels made by the Allan Herschell Company between 1915 and 1927; in addition, the horses on the outer rim feature gentle faces and detailed, deep woodwork, making them a rarity among the company's designs. It is owned by the Perron family.

After likely operating in an amusement park in the eastern United States, the carousel moved to Seaport Village in San Diego, in 1977; then it was restored in 1997; then it began operating in Chase Palm Park in Santa Barbara, California, in 1999.

The carousel listed on the National Register of Historic Places in 2000.

The company broke its lease due to winter revenues in 2017. The facility closed after a weekend carnival in early December, 2017, with free rides for everyone. Then the carousel itself has been relocated to a museum of historically significant carousels in Hood River, Oregon which is scheduled to open in 2019.

== See also ==
- Amusement rides on the National Register of Historic Places
