= Perron family =

American family known for historic carousel preservation

The Perron family is an American family known for preserving historic carousels. Wife and husband team Carol and Duane Perron began collecting individual carousel figures and later entire carousels in the 1970s. As of 2024, the family owns 21 complete carousels and over 1,200 carousel animals; it is the largest collection of its kind in the world. Although they operate or were operated in various locations throughout the United States and Canada, the majority of their carousels are stored in a warehouse in Dee, Oregon, south of Hood River, Oregon. The collection is currently maintained by Carol and Duane's son Brad Perron, who, along with his wife Sarah Perron, also own two historic buildings in Hood River. Those two buildings, along with six of their carousels, are listed or were previously listed on the National Register of Historic Places (NRHP).

== Perron family-owned NRHP listings ==
I’d much rather paint a horse than anything on canvas. When the paint gets on them, they gain their personality. They come alive.

— Carol Perron, historic carousel preservationist, 1997

Color code
	National Register of Historic Places
^{*}	NRHP-delisted

=== Carousels ===
Carousels
# (Note: Numbers represent an alphabetical ordering by state/territory and then city, and if applicable, borough and then neighborhood. Various colorings, defined here, differentiate National Historic Landmarks and historic districts from other NRHP buildings, structures, sites, or objects.)	Name on the Register	Image	Date listed (Note: The eight-digit number below each date is the number assigned to each location in the National Register Information System database, which can be viewed by clicking the number.)	Location	City or town	Description
1	Spillman Engineering 3-Abreast Carousel		April 13, 2000 (#00000366)	139 B Eastridge; 37°19′32″N 121°48′50″W	San Jose, California	Built c. 1920. Moved to Eastridge shopping mall in 1993 and received its NRHP listing there in 2000. Owned by Perron family.
2	Allan Herschell 3-Abreast Carousel	Allan Herschell 3-Abreast Carousel	April 13, 2000 (#00000363)	Chase Palm Park; 223 E. Cabrillo Blvd. 34°24′54″N 119°41′10″W	Santa Barbara, California	Built in 1916. Located in Chase Palm Park until 2017. Owned by Perron family.
3	Philadelphia Toboggan Company Carousel Number 15	Philadelphia Toboggan Company Carousel Number 15	June 8, 2001 (#01000583)	Palisades Center; 1000 Palisades Center; 41°05′48″N 73°57′21″W	West Nyack, New York	Built c. 1907. Located in Palisades Center shopping mall until 2009. In storage in Portland, Oregon, as of 2010. Owned by Perron family.
4	William F. Mangels Four-Row Carousel	William F. Mangels Four-Row Carousel	August 26, 1987 (#87001383)	4033 SW Canyon Rd. 45°30′37″N 122°43′04″W	Portland, Oregon	Built c. 1914. Moved to World Forestry Center in 1978 and received its NRHP listing there in 1987. Owned by Perron family.

==== Former carousel listings ====
#	Name on the Register	Image	Date listed	Date removed	Location	City or town	Description
1^{*}	Charles Looff 20-Sweep Menagerie Carousel	Charles Looff 20-Sweep Menagerie Carousel	August 26, 1987 (#87001379)	May 27, 1998	Holladay St. at NE. Eighth Ave. 45°31′47″N 122°39′27″W	Portland, Oregon	Built in 1895. Located in Seaport Village in San Diego, California, since 2004. Owned by Perron family.
2^{*}	Allan Herschell Two-Abreast Carousel		August 26, 1987 (#87001382)	May 27, 1998	300 Broadway; 45°59′37″N 123°55′35″W	Seaside, Oregon	Built c. 1926. Moved to Seaside Town Center shopping mall in 1987 and received its NRHP listing there that same year. In storage as of 2011. Owned by Perron family.

=== Buildings ===
Carousels
#	Name on the Register	Image	Date listed	Location	City or town	Description
1	First National Bank of Hood River	First National Bank of Hood River	January 26, 2006 (#05001555)	304 Oak St. 45°42′33″N 121°30′49″W	Hood River, Oregon	Built in 1910. Former location of the Perron's defunct International Museum of Carousel Art. Owned by Perron family.
2	Heilbronner Block	Heilbronner Block	January 26, 2006 (#05001554)	110-118 3rd St. 45°42′34″N 121°30′49″W	Hood River, Oregon	Built in 1910. Owned by Perron family.

== See also ==
- Amusement rides on the National Register of Historic Places
