= First National Bank of Hood River =

- U.S. National Register of Historic Places
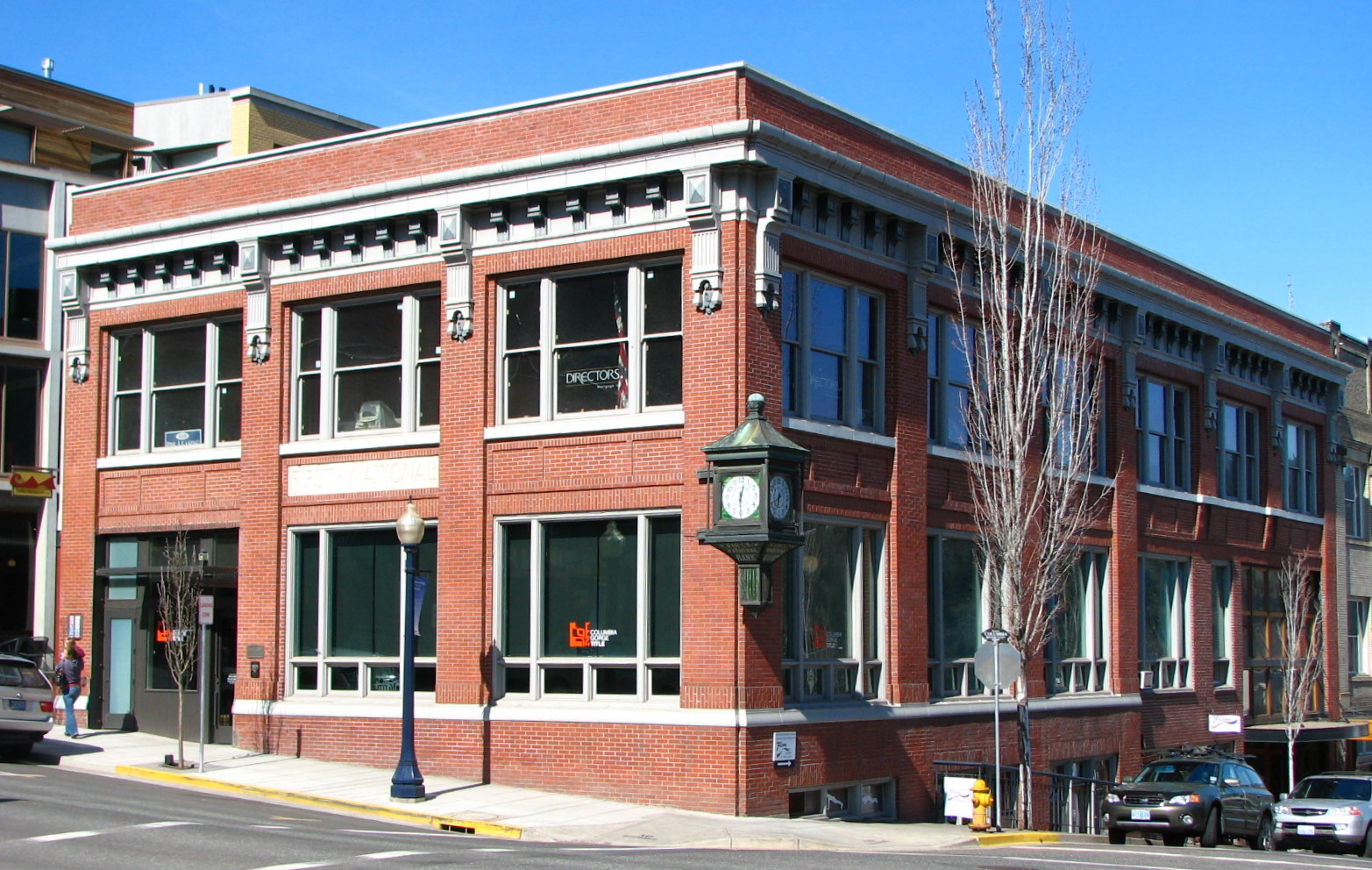
- The building's exterior in 2009

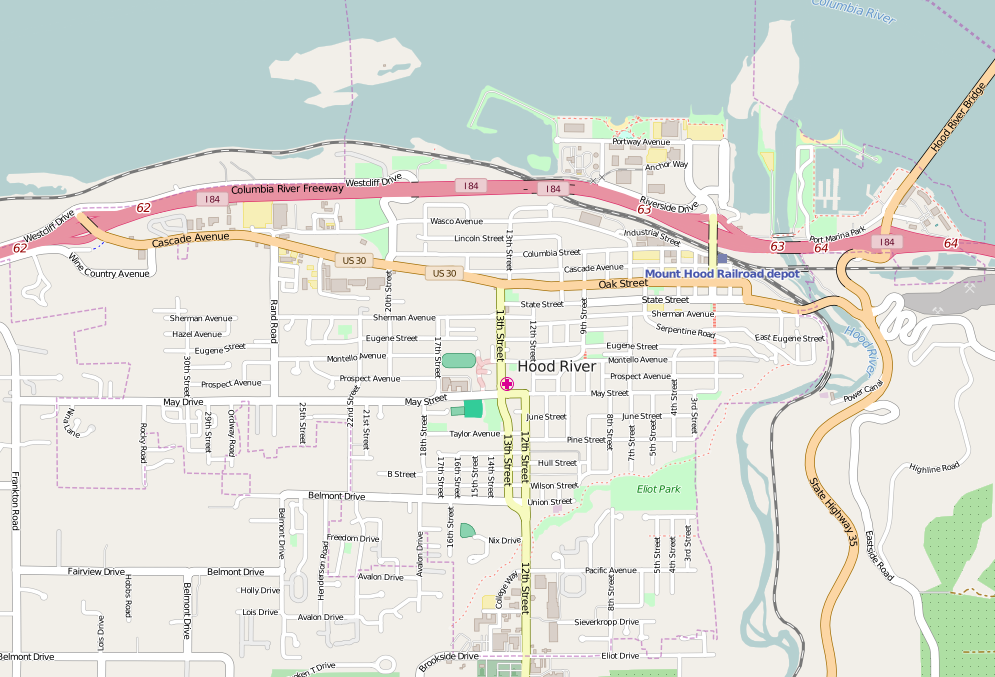
- Location within Hood River OR
- Location: 304 Oak Street; Hood River, Oregon
- Coordinates: 45°42′33″N 121°30′49″W
- Area: 5,000 square feet (460 m^{2}) (lot)
- Built: 1910
- Built by: J. M. Wright, L. M. Bentley
- Architect: Whidden and Lewis
- Architectural style: American Renaissance, with some Classical Revival details
- NRHP reference No.: 05001555
- Added to NRHP: January 26, 2006

The First National Bank of Hood River is a historic bank building located in downtown Hood River, Oregon, United States. The bank building was listed on the National Register of Historic Places (NRHP) in 2006. The building, along with the Heilbronner Block building next door (also listed on the NRHP), are owned by the Perron family.

== See also ==
- National Register of Historic Places listings in Hood River County, Oregon
