= Seaport Village Carousel =

Carousel in California

- Charles Looff 20-Sweep Menagerie Carousel
- Formerly listed on the U.S. National Register of Historic Places
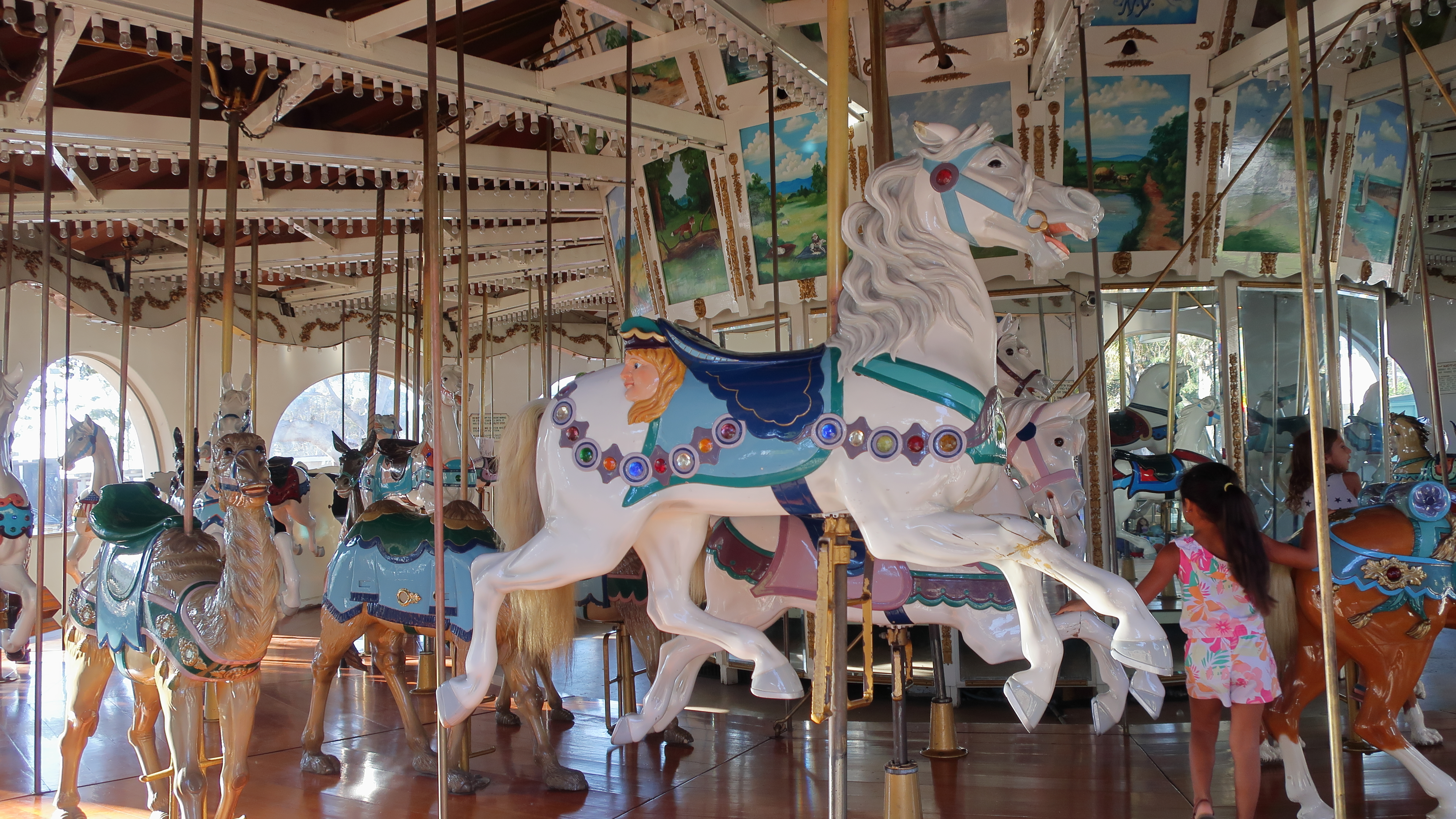
- Interior in 2018
- Location: Seaport Village, San Diego, California
- Coordinates: 32.7095°N 117.1714°W
- Built: 1895
- Architect: Charles I. D. Looff
- NRHP reference No.: 87001379

Significant dates
- Added to NRHP: August 26, 1987
- Removed from NRHP: May 27, 1998

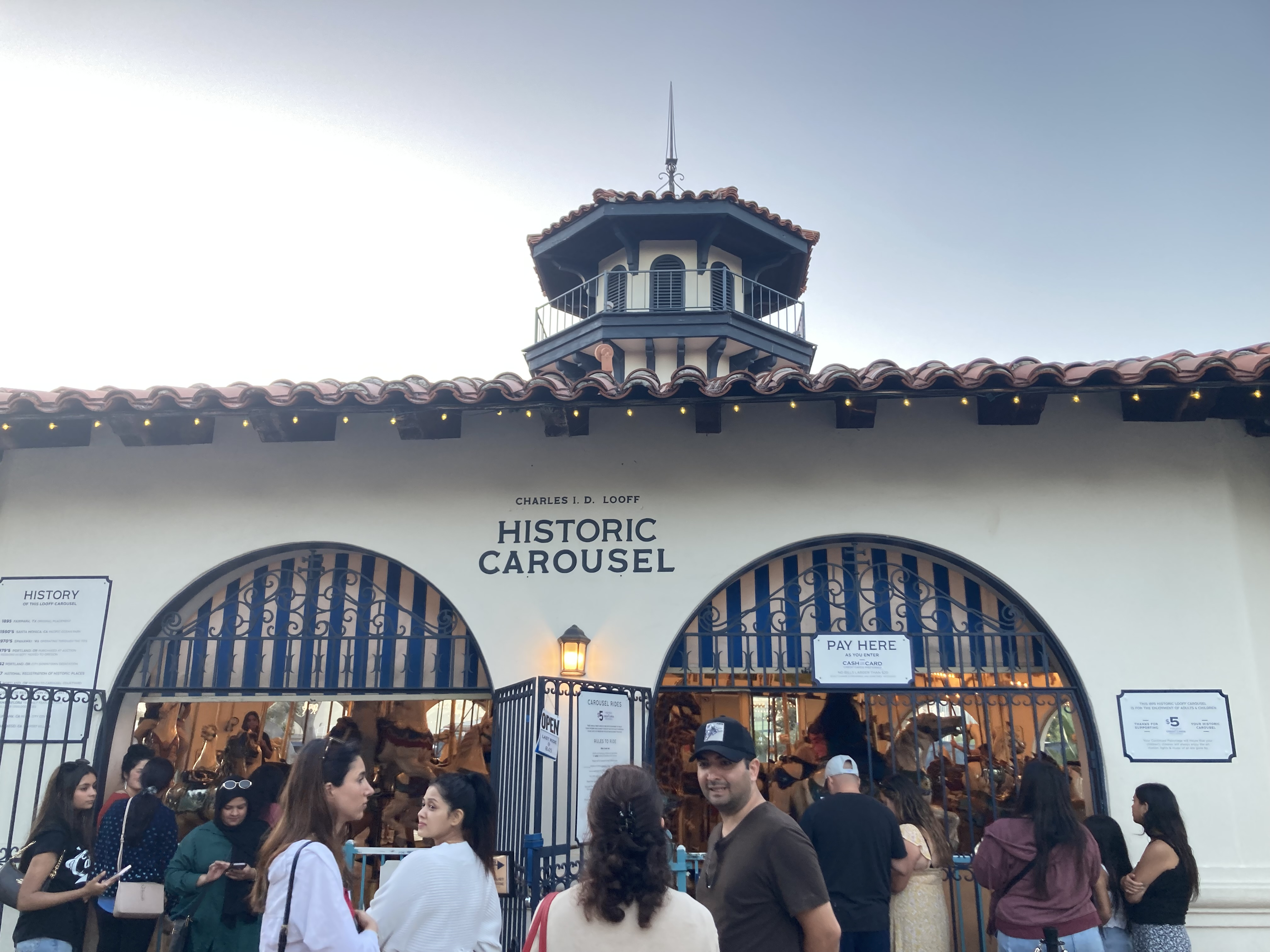
Exterior in 2024

The Seaport Village Carousel, also known as the Fair Park Looff Carousel, is a historic wooden carousel in the western wing of Seaport Village in San Diego, California. It was built by noted carver Charles I. D. Looff, who also constructed the Santa Monica Pier. The carousel costs a small fee to ride and contains 54 animals and 2 chariots. It is owned by the Perron family.

== History ==
Charles I. D. Looff hand-carved the carousel in Brooklyn, New York City, in 1895. It was not until 1904 when it was opened, however, when it debuted at Fair Park, in Dallas, Texas. It was not until the it was moved to Pacific Ocean Park in Santa Monica, California, in 1958 when the carousel had rounding boards and scenery panels installed. These were designed in a style reminiscent of the 1930s. It moved again in 1967 to an amusement park in Spanaway, Washington, where it stayed until 1982.

The Perron family had bought the carousel in September 1979 in an auction and transported it to Willamette Center in Portland, Oregon, in 1984. The Perrons converted all the figures on the carousel to Looff-made ones, as they had previously been made by other manufacturers. It moved to Lloyd Center in 1988. Historic Carousels, Inc. restored the carousel in 1991 to prepare it for the AmeriFlora '92 exhibition in Columbus, Ohio. It was later relocated to Burbank Town Center in Burbank, California, in 1997. The carousel moved to its current location in Seaport Village in 2004. It replaced the Broadway Flying Horses Carousel, which had been at the location since 1977.

== Features ==
The carousel is hand-carved nearly entirely from wood. With three rows, it has a menagerie style, with assorted animals being included aside from the horses. There are 54 animals in total, with 2 chariots that can hold multiple people. Out of the 54 animals, 30 are jumping horses and 11 are standing horses. The horses' tails are made of natural horsehair. The other 13 are the menagerie animals, with the carousel containing 3 camels, 3 giraffes, 1 teddy bear, 1 dog, 1 dragon, 1 goat, 1 lion, 1 burro, and 1 elephant. There is no fairground organ playing music at the carousel.

== See also ==
- Amusement rides on the National Register of Historic Places
