= Lakeside Park Carousel =

Carousel in St. Catharines, Ontario, Canada

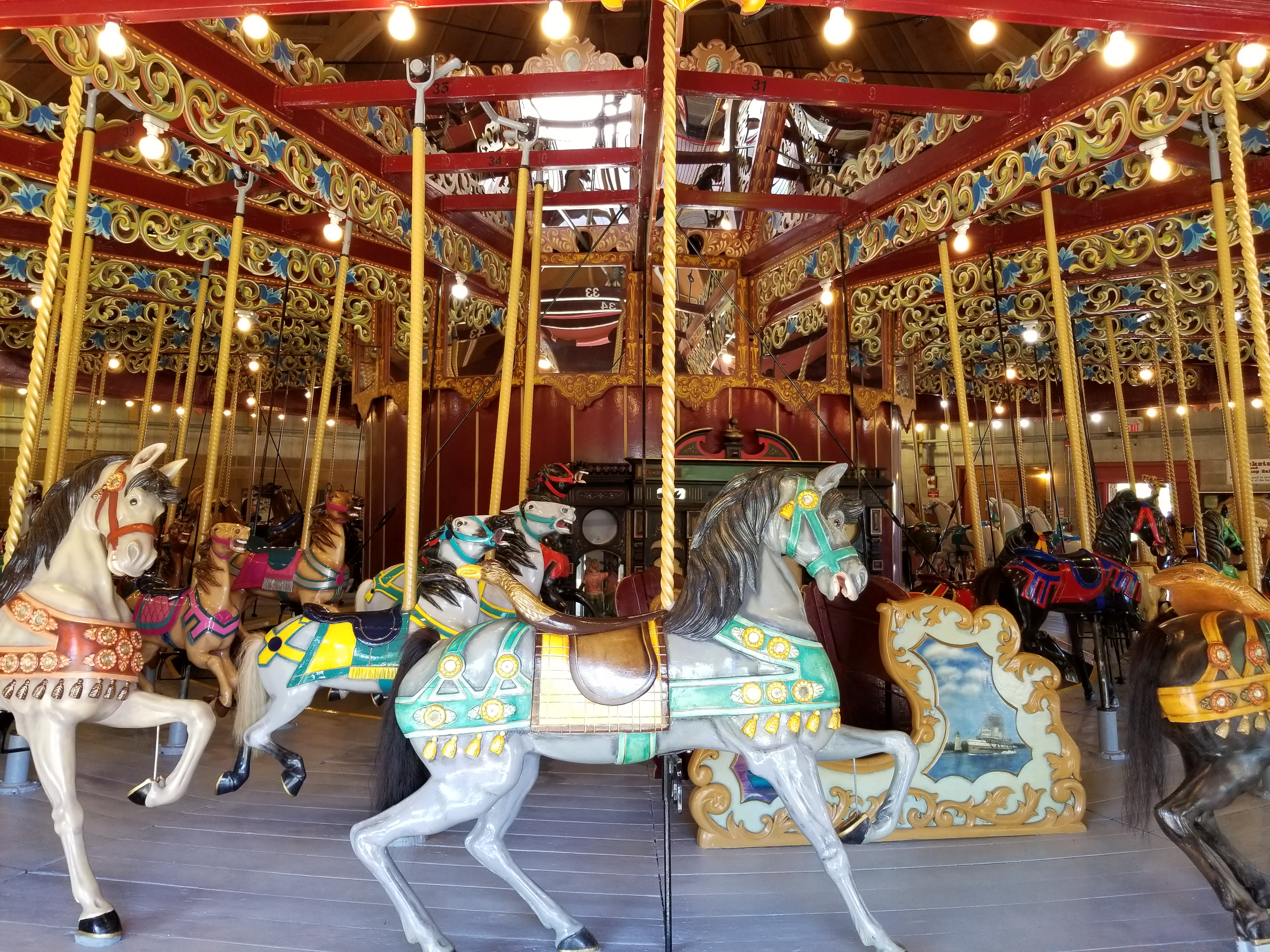
- Lakeside Park Carousel

Port Dalhousie, Ontario
- Coordinates: 43°12′12.852″N 79°15′58.536″W

Ride statistics
- Attraction type: Carousel
- Manufacturer: Charles I. D. Looff

The Lakeside Park Carousel is a historic carousel located in Port Dalhousie, Ontario, Canada, a community in the city of St. Catharines.

== History ==
The Lakeside Park Carousel was carved by Charles I.D. Looff between 1898 and 1905 in Brooklyn, New York. The animals were carved by Looff's factory workers, including Marcus Illions, who worked for Looff at the time. The carousel's rounding boards and scenery panels were built by George William Kremer, and are similar in appearance to those found on the Knoebels Grand Carousel, which is the only other Kremer carousel still in operation.

In 1921, the carousel was moved from its original location at Scarborough Beach Park in Scarborough, Ontario, to its first location in Port Dalhousie nearer Lake Ontario (on the beach!). At the time, Lakeside Park had 58 attractions. The Lakeside Park Carousel is the only remaining attraction at Lakeside Park, and is now owned by the city of St. Catharines. In early 1980s (i.e. 1982 - 1984), the carousel was fully dismantled and moved to its current location half way between the beach and parking at the West of the park. The city of St. Catharines acquired the carousel via a complex chain. It started with the original owner Sid Brookson who operated the other attractions at Lakeside park. In 1970, Dorothy Crabtree purchased the carousel from Sid Brookson and eventually transferred ownership to the City of St. Catharines with two clauses: the price of a ride will be 5 Cents forever and the Carousel must stay in Port Dalhousie.

== Description ==
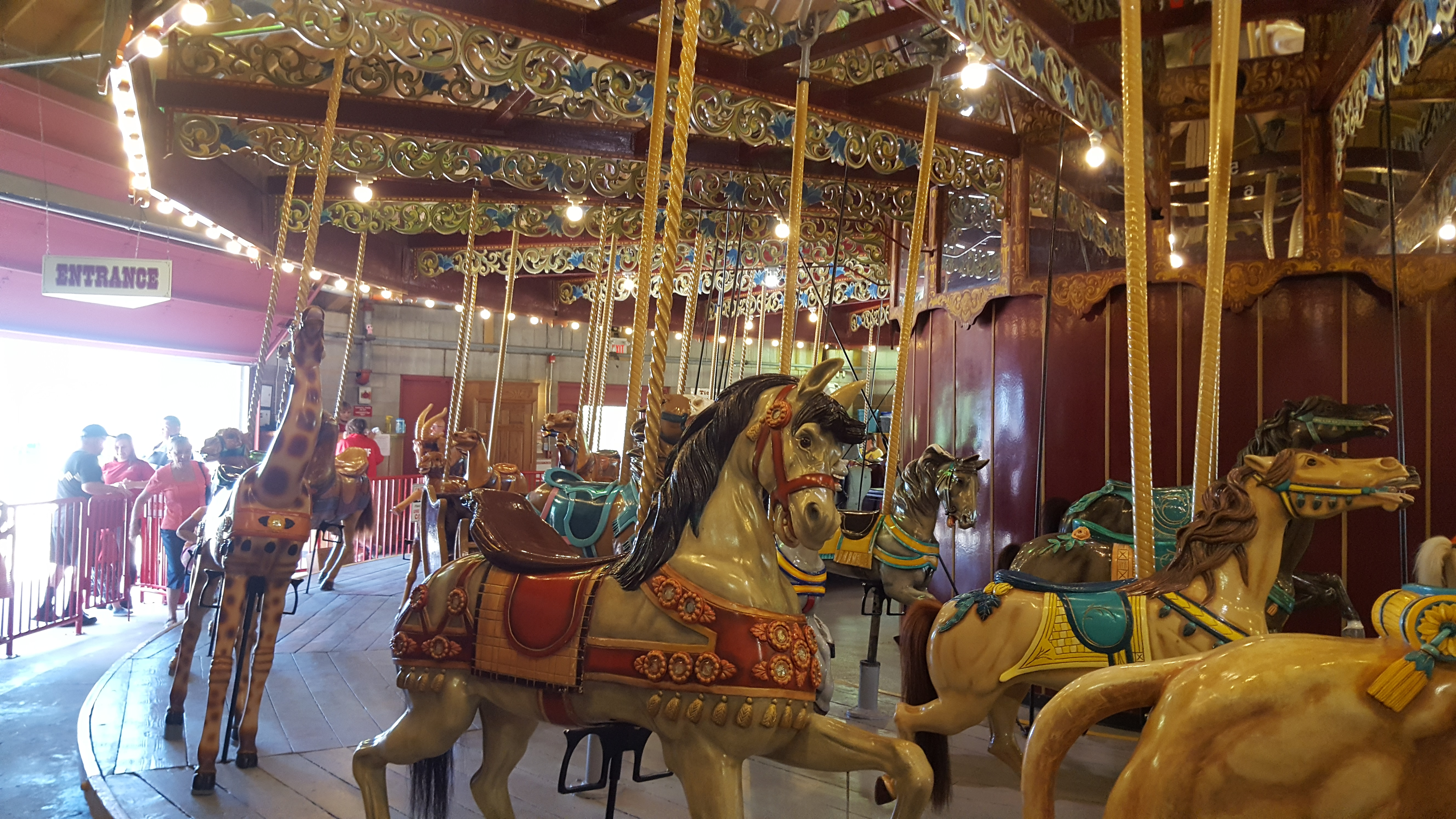
Various wooden animals on the Lakeside Park Carousel

The carousel has 68 hand-carved wooden animals, including horses, lions, camels, goats and giraffes. The carousel also has four chariots. The animals on the carousel still have real horsehair tails.

== Friends of the Lakeside Park Carousel ==
The Friends of the Lakeside Park Carousel are a group of dedicated volunteers who have carefully and fully restored the carousel, and continue to care for and maintain the carousel to keep it in perfect working order.

== Frati & Co. Band Organ ==
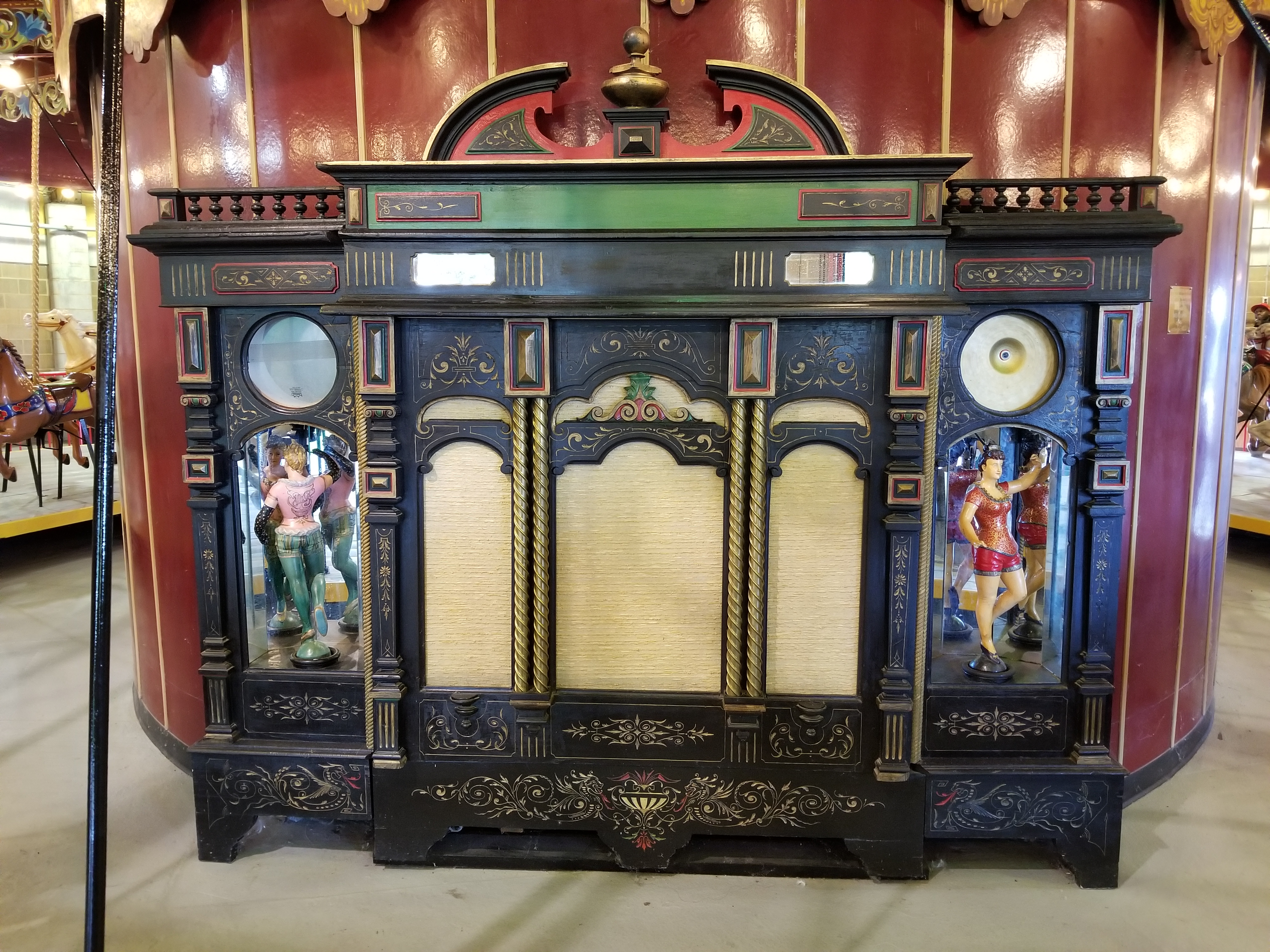
Frati & Co. band organ at the Lakeside Park Carousel

The Lakeside Park Carousel is home to a late 19th century band organ built by Frati & Co. of Berlin and sold by John Cocchi, and is located in the centre of the carousel. The organ was originally played by a pinned barrel, but was converted by Wurlitzer at some point between 1927 and the 1940s to their Wurlitzer 150 scale. The organ is equipped with automatic stops, percussion instruments (also known as "traps") and a duplex roll-frame, which allows for continuous music. When one roll is finished playing, the next one starts playing while the first one rewinds to begin again. Employees from the municipal government change the music rolls every two days.

On very hot and humid days, carousel employees usually opt to play recorded carousel music, due to the fact that the high temperature and humidity de-tune the organ.

The band organ was restored in 1985, and again in 2005, and is continuously maintained by the city of St. Catharines.
