= William F. Mangels Four-Row Carousel =

Historic carousel in Portland, Oregon, U.S.

- U.S. National Register of Historic Places
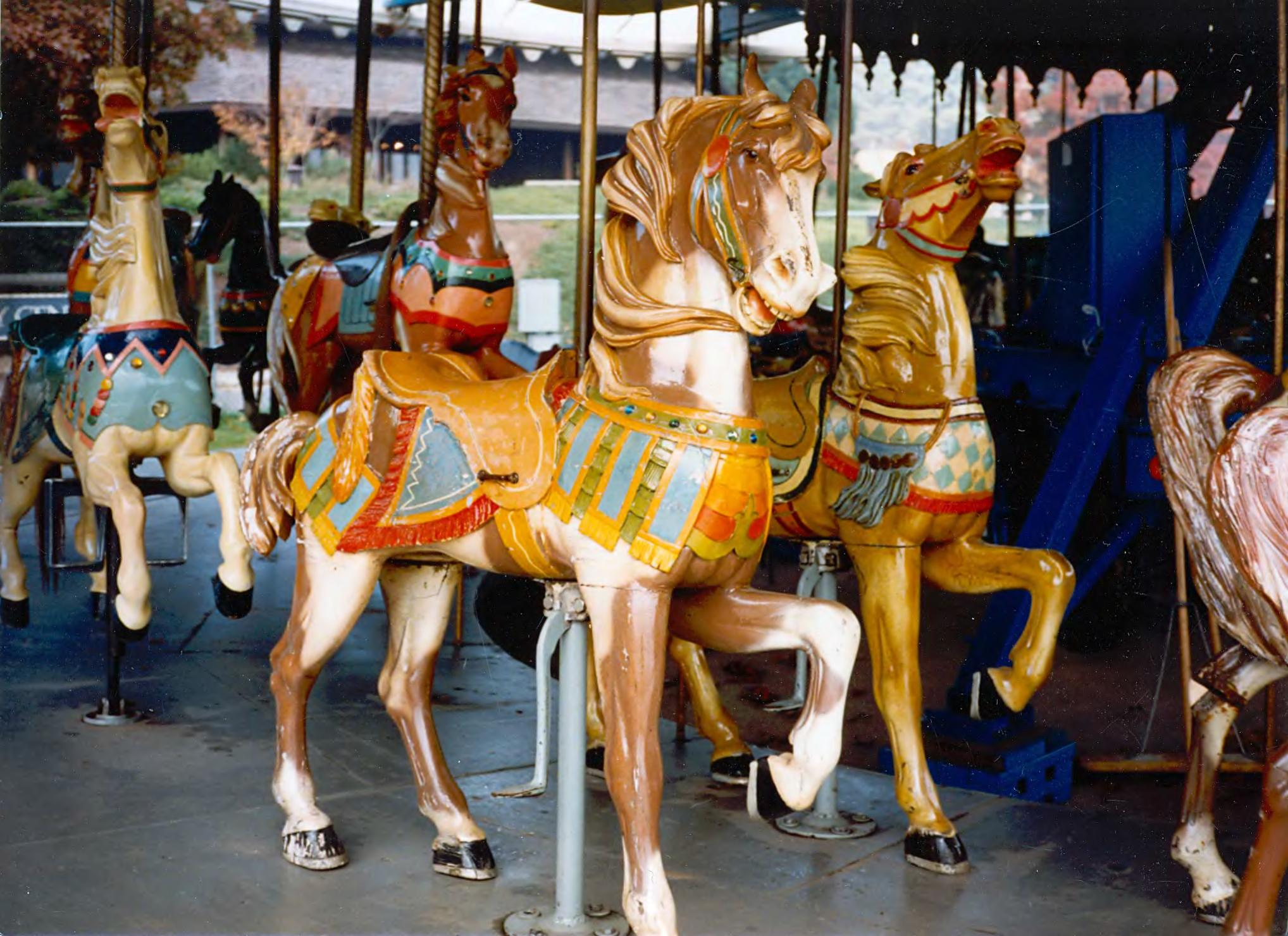
- The Mangels Carousel in Washington Park in 1987.

- Location within Portland, Oregon
- Location: 4033 Southwest Canyon Road; Portland, Oregon
- Coordinates: 45°30′38″N 122°43′05″W
- Area: less than one acre
- Built: 1914
- Architect: W. F. Mangels Co. Carousel Works, Marcus Charles Illions
- MPS: Oregon Historic Wooden Carousels TR
- NRHP reference No.: 87001383
- Added to NRHP: August 26, 1987

The William F. Mangels Four-Row Carousel, formerly located at the World Forestry Center in southwest Portland, Oregon, is listed on the National Register of Historic Places. It is owned by the Perron family.

== See also ==
- Amusement rides on the National Register of Historic Places
- National Register of Historic Places listings in Southwest Portland, Oregon
- William F. Mangels
