= Old Police Headquarters =

- City of San Diego Police Headquarters, Jails and Courts
- U.S. National Register of Historic Places
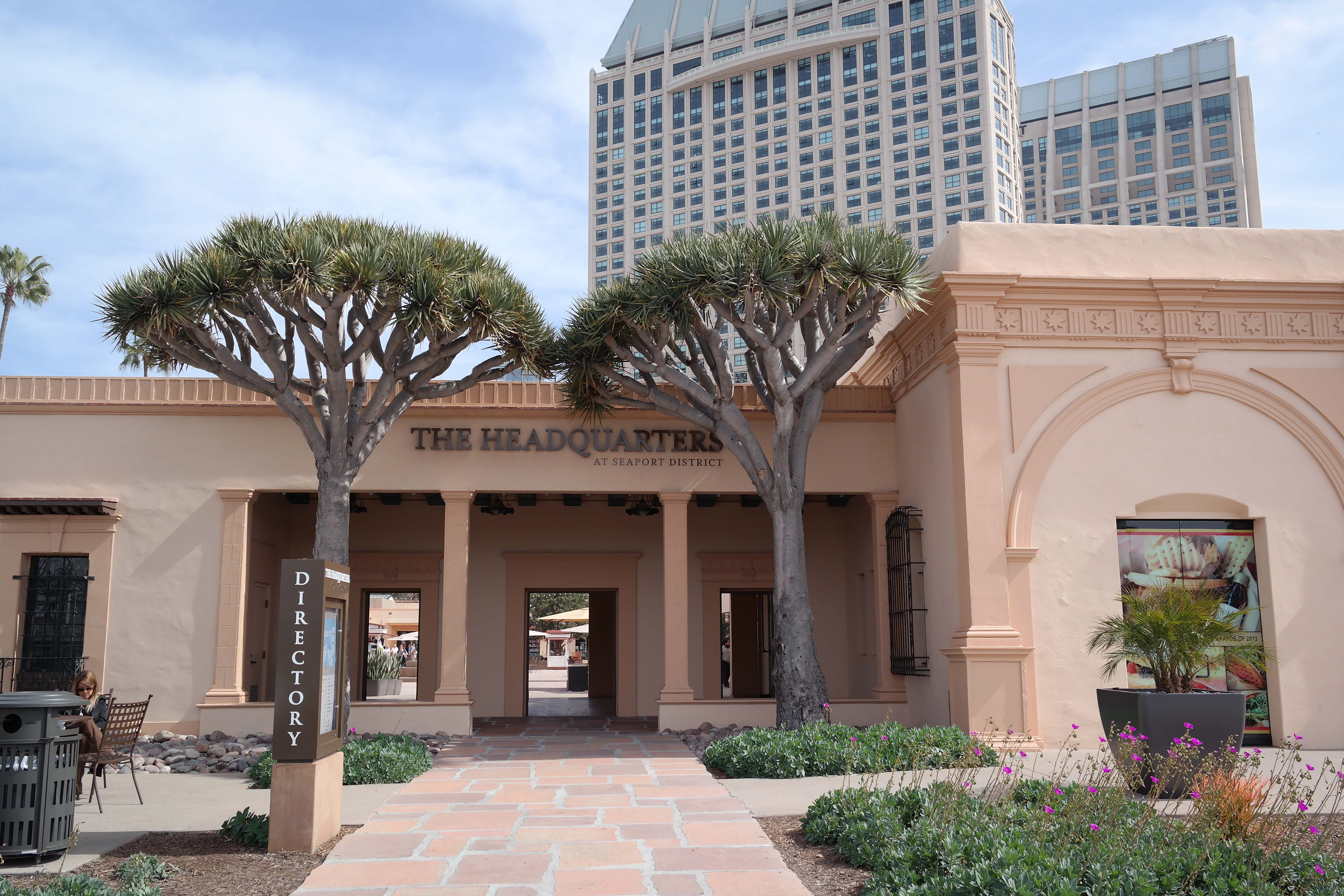

- Location within California
- Location: 801 W. Market St., San Diego, California
- Coordinates: 32°42′38″N 117°10′12″W
- Area: 4.2 acres (1.7 ha)
- Built: 1939
- Architect: Multiple
- Architectural style: Spanish Colonial Revival
- NRHP reference No.: 98000833
- Added to NRHP: July 9, 1998

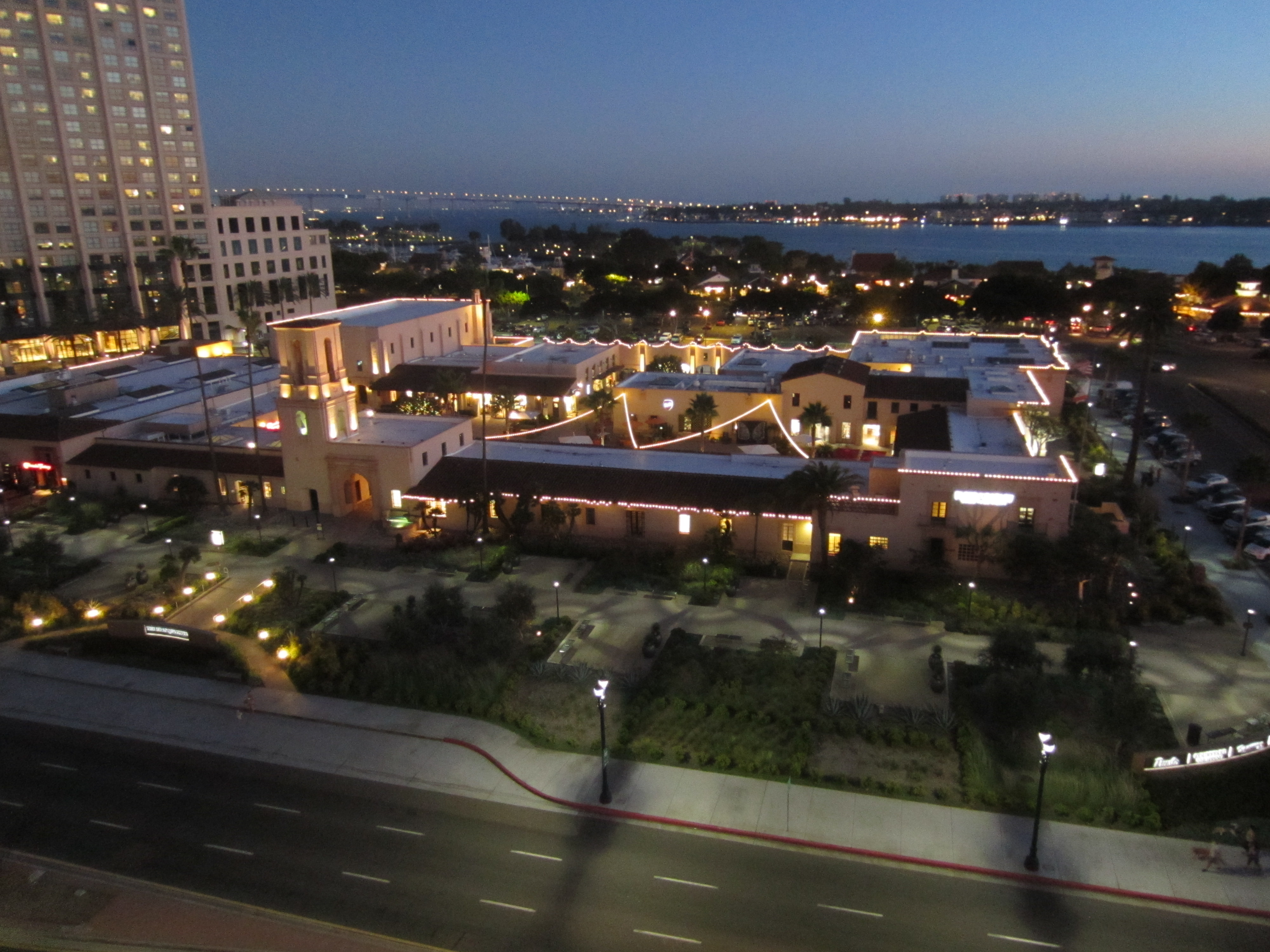
The complex at night, 2016

Old Police Headquarters is a historic building in San Diego, California. It was built in 1939 by Quayle. Charles & Edward (QuayleBros Treganza, Alberto Owen Golden, Morley (M.H.Golden Constr.) and served as the San Diego Police Department's headquarters until 1987. The renovated buildings are now known as "The Headquarters" at Seaport Village. The building has a concrete foundation with stucco walls and has a red clay tile roof. The building's areas of significance are Architecture, Law, Politics, and Government.

== Building Floor Plan ==
The San Diego Police Headquarters, Jail & Courts is an institutional complex of interconnected spaces arranged in a rectangle around an interior courtyard. Heights vary from single story to three stories with an accent tower reaching 68 feet. The complex is on a 4.2-acre site, that includes a front parking lot and an interior courtyard with a remnant ornamental landscape. The architectural style is expressed as Spanish Colonial Revival in variations ranging from Churrigueresque to Pueblo Deco. The complex is presented in five basic volume units that depart from one another in ornament and detail as well as in function but circulate within as a singular facility. The five units are; the Garage, the Assembly/Gymnasium area, the Courts, the Jail, and the front administrative public area with its arched entry and signature tower. Each unit is unique enough to stand alone, yet, as a composite create a highly distinct complex. All foundations, floors and walls are reinforced concrete construction. All exterior ornament is precast concrete. Exterior finishes are rough trowel stucco and finished plaster. Roof treatments are Mission style red tile or composition shingles. Interior historic courtyard elements, fountain, seating and the main planter bed have been removed, however, the ornamental paving is in very good condition. The horticultural element has been compromised due to discontinued irrigation. Minor modifications were made to the exterior and interior over a 48-year period of occupation, however, since the site had only one user, the San Diego Police Headquarters, the entire property has remained very much intact.

== See also ==
- National Register of Historic Places listings in San Diego County, California
