= Heilbronner Block =

- U.S. National Register of Historic Places
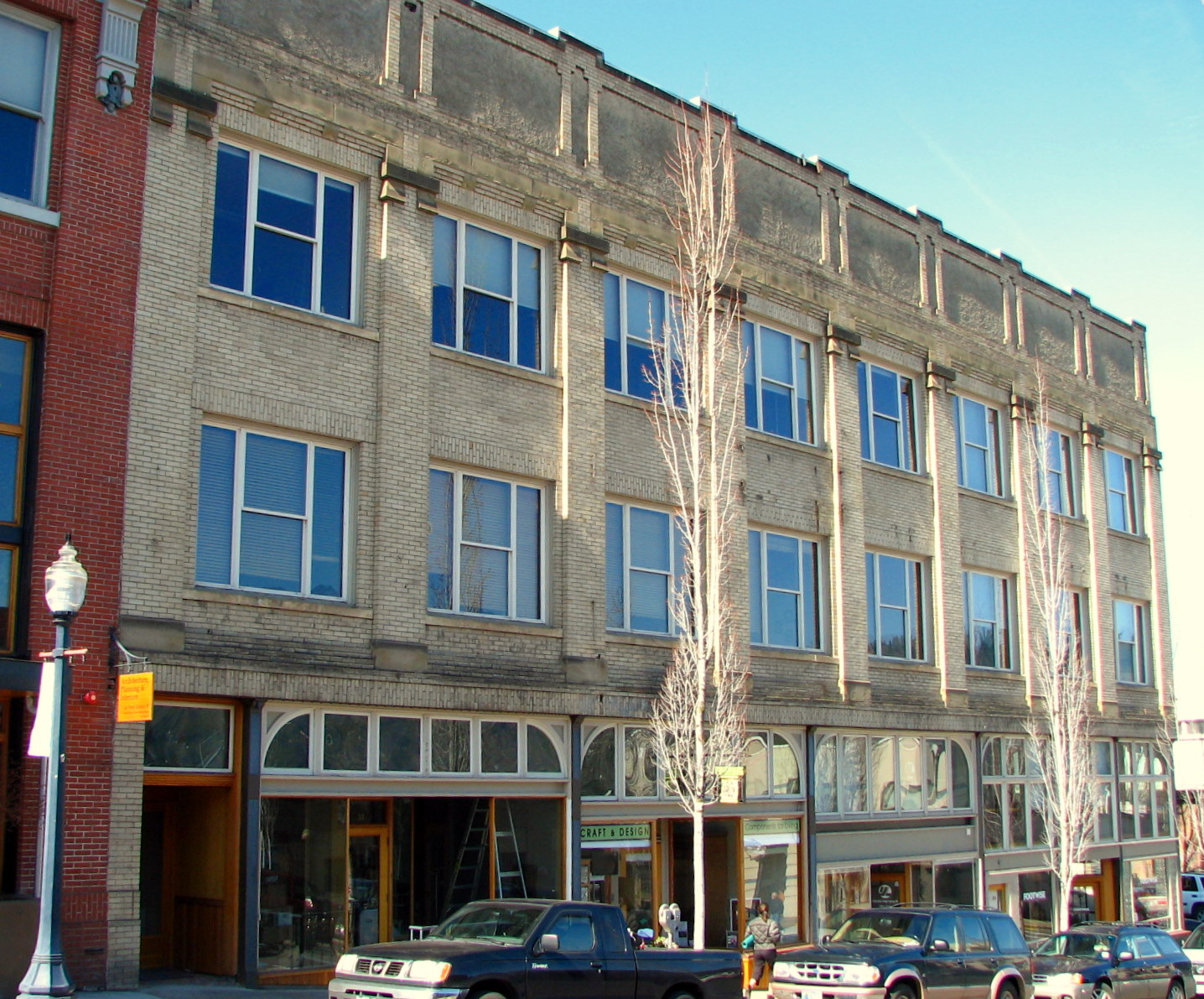
- The Heilbronner Block in 2009

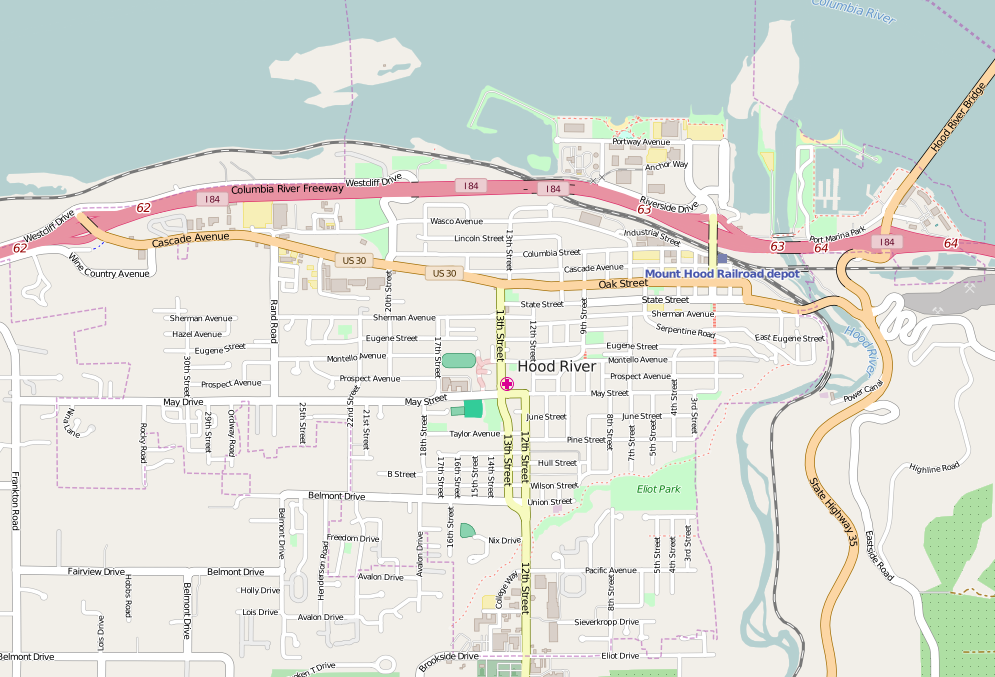
- Location within Hood River OR Location within Oregon Location within the United States
- Location: 100–118 3rd Street; Hood River, Oregon
- Coordinates: 45°42′34″N 121°30′49″W
- Area: 5,000 square feet (460 m^{2}) (lot)
- Built: 1910
- Built by: Louis Daniel Boyed
- Architect: Robert R. Bartlett
- Architectural style: Chicago school
- NRHP reference No.: 05001554
- Added to NRHP: January 26, 2006

The Heilbronner Block is a historic commercial building located in downtown Hood River, Oregon, United States. The building was listed on the National Register of Historic Places 2006. The building, along with the First National Bank of Hood River building next door (also listed on the NRHP), are owned by the Perron family.

== See also ==
- National Register of Historic Places listings in Hood River County, Oregon
