= Woodbine Mall =

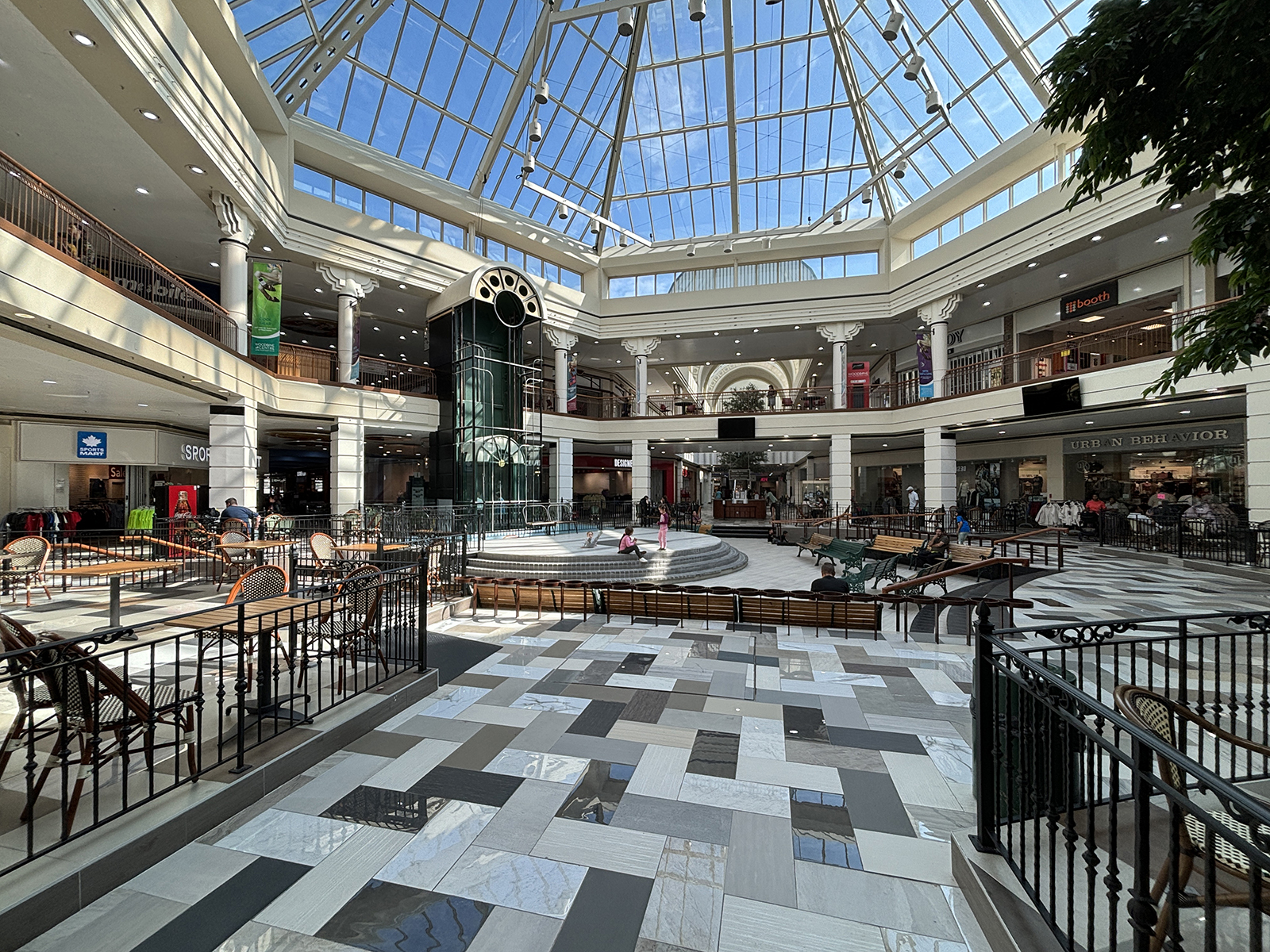
- Woodbine Centre atrium in 2023
- Location: Toronto, Ontario, Canada
- Coordinates: 43°43′13″N 79°36′01″W
- Address: 500 Rexdale Boulevard; Toronto, Ontario; M9W 6K5
- Opened: 1985; 41 years ago
- Developer: Cadillac Fairview Corporation
- Manager: Woodbine Mall Holdings
- Owner: Romspen Investment Corporation
- Architect: Crang and Boake Incorporated
- Num. of stores: 107
- Num. of anchor tenants: 2
- Floor area: 750,000 sq ft (69,677 m^{2})
- Floors: 2
- Website: Woodbine Mall

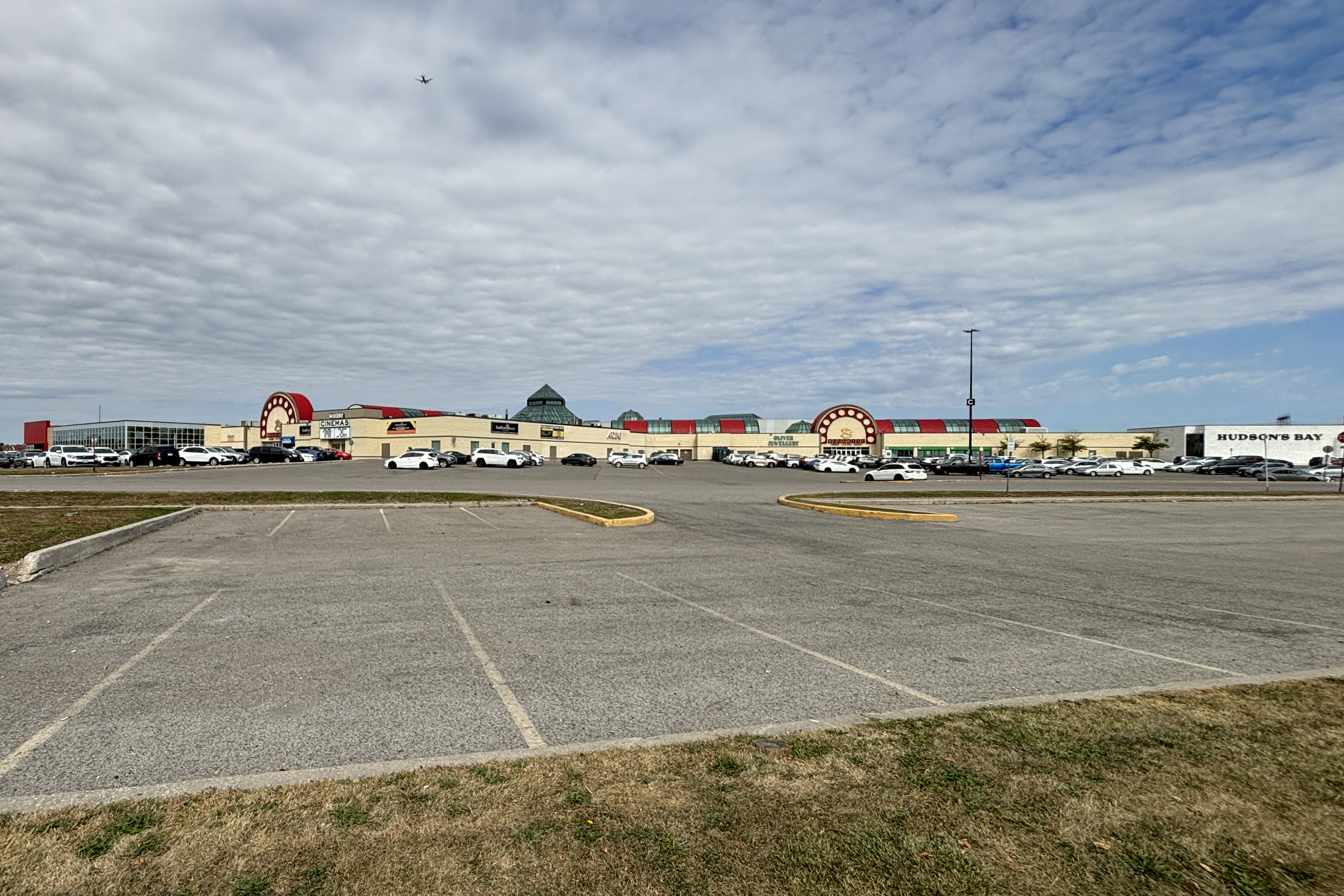
Exterior of the mall

Woodbine Mall & Fantasy Fair is a shopping mall in Toronto, Ontario, Canada. It is located at Rexdale Boulevard and Highway 27 in the Rexdale area of Toronto, across Rexdale Boulevard from Woodbine Racetrack. The mall has over 130 stores and is home to Fantasy Fair, a year-round indoor amusement park. The fair houses a Charles I. D. Looff carousel. It is one of 13 still in operation today. They also have a 50-foot ferris wheel which they say is the only one in North America. The ferris wheel was closed in April 2024.

== History ==
Woodbine Centre was opened in 1985 by developer Cadillac Fairview, Its design served as inspiration for property developer Sir John Hall when planning the MetroCentre, formerly the UK's largest shopping mall, in the 1980s. CF sold Woodbine Centre in 2005 to a numbered company.

In 2008, proposed development of an entertainment centre at Woodbine Racetrack and the closure of national stores like Shoppers Drug Mart fuelled rumours that the mall was closing. Instead, then-owners Darton Property planned renovations, starting with redesigned washrooms.

As of 2016, the assessed value of the property was $96,708,000. Woodbine Mall Holdings Inc. owed over a half-million in unpaid taxes that year.

On May 2, 2023, Woodbine Mall Holdings Inc. was placed in receivership by Romspen Investment Corporation. Ernst & Young was appointed receiver.

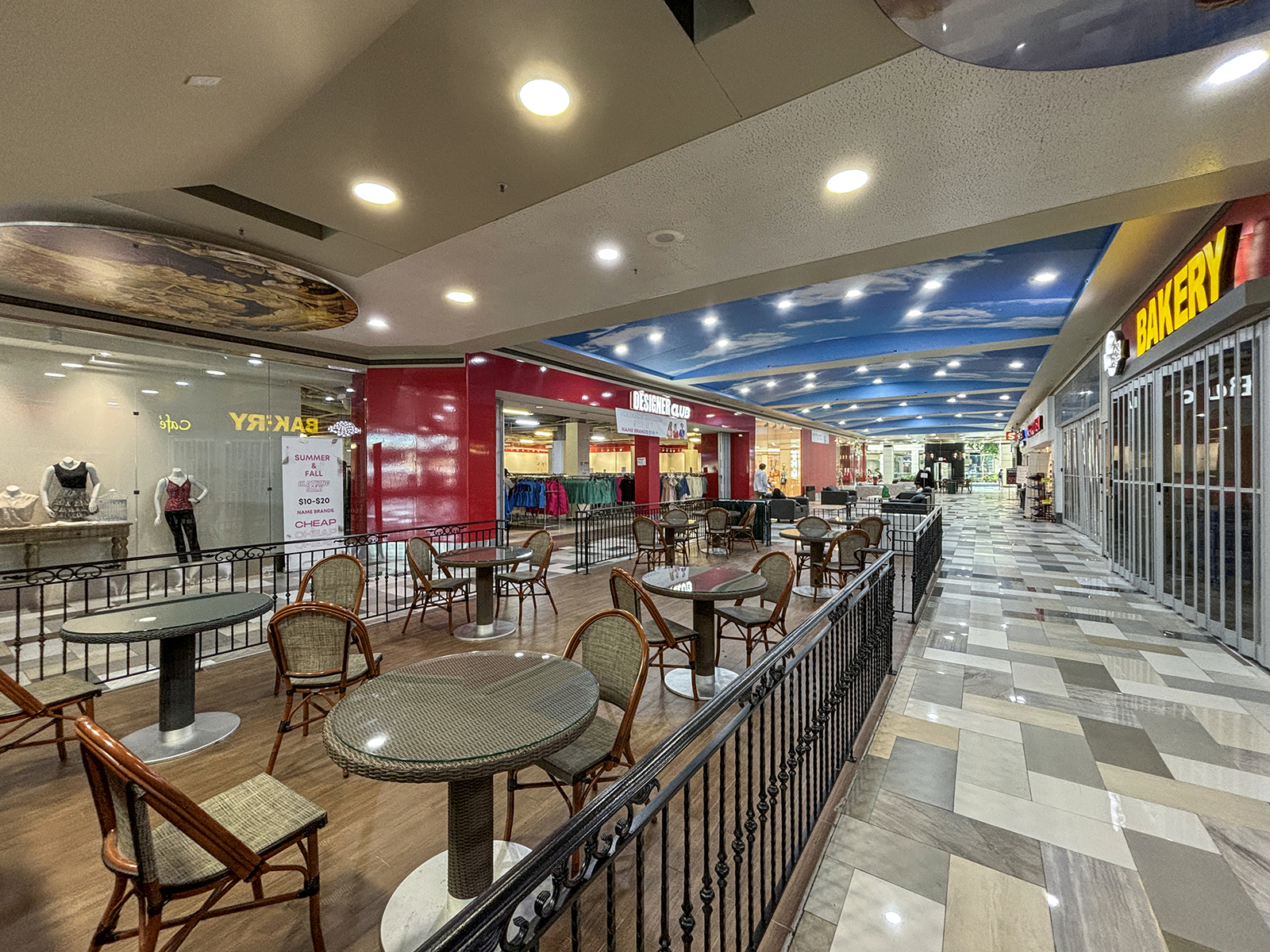
Level 1 Shops

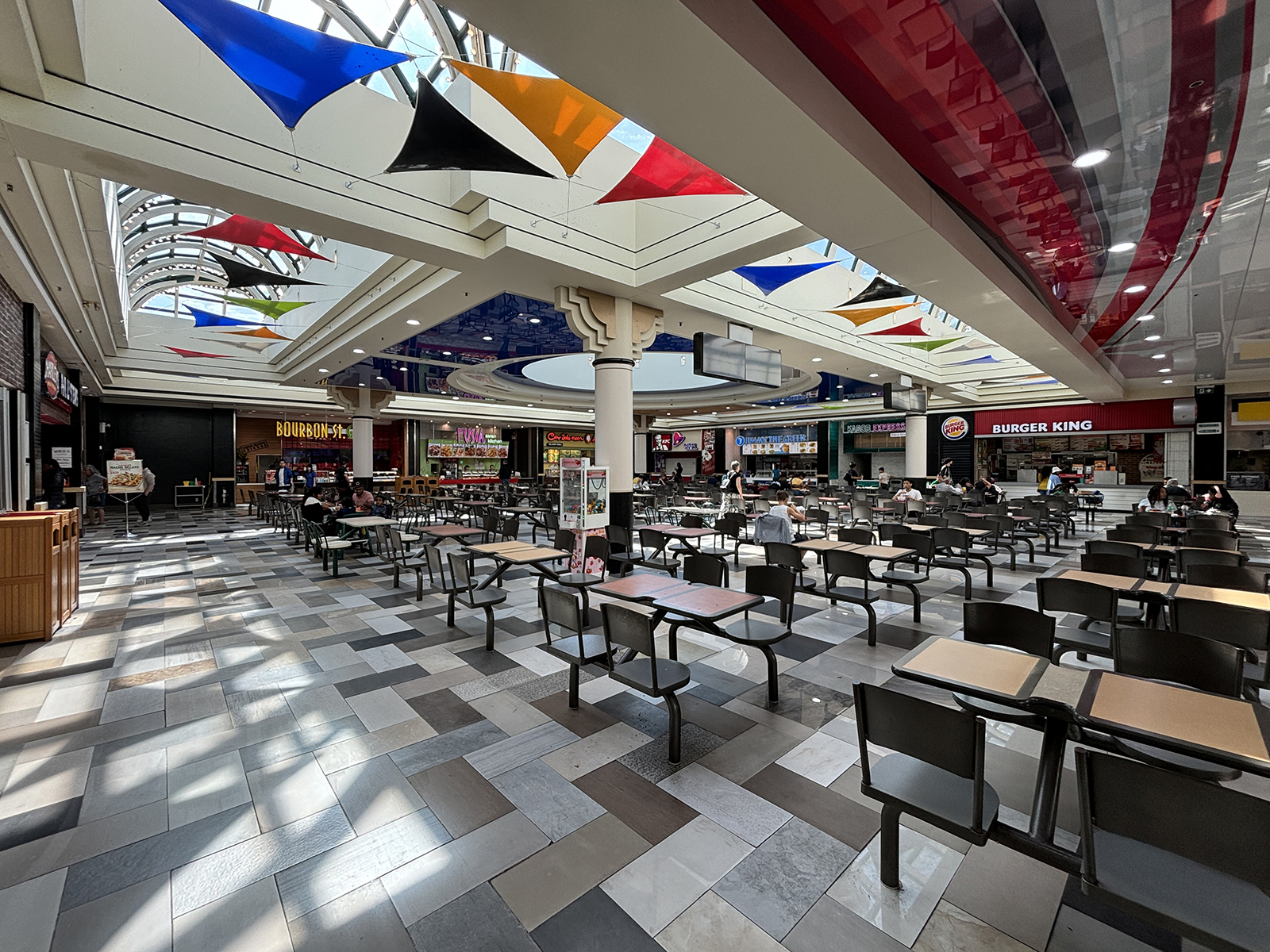
Level 2 Food Court

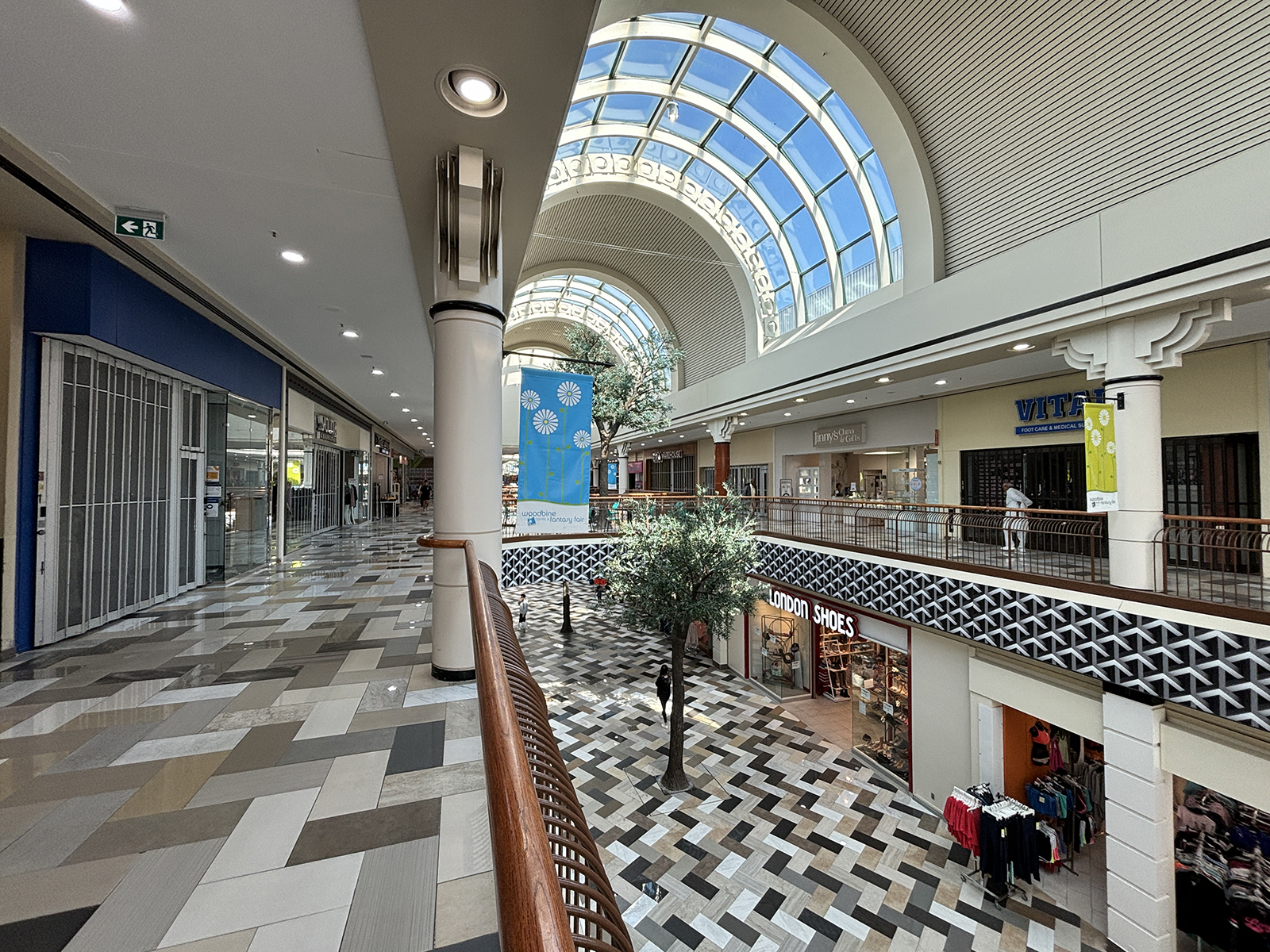
Skylight in the mall

== Fantasy Fair Amusement Park ==
Fantasy Fair
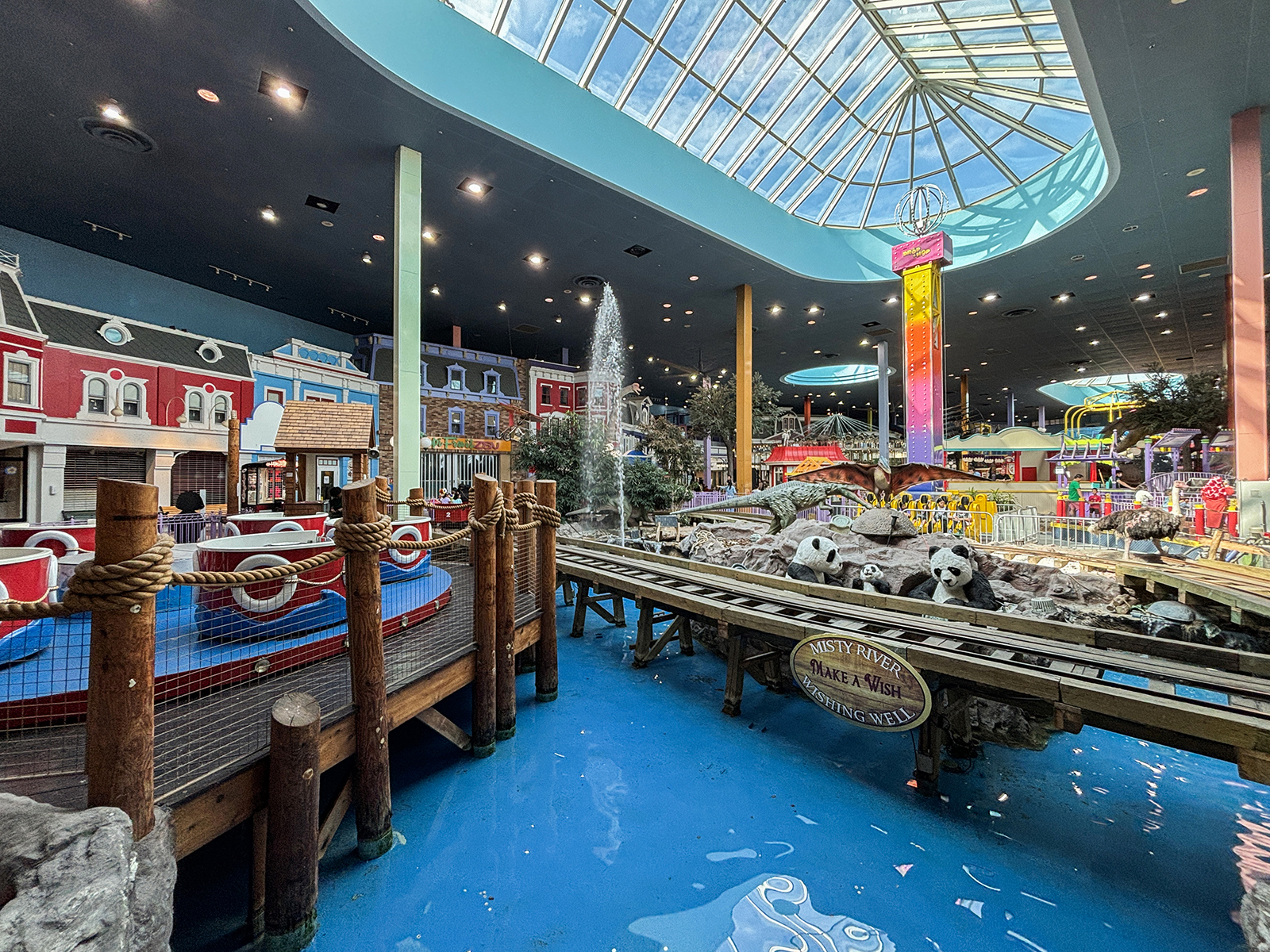
- Fantasy Fair in 2023
- Interactive map of Fantasy Fair
- Location: Toronto, Ontario Canada
- Opened: 1985

Attractions
- Total: 9

Fantasy Fair is an indoor amusement park and the largest in Ontario featuring nine full-sized rides:

- 1911 Antique Looff Carousel
- Crystal Kaleidoscope – indoor ferris wheel (CLOSED)
- Ships Ahoy – spinning tea cups
- Smash 'n Dash – bumper cars
- Fantasy Flight – a 32' balloon tower ride (CLOSED)
- JRB Express Train – mini replica steam engine
- Airforce - plane ride
- Spinners – roller coaster (CLOSED)
- XD Simulator Theatre
- Rock 'n Climb - climbing wall
- Drop & Hop - tower (CLOSED)
- Dreamer's Play Village - indoor playground/soft play area (5500 sq.ft)
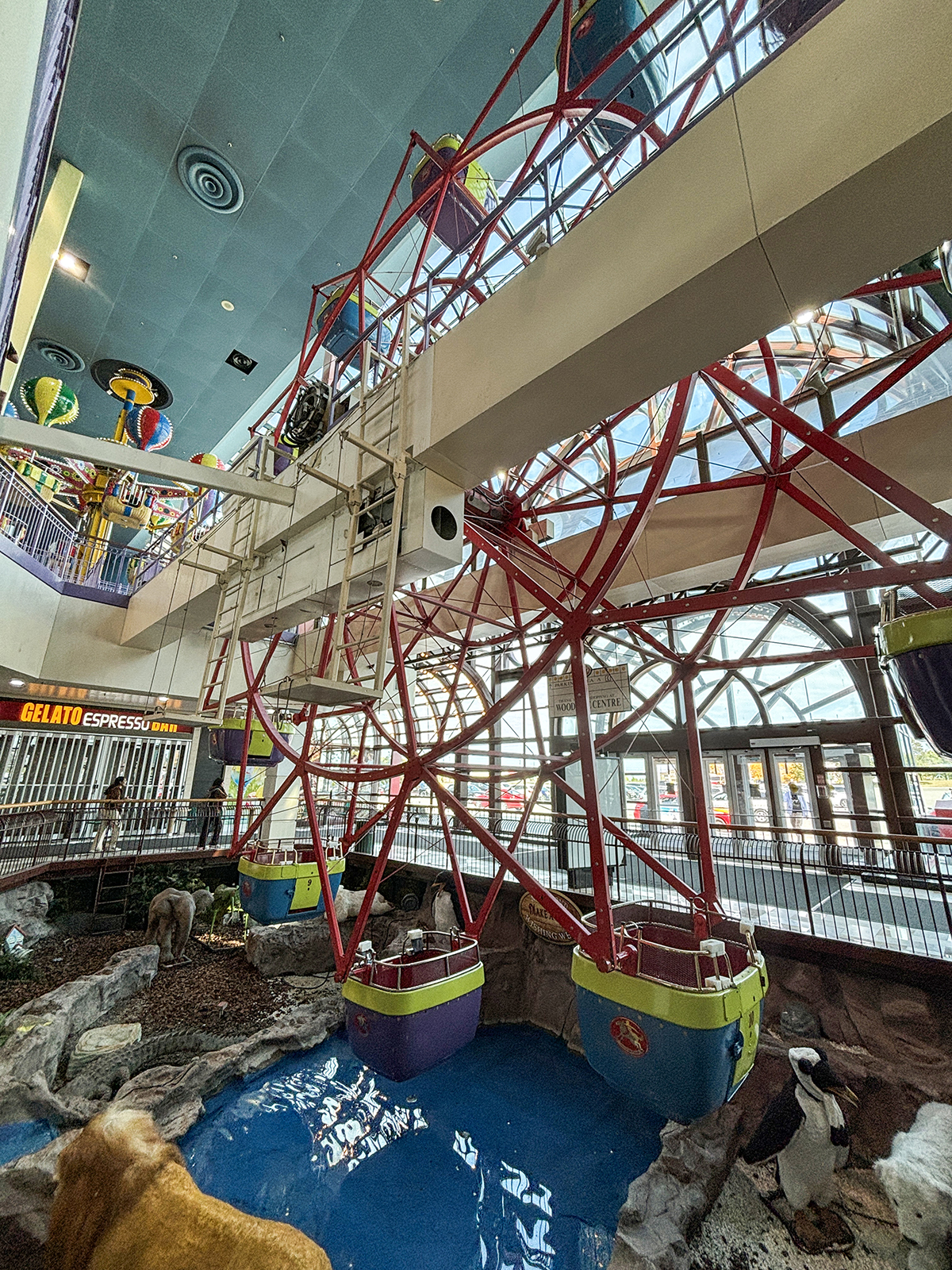
Crystal Kaleidoscope – indoor Ferris Wheel

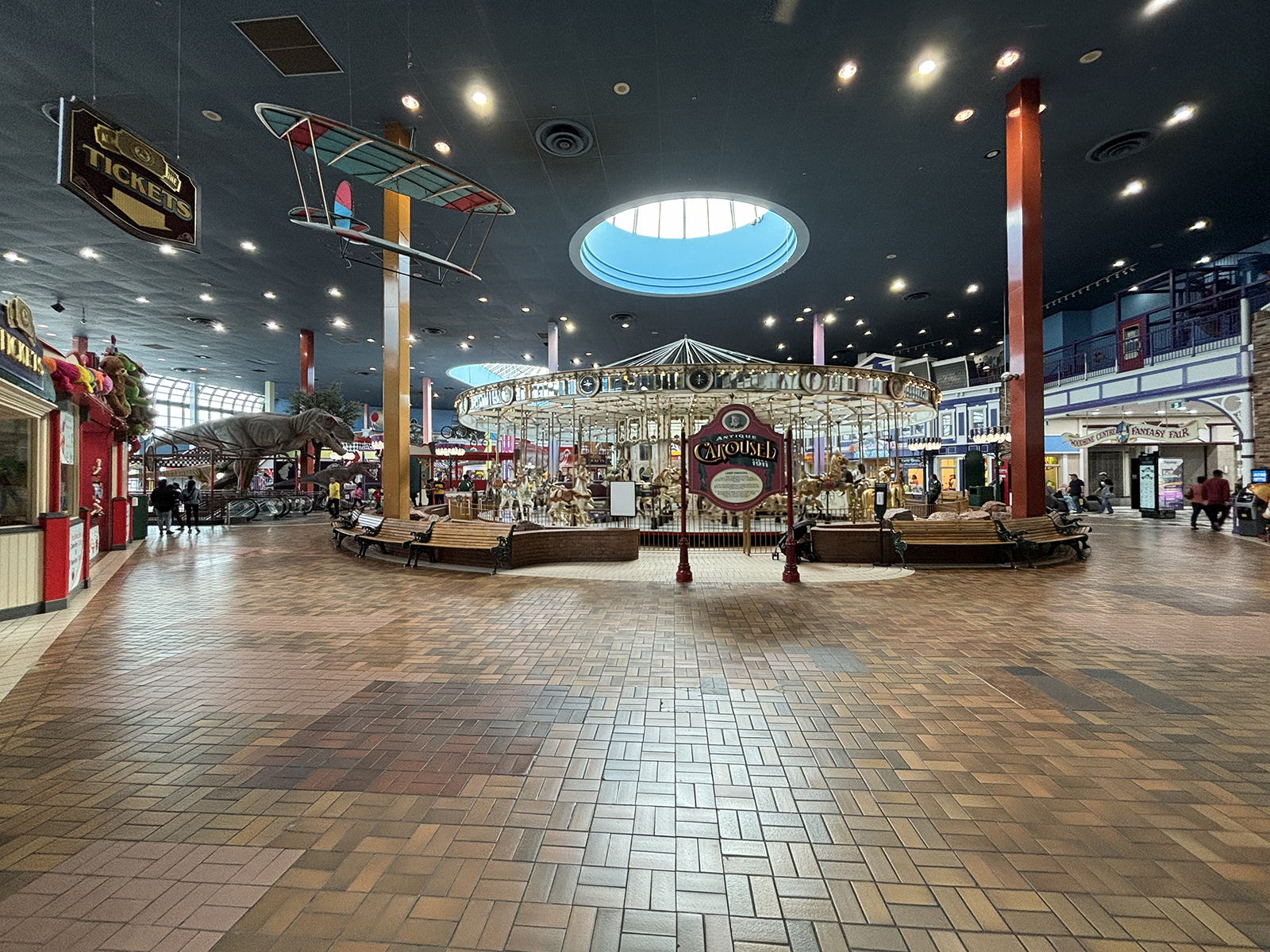
Merry Go Round

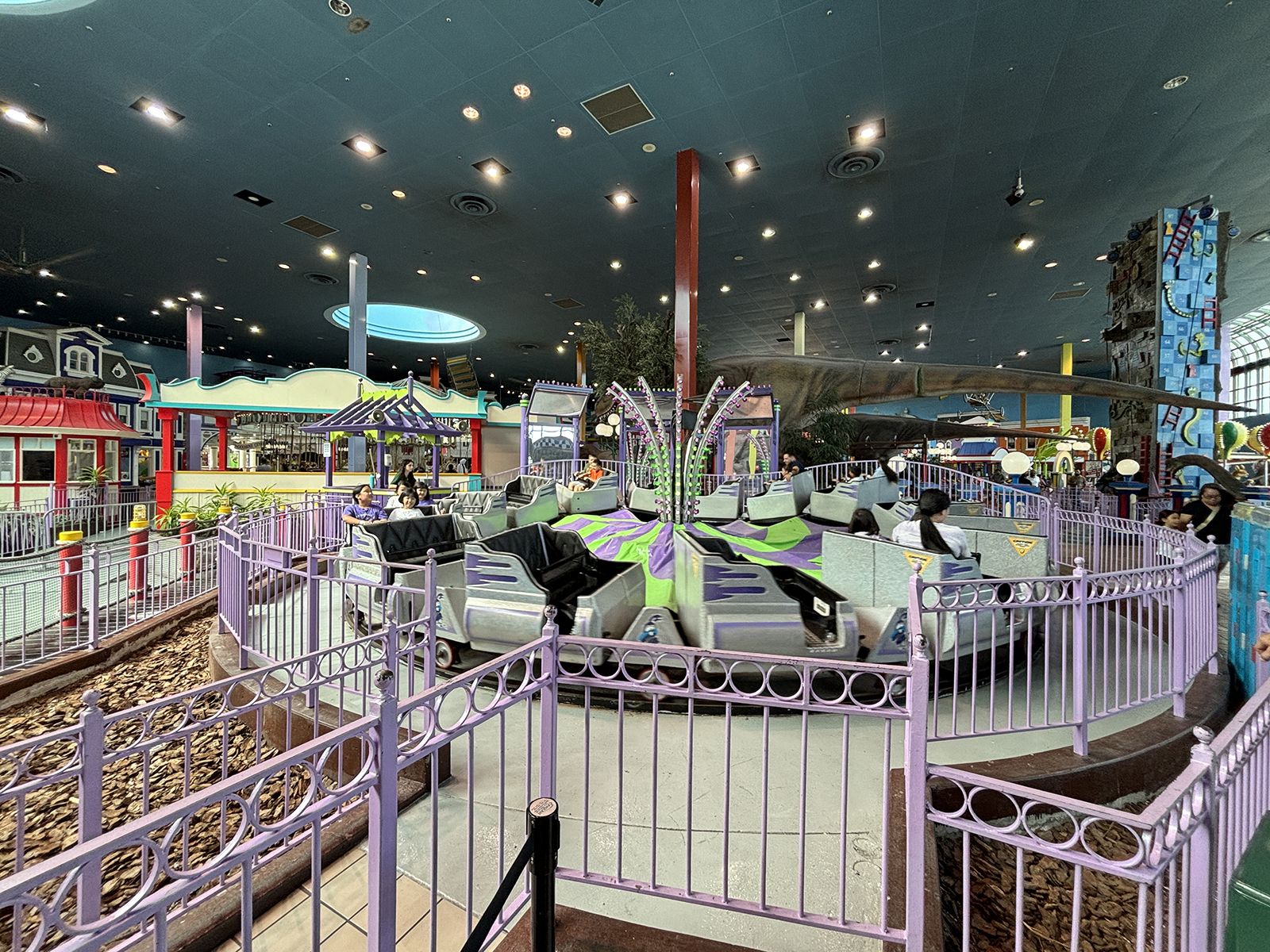
Ships Ahoy – spinning tea cups

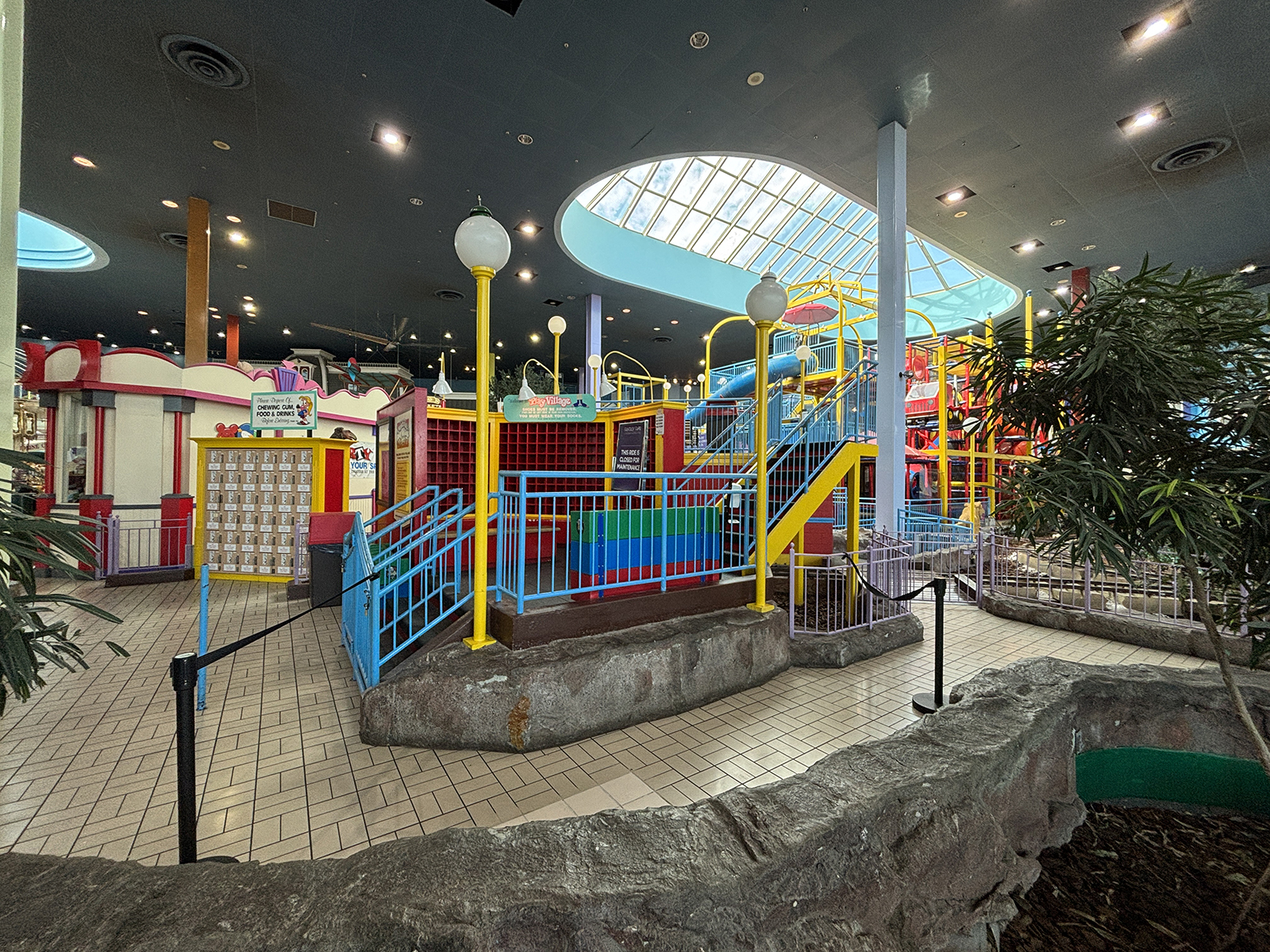
Play Village (indoor playground)

== In popular culture ==
The mall was featured in the filming of Police Academy 4: Citizens on Patrol, where David Spade is seen skateboarding through the mall and the Animorphs TV series (in a second season episode called "Changes, Part 2").

Various parts of the mall and Fantasy Fair were also featured in Shazam!, What We Do in the Shadows (season 5, episode 1), and filling in as the Mall of America in 8-Bit Christmas.

Former Canadian pop/dance trio, Brattt Pack, shot the music video for their notable 2000 radio hit "Carousel" at the mall.
