= International Market World =

- Location: Auburndale, Florida, United States
- Coordinates: 28.0574°N 81.8279°W
- Opened: 1981
- Owner: International Market World
- Num. of stores: More than 1,200 vendors
- Floor area: Approximately 255,000 sq ft (23,700 m^{2})
- Floors: 1
- Parking: Dirt lots on east, south and west sides ~ Free
- Website: www.intlmarketworld.com

International Market World is a very large flea market located just west of Auburndale, Florida, United States. The flea market is on the north side of U.S. Highway 92. Just to its southwest is the intersection of US 92 and Polk Parkway (State Road 570). International Market World is open every Friday, Saturday and Sunday throughout the year and is the largest one in Polk County, Florida, and it is also one of the largest in central Florida.

This flea market features many vendors selling a variety of new and used items. Numerous food concessions offer a variety of foods to eat. A large section is devoted to numerous produce vendors. International Market World also offers some entertainment. At times, musicians perform and there are sometimes alligator and other animal shows. The Florida State Championship Bluegrass and Clogging Festival is always held at the flea market the third weekend in March.
