= International Museum of Carousel Art =

- Hood River, Oregon
- Established: 1983; 43 years ago
- Dissolved: 2007; 19 years ago
- Location: Portland, Oregon (1983–1999); Hood River, Oregon (1999–2007)
- Coordinates: 45°42′32″N 121°30′49″W

The International Museum of Carousel Art (IMCA) was a museum in Hood River, Oregon, focused on carousels. The museum claimed to be the largest such collection in the world and had 8,000 to 10,000 visitors per year.

The IMCA was founded in 1983 as the Portland Carousel Museum, a non-profit organization, after the founders, Duane and Carol Perron, helped restore a 1914 carousel in the late 1970s. The museum's location was later moved to Hood River and opened on October 17, 1999; it attracted about three thousand visitors in its first year. The collection contained about 110 carved animals, an operational Wurlitzer band organ, chariots, and other artifacts. The exhibits featured European animals, major American carvers, armored horses, and the carousel animal restoration process.

Around 2007, due to the city informing the Perrons that their carousel restoration work could no longer take place at the museum and would need to be moved to an industrial area, the IMCA closed. After the closure, plans were in place to create a much larger museum facility for the collection south of Hood River in Dee, Oregon, but due to the denial of a permit, those plans never came to fruition. The museum's former displays are in storage in a warehouse in Dee as of 2024.
