= Seaport Village =

Waterfront shopping complex in San Diego

Coordinates: 32°42′32.43″N 117°10′15.97″W

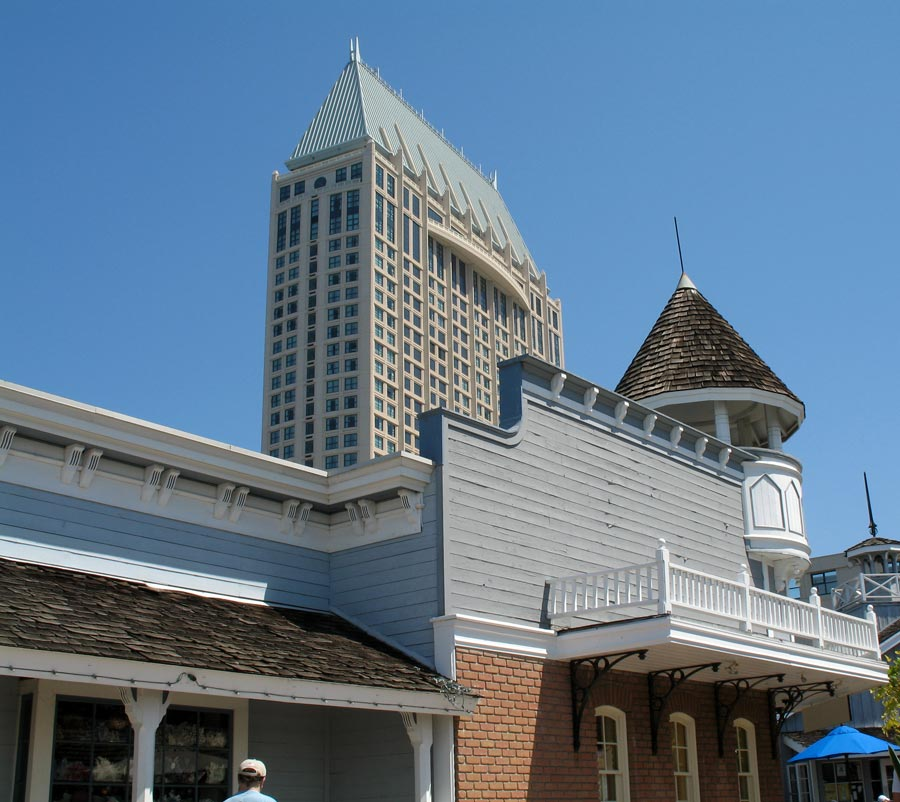
A storefront in Seaport Village, with a downtown hotel in the background

Seaport Village is a waterfront shopping and dining complex adjacent to San Diego Bay in downtown San Diego, California. The complex houses more than 70 shops, galleries, and eateries on 90,000 square feet (8,000 m^{2}) of waterfront property. It contains several freestanding buildings in an assortment of architectural styles, from Victorian to traditional Mexican.

Designed to be a car-free environment, the complex features four miles (6 km) of winding paths, rather than streets connecting the various buildings. It is located in walking distance from the San Diego Convention Center and the cruise ship terminal.

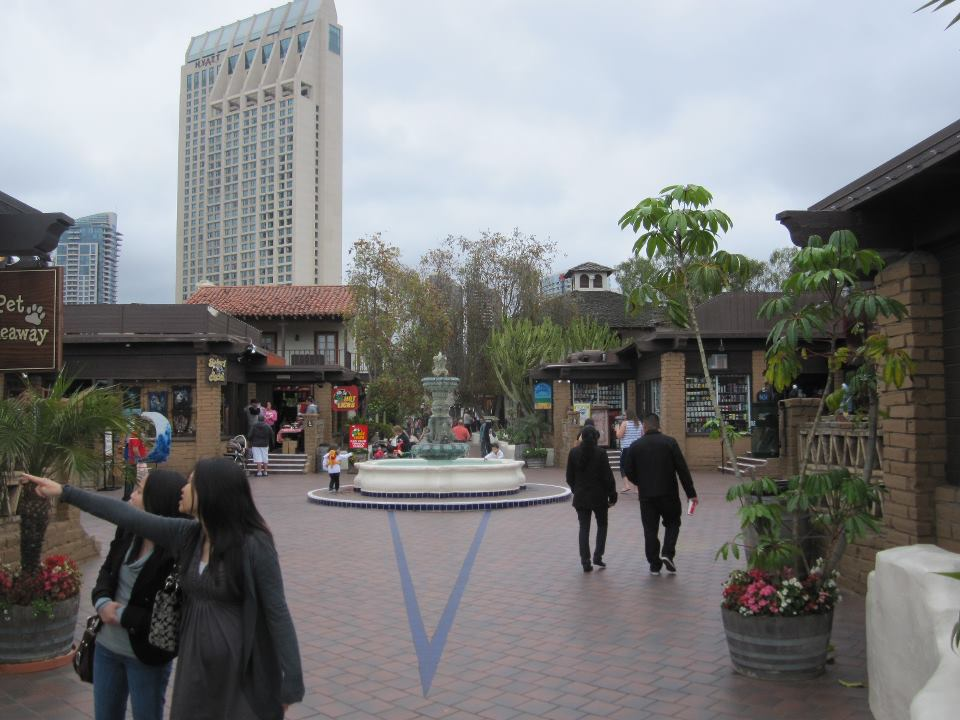
Seaport Village

== History ==
Seaport Village was built on landfill over Punta de los Muertos (Spanish for Point of the Dead), where the Spanish expedition of 1782 buried those who had died of scurvy. In later years it was a railroad yard where goods and other materials used to come through the area. It is the ending point of U.S. Route 80.

Seaport Village was developed by Bryant Morris. The center broke ground in 1978 and opened in 1980. It is owned by the Port of San Diego and is under the management of Protea Management Properties.

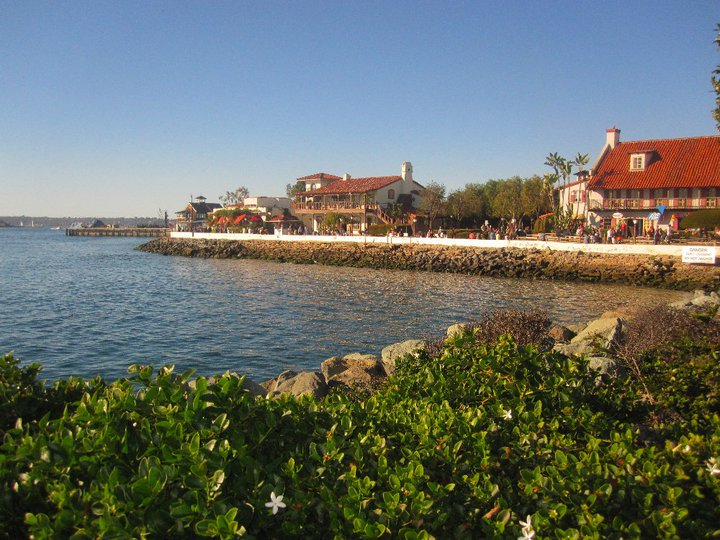
Seaport Village

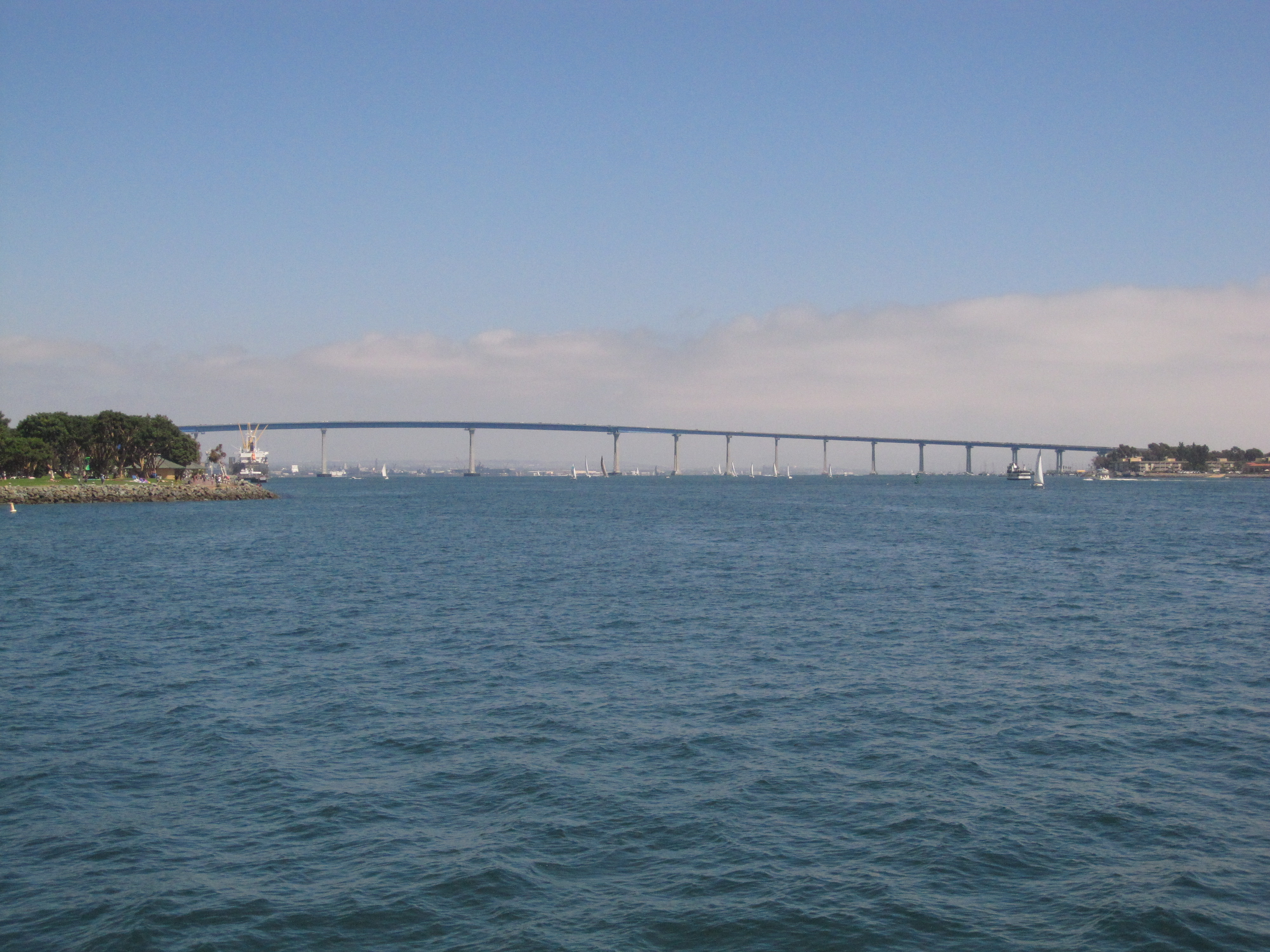
View of San Diego Bay and Coronado Bridge from Seaport Village

== Shops ==
More than 50 shops line the walkways. The shops are geared toward tourists, with merchandise ranging from cruise-ware and San Diego souvenirs to specialty vendors.

== Restaurants ==
Seaport Village is home to several bay-view restaurants. In addition, a food court and many snack stands are available. There is also a cafe aboard the adjacent, unrelated USS Midway Museum.

== Carousel ==
The center features a working carousel with hand-carved animals, the Seaport Village Carousel, built in 1895. It replaces a slightly smaller original carousel, which was sold in 2004 by the trust that owned it.

== See also ==
- Old Police Headquarters
