= List of Oregon's Most Endangered Places =

Oregon's Most Endangered Places is a list established in 2011, compiled by the American historic preservation non-profit Restore Oregon (formerly the Historic Preservation League of Oregon), that raises awareness of Oregon's "historic treasures in need of the advocacy and support to save them from demise".

Beginning in 2015, new sites were listed while some previously listed sites remained on the list. After 2020, Restore Oregon did not compile a yearly list. Many of the sites are also listed on the National Register of Historic Places (NRHP).

== Listings ==
The League's first list of endangered places was released in 2011 and included ten sites.

Year	Site	Location	NRHP	Image	Ref.	Fate	Notes
2011	Baker City Middle School	Baker City				Gutted by fire in May 2024. Demolished in July 2024.	
2011	Civic Stadium	Eugene	Yes (delisted)			Destroyed by fire in 2015.	
2011	Dr. Pierce's Barn	Cottage Grove	Yes			Demolished in 2012.	Part of the NRHP-listed Cochran-Rice Farm Complex.
2011	Egyptian Theatre	Coos Bay	Yes			Restored; Won DeMuro Award in 2016.	
2011	Francis Ermatinger House	Oregon City	Yes			Restored.	
2011	Josiah Burnett House aka The Lucy House	Eagle Creek				Restored.	Now part of the Philip Foster Farm complex (not part of the original NRHP nomination)
2011	Kirk Whited Farmstead	Redmond	Being considered				Listed due to annexation into the city. House made of lava field stones.
2011	Petersen Rock Garden	Redmond	Yes			Under restoration.	Listed on the NRHP in 2013.
2011	Tillamook Bay Lifesaving Station	Barview	Determined eligible in 2015				
2011	Watson-Price Barn	Philomath	Yes				1848 barn documented in the HABS. Part of the Watson-Price Farmstead.
2012	Ice House	Eagle Point	Yes			Threatened with demolition in 2023.	Now part of the Butte Creek Mill complex (listed in 2018)
2012	Jantzen Beach Carousel	Portland	Delisted in 2008			In storage since 2012. Relocated in 2023 to the National Neon Sign Museum in The Dalles. Being restored for a planned 2028 unveiling.	Relisted for 2016, 2017, 2018, 2019, and 2020
2012	Rivoli Theater	Pendleton	Yes			Under restoration.	Relisted for 2016. Part of the South Main Street Commercial Historic District.
2012	Rosemont Farm Smokehouse	Yamhill				Restoration began in 2013.	
2012	Skidmore/Old Town Historic District	Portland	Yes			Various restoration projects, including historically compatible infill (230 Ash–DeMuro Award 2020: PAE Building–DeMuro Award 2022).	Also a National Historic Landmark District.
2012	St. Francis Hotel	Albany	Yes			Under restoration.	Part of the Albany Downtown Commercial Historic District.
2012	Uppertown Net Shed	Astoria					Relisted for 2016 and 2017. Aka Uppertown Net Loft, "Big Red".
2012	View Point Inn	Corbett	Yes			Under restoration.	
2012	Willamette Falls Locks	West Linn	Yes			Under restoration.	
2013	Antelope School	Antelope	Yes; Listed in 2016			Under restoration.	
2013	Astoria Marine Construction	Astoria	Yes; Listed in 2014			Clean up of chemical contamination was completed in 2022.	Also a federal EPA Superfund site.
2013	Dirigible Hangar B	Tillamook	Yes	Dirigible Hangar B (Tillamook Air Museum)		Structural assessment done. Funds being sought.	
2013	Dome Building	Salem	Yes			Restored.	Part of the Oregon State Hospital Historic District.
2013	Knotts-Owens Barn	Corvallis				Assessment completed. Grants received.	Part of the City of Corvallis' Owens Farm Natural Area.
2013	Multnomah County Courthouse	Portland	Yes	Multnomah County Courthouse		Awaiting restoration.	
2013	Oregon Trail Pioneer Farmsteads	Various Willamette Valley structures built between 1841 and 1865.	May be individually listed.			Various.	May be part of the Settlement-era Dwellings, Barns and Farm Groups of the Willamette Valley, Oregon, 1841-circa 1865 MPD (Multiple Property Document). 255 surviving homes, barns, and outbuildings from this era remained in 2013.
2013	Pioneer Mothers Memorial Cabin	Champoeg		Pioneer Mothers Memorial Cabin Museum		Moved within Champoeg and restored.	Now located at the Newell Pioneer Village museum.
2013	Saling House	Weston	Yes	Isham Saling House		Stabilized. Pending restoration.	
2013	The Dalles Chinatown Site	The Dalles	Yes			Potential archaeological sites threatened.	Part of The Dalles Commercial Historic District.
2015	First Congregational Church Bell Tower	Portland	Yes			Restored.	
2015	Eastern Oregon University Grand Staircase	La Grande	Yes	Eastern Oregon University Grand Staircase		Restored	Relisted for 2016 and 2017. Part of Inlow Hall.
2015	Gray Building	Portland				Demolished c. 2017.	Relisted for 2016 and 2017. c. 1900 Black historic site. Housed various soul food restaurants including the Burger Barn.
2015	Mildred Kanipe House	Oakland		Mildred Kanipe House			Relisted for 2016 and 2017. Part of Mildred Kanipe Memorial County Park.
2015	Shipley-Cook Barn	Lake Oswego	Yes			Restored.	Part of the Shipley-Cook Farmstead.
2015	Smith Straw Barn	Cave Junction					Aka Martin Powers Barn. 1896 barn donated to ODOT for a wayside in 1991 and never maintained.
2015	Wong Laundry	Portland	Yes				Relisted for 2016, 2017 and 2018. Part of the Portland New Chinatown/Japantown Historic District
2016	Floed–Lane House	Roseburg	Yes				
2016	A. T. Smith House	Forest Grove	Yes			Under restoration.	Relisted for 2017. Documented in the Historic American Buildings Survey (HABS).
2016	Peter John Lindberg House	Port Orford	Yes			Destroyed by fire in 2021.	
2016	Fort Rock Museum Homestead	Fort Rock					1911 Belletable House restored.
2016	Sumpter Valley Railroad Depot	Prairie City	Yes			As of 2017 assessed and funds being sought.	Relisted for 2017 and 2018. Aka the Dewitt Museum.
2016	Oregon Caves Chateau & Historic District	Cave Junction	Yes			Chateau is under restoration.	Relisted for 2017.
2016	Upper Sandy Guard Station	Mount Hood National Forest	Yes				Relisted for 2017, 2018 and 2019
2016	Concord School	Oak Grove				Planning and funding underway.	Relisted for 2017 and 2018. Acquired by the North Clackamas Parks & Recreation District in 2018.
2017	Elks Lodge in Medford	Medford	Yes				Relisted for 2018 and 2019
2017	M & N Building	Astoria				Restored; Won DeMuro Award in 2019	Aka the Mary & Nellie (Flavel) Building.
2017	Vale Hotel	Vale	Yes	Vale Hotel and Grand Opera House			Relisted for 2018 and 2019
2018	Astoria Ferry (Tourist No. 2)	Astoria	Yes			Partially sank and was demolished in 2022.	Relisted for 2019
2018	Butte Creek Mill	Eagle Point	Yes				Relisted for 2019
2018	Heryford Building	Lakeview	Yes				Relisted for 2019
2018	Oregon Agricultural Experiment Station (OSU) Red Barn	Union					Relisted for 2019
2018	Santiam Pass Ski Lodge	Santiam Pass	Yes				Relisted for 2019 and 2020
2019	Waldron Brothers Drugstore	The Dalles					Relisted for 2020
2019	Cumberland Church	Albany	Yes			Under restoration.	Relisted for 2020
2019	Robert and Charles Wilson Homes	Warm Springs					Relisted for 2020
2020	Billy Webb Elks Lodge	Portland	Yes				
2020	Mayo House	Portland					
2020	Oregon's Rural Historic Theaters	Various					
2022	Gates School	Gates		Former Gates Elementary School		Survived the Beachie Creek Fire; restoration efforts underway	

== See also ==
- Historic preservation
- History of Oregon
- Lists of Oregon-related topics
- National Register of Historic Places listings in Oregon
