= Mayo House =

Mayo House may refer to:

- Mayo House (Marvell, Arkansas), listed on the U.S. National Register of Historic Places
- Helton-Mayo Farm, Bedford, Indiana, listed on the NRHP in Lawrence County, Indiana
- Mayo Mansion, also known as John C.C. Mayo Mansion and Office, Paintsville, Kentucky, listed on the NRHP in Johnson County, Kentucky
- Mayo Mansion (Ashland, Kentucky), listed on the NRHP in Boyd County, Kentucky as part of the Bath Avenue Historic District
- Thomas Mayo House, Paintsville, Kentucky, listed on the NRHP in Johnson County, Kentucky
- Moore-Mayo House, Bass Harbor, Maine, listed on the NRHP in Hancock County, Maine
- Mayo House (Portland, Oregon)
- Dr. William J. Mayo House, Rochester, Minnesota, NRHP-listed
- Dr. William W. Mayo House, Le Sueur, Minnesota, NRHP-listed
- Taylor-Mayo House, Richmond, Virginia, listed on the NRHP in Richmond, Virginia

== See also ==
- Mayo Building (disambiguation)
- Mayo Hotel, Tulsa, Oklahoma, NRHP-listed
