= Cochran House =

Cochran House or Cochran Farm or Cochran Barn may refer to:

- Cochran–Wilson–Owen Estate, Fort Payne, Alabama, listed on the Alabama Register of Landmarks and Heritage in DeKalb–Jackson county
- Killian–Appleton–Cochran House, Fort Payne, Alabama, listed on the Alabama Register of Landmarks and Heritage in DeKalb–Jackson county
- Guy H. Cochran House, Loma Drive, Los Angeles, California, designed by Elmer Grey
- Cochran House, a facility at the former Fairfield State Hospital in Newtown, Connecticut
- Cochran Grange, also known as John P. Cochran House, NRHP-listed in Middletown, Delaware
- Cochran–Helton–Lindley House, Bloomington, Indiana, listed on the NRHP in Monroe County
- Jehiel Cochran House, Andover, Massachusetts, NRHP-listed
- Cochran–Cassanova House, Ocean Springs, Mississippi, listed on the NRHP in Jackson County
- William Cochran House, Stevensville, Montana, listed on the NRHP in Ravalli County
- Cochran Farm, Millville, Ohio, NRHP-listed
- Cochran House, Trinway, Ohio, a historic house
- Hargis–Mitchell–Cochran House, Wynnewood, Oklahoma, listed on the NRHP in Garvin County
- William Cochran Barn, Brownsville, Oregon, listed on the NRHP in Linn County
- Cochran–Rice Farm Complex, Cottage Grove, Oregon, listed on the NRHP in Lane County, Oregon
- Henry Cochran house, 3511 Baring Street, Philadelphia, Pennsylvania, designed by Wilson Eyre
- Mary Cochrane Barn, Maryville, Tennessee, listed on the NRHP in Blount County
- Neill–Cochran House, Austin, Texas, NRHP-listed

== See also ==
- Butte–Cochran Charcoal Ovens, Florence, Arizona, NRHP-listed
- Cochran Municipal Building and School, Cochran, Georgia, NRHP-listed
- Philip G. Cochran Memorial United Methodist Church, Dawson, Pennsylvania, NRHP-listed
