= Petersen Rock Garden =

Rock garden and museum in Central Oregon, U.S.

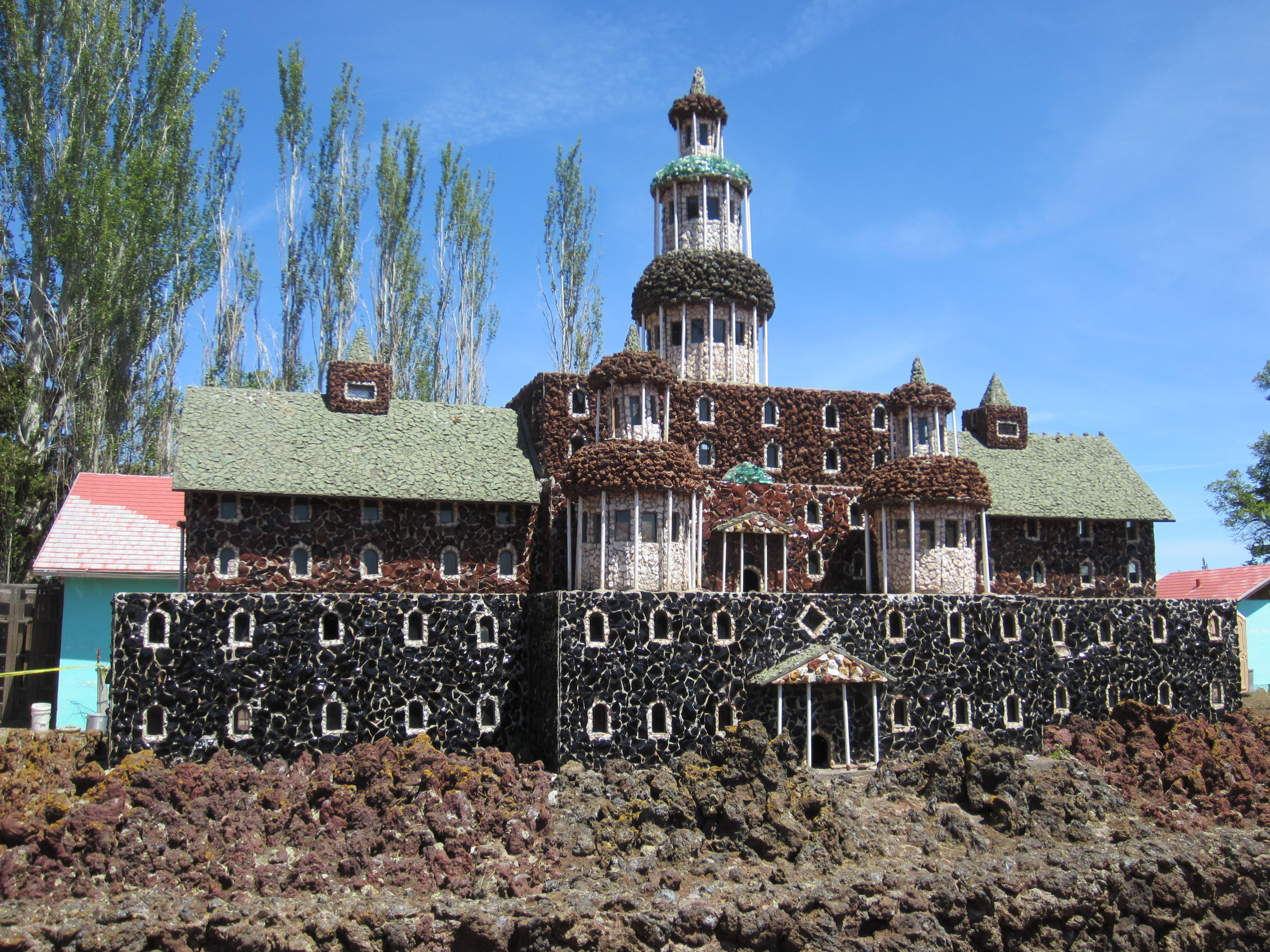
- One of the rock garden's many miniature buildings, 2013

- Location within Oregon
- Established: 1935
- Location: 7930 Southwest 77th Street; Deschutes County, Oregon
- Coordinates: 44°12′11″N 121°15′44″W
- Type: Rock garden
- Director: Charles Bartlemay
- Owner: Marci Wayman
- Website: www.petersenrockgarden.org

Petersen Rock Garden, formerly Petersen's Rock Garden and also known as the Petersen Rock Gardens, is a rock garden and museum on 4 acres (1.6 ha), located between the cities of Bend and Redmond in Deschutes County, Oregon, United States. Rasmus Petersen, a Danish immigrant who settled in Central Oregon in the early 1900s, began constructing the garden in 1935 using rocks he found within an 85-mile (137 km) radius of his family home. Petersen constructed detailed miniature castles, churches and other small buildings and monuments from a variety of rock types. He incorporated other design elements such as bridges, water features, and natural landscaping. Petersen worked on the garden until his death in 1952; it remained in his family's care until it was sold in 2023. The garden, considered a roadside attraction with novelty architecture, includes roaming peafowl and a museum with a gift shop that sells rocks.

In 2011, Petersen Rock Garden was named one of Oregon's Most Endangered Places by the Historic Preservation League of Oregon (now known as Restore Oregon). In 2012, accidental damage to one of the stone bridges by a contractor catalyzed an effort to document the garden using laser scanning and other technologies. The garden was closed temporarily in 2013 to undergo repair and review for listing on the National Register of Historic Places. Petersen has been praised for his creative work, and the garden has received a positive reception for its uniqueness and local significance. Listing on the National Register was achieved on October 30, 2013. The garden closed indefinitely in 2016 because of high repair costs. In June 2022, Petersen was listed for sale. The property sold to new owners in 2023, and the garden reopened in April 2026 after a year of renovation work by its nonprofit operators and volunteers.

== Description ==
Petersen Rock Garden, considered a roadside attraction with "eclectic" novelty architecture, is located 3 miles (4.8 km) off U.S. Route 97, 10 miles (16 km) north of Bend and 7 miles (11 km) south of Redmond. It contains dozens of "fanciful" and "intricately detailed" miniature buildings, including castles, churches and cottages, constructed from agate, jasper, lava, malachite, obsidian, petrified wood and thundereggs.

The 4-acre (1.6 ha) grounds also contain roaming peafowl and a small museum with a gift shop that sells rocks, including crystals, fossils and semiprecious gemstones. The museum features a fluorescent room with miniature castles constructed from manganese, tungsten, uranium and zinc that glow in the dark. As of 2026, the garden is open from 10 a.m. to 4 p.m., Friday through Monday, with a suggested donation of $10 for admission. It is not a member of the Oregon Museums Association.

== History ==
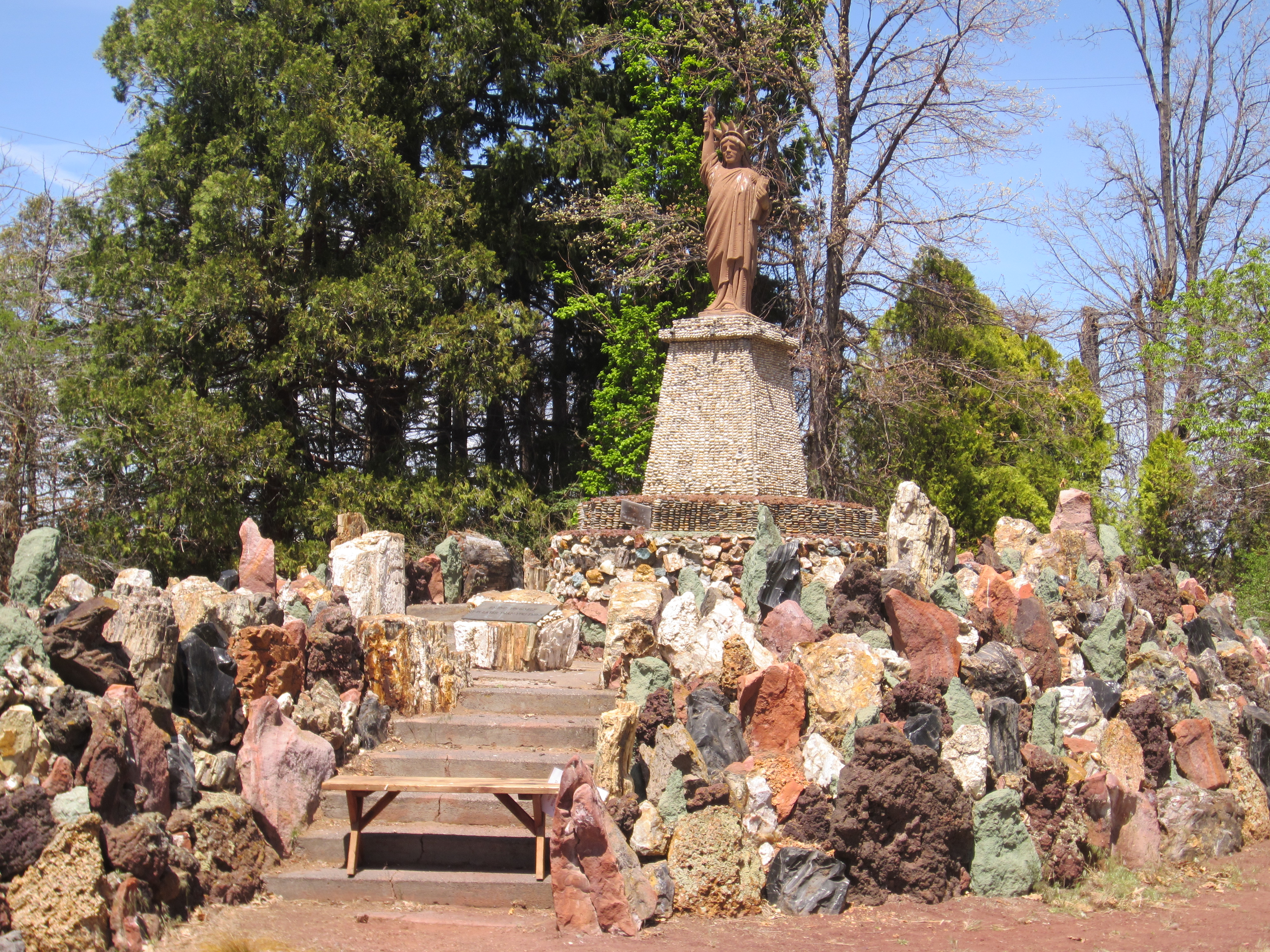
Petersen created monuments to the United States, including a replica of the Statue of Liberty.

Rasmus Petersen, a Danish immigrant who settled in Central Oregon in the early 1900s at age 17, began constructing the rock garden on the grounds of his family home in 1935. The "eccentric" farmer used rocks that he found within an 85-mile (137 km) radius. He attempted to evoke his native country with his designs, but also created monuments to the United States, including a concrete American flag and a 7-foot (2.1 m) replica of the Statue of Liberty. Petersen incorporated other design elements such as bridges, water features (lagoons, lily ponds and streams) and natural landscaping. He worked on the garden until his death in 1952; the garden remained in his family's care for the next seven decades. A bronze plaque in front of the Statue of Liberty replica reads: "Enjoy yourself: it's later than you think." Petersen's Rock Garden became known as Petersen Rock Garden in the mid-1950s. At its height, supported by traffic from the Old Bend-Redmond Highway, the garden drew approximately 150,000 visitors a year.

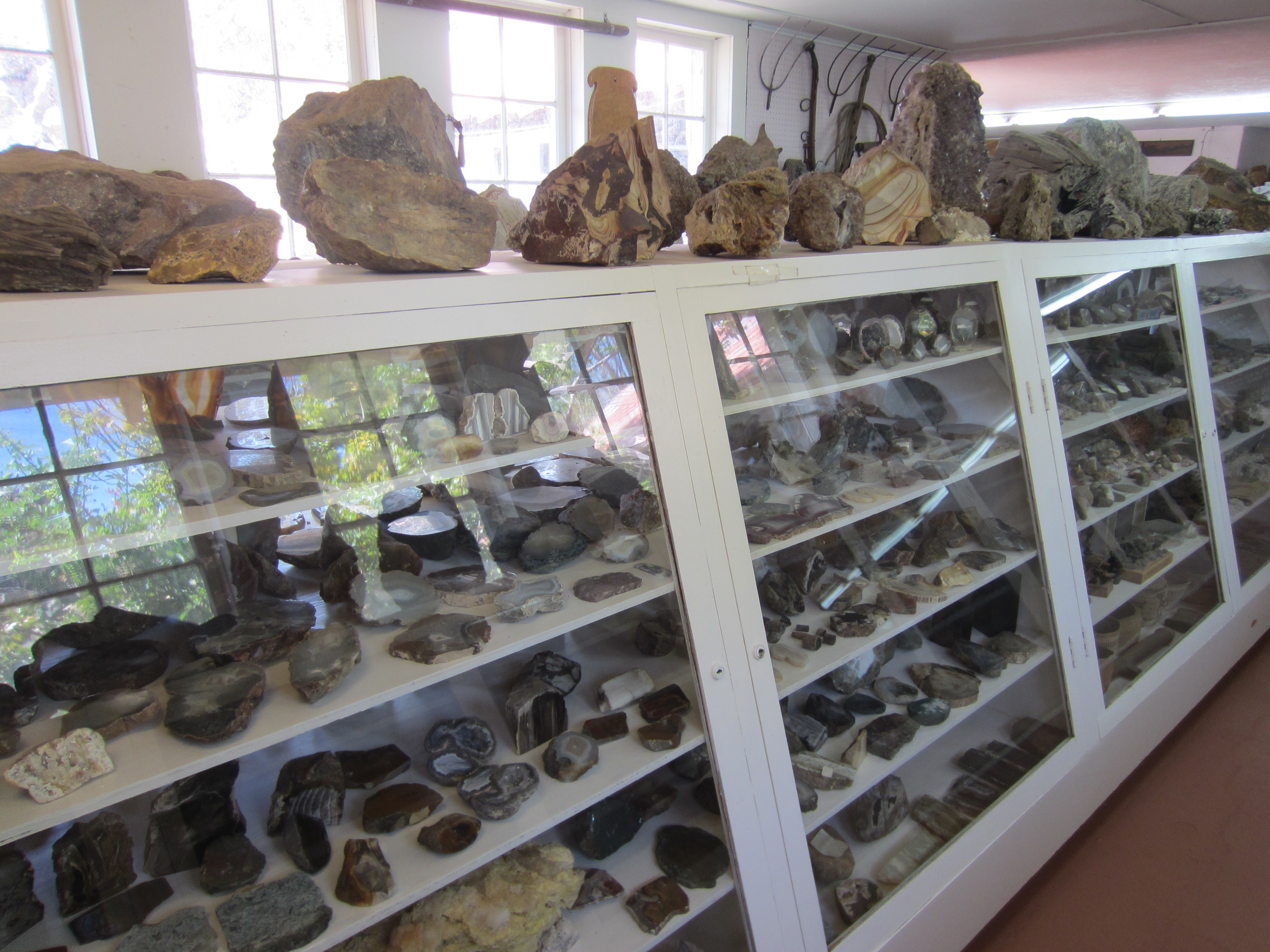
Interior of the museum

The garden was managed and owned by Petersen's grand-stepdaughter, Susan Caward, and her family, who struggled to maintain the lawns and dozens of sculptures. In 2011, the garden was named one of Oregon's Most Endangered Places by the Historic Preservation League of Oregon (now known as Restore Oregon). The "Endangered Places" program raises awareness of the state's "historic treasures in need of the advocacy and support to save them from demise". According to the League, the deteriorating garden needed "maintenance, a business plan and a publicity campaign to ensure stewardship and funds are available to overcome vandalism, theft, and condition issues". In 2012, a contractor accidentally damaged one of the stone bridges, catalyzing an effort to document the garden using laser scanning and other technologies. The Portland-based company i-Ten measured and archived the site's geospatial data, allowing potential future rebuilding to match the original construction.

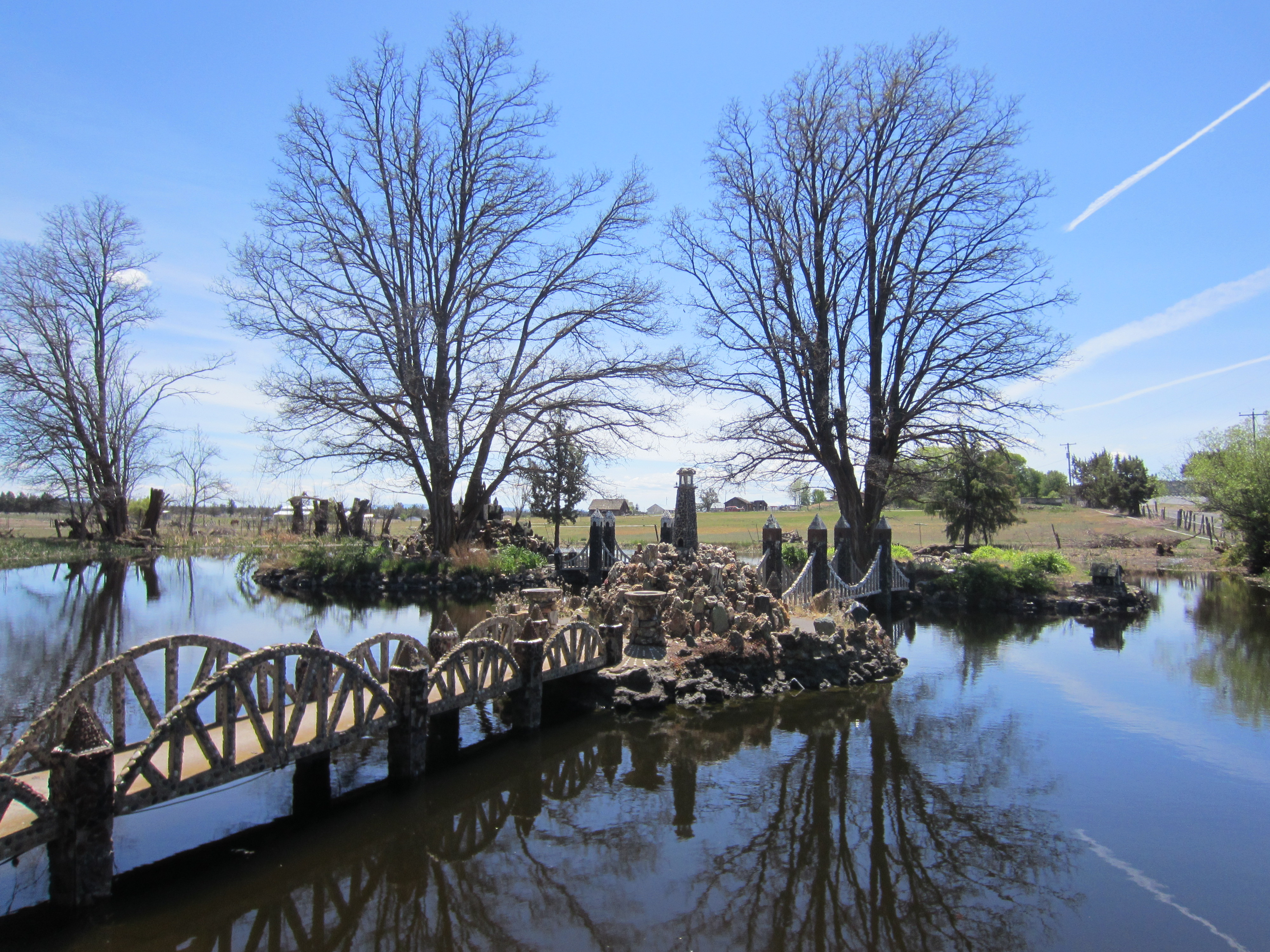
Bridges at the garden in 2013

The garden was closed from February 1 through May 24, 2013 to undergo repair and review for listing on the National Register of Historic Places. The family and ten volunteers worked for nearly six months to restore the grounds. The cleanup process included the removal of dead vegetation and junk from outbuildings, and an estate sale that included items from before Petersen's death. On May 25, 2013, Petersen Rock Garden hosted its "grand reopening". The opening was attended by members of the Confederated Tribes of Warm Springs, who sang and blessed the garden. Caward has considered opening a cafe on the grounds, and turning the family home into a bed and breakfast. Owen Evans, a friend of the family who has assisted with the restoration, has also envisioned a museum reorganization, a small amphitheater to host outdoor concerts and other events, and additional rock sculptures mimicking Petersen's style.

Petersen Rock Garden was added to the National Register of Historic Places on October 30, 2013. The garden closed indefinitely in September 2016. Caward said closing was necessary because of repair costs and the cancellation of the garden's insurance due to safety concerns. The dilapidated garden was still accessible but remained in a state of disrepair, as of October 2017.

The property was sold in 2023 and fully reopened in 2026, now operating as a non-profit. The full reopening was preceded by a year of restoration, by volunteers and a $20,000 grant from a local home improvement company. Improvements included replacements to the museum's floor, paint, and a reorganization of the museum's rock collection. The garden reopened with a ribbon-cutting ceremony on April 4, 2026, attended by hundreds of visitors.

== Reception ==
According to the Northwest Digital Archives, photographer Myron Symons typed the following description of the garden during the 1940s within a photo album that is now part of University of Washington Libraries, Special Collections:

Miniature castles, picturesque fountains and beautiful terraces within the grounds pictured here, on the Rasmus Peterson [sic] place between Bend and Redmond, Oregon, tell their own stories, but unless the visitor inspects the grounds carefully, and with a questing heart, he will fail to read the strange stories told by the ancient stones used in the construction. ... Look twice at that bit of petrified wood, for it is a remnant of a great redwood forest that once flourished in Central Oregon. ... Examine that banded rock carefully: It is a bit of a thunderegg hatched in the lavas of old Oregon. ... Feel the cool surface of those glass-like rocks: They are volcanic glasses melted in plutonic fires. ... Trace the growth rings on that bit of petrified sequoia: They tell a story of weather born of oceans that swept over beaches now elevated into Oregon mountains. Enjoy the blooms of these rock gardens, but do not overlook the stories of the rocks.

External images
- Rock garden sculptures in Rasmus Petersen's Rock Garden (Myron Symons)
- Rasmus Petersen's Rock Garden and pond (Myron Symons)
- Rasmus Petersen's Rock Garden and house (Myron Symons)

Petersen Rock Garden has attracted visitors from around the world. In 2009, The Oregonian's Terry Richard wrote that Petersen's work is "more than a half-century old, but it's still amazing". The Historic Preservation League of Oregon considers the garden a "real gem" for its local significance and its "unique expression of mid-century roadside architecture". Moon Publications described it as a "full-fledged rock fantasy" and a "rock garden to end all rock gardens", with a "funky" museum. Via, the online magazine for the American Automobile Association's West Coast club, called the garden "folksy" and Petersen "imaginative" for his work.

The garden has inspired at least one other Oregon resident to construct rock sculptures. Following his visit to Petersen Rock Garden in the early 1980s, Ira McKissen built nearly a dozen castles on the terraces of his Rowena home; some of them have since been relocated to his daughter's house, located 5 miles (8.0 km) west of The Dalles along the Historic Columbia River Highway (U.S. Route 30). In 2013, Pennan Brae released a music video for the song "Don't Know Nothing 'Bout Love", which was filmed at Petersen Rock Garden.

== See also ==
- Geology of the Pacific Northwest
- List of museums in Oregon
- National Register of Historic Places listings in Deschutes County, Oregon
