= Elks Lodge (Medford, Oregon) =

- BPOE Lodge No. 1168
- U.S. National Register of Historic Places
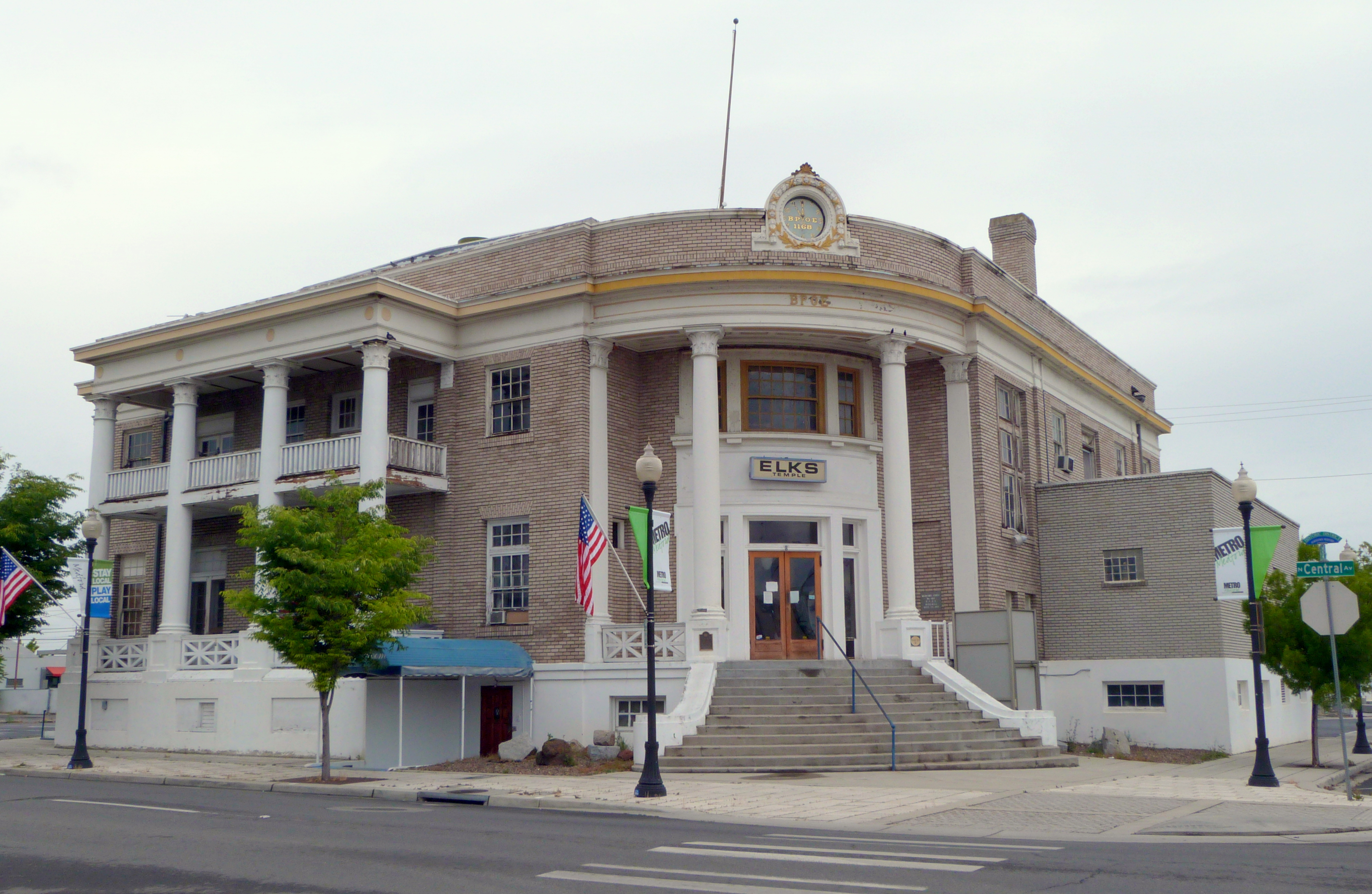
- The building's front exterior in 2013

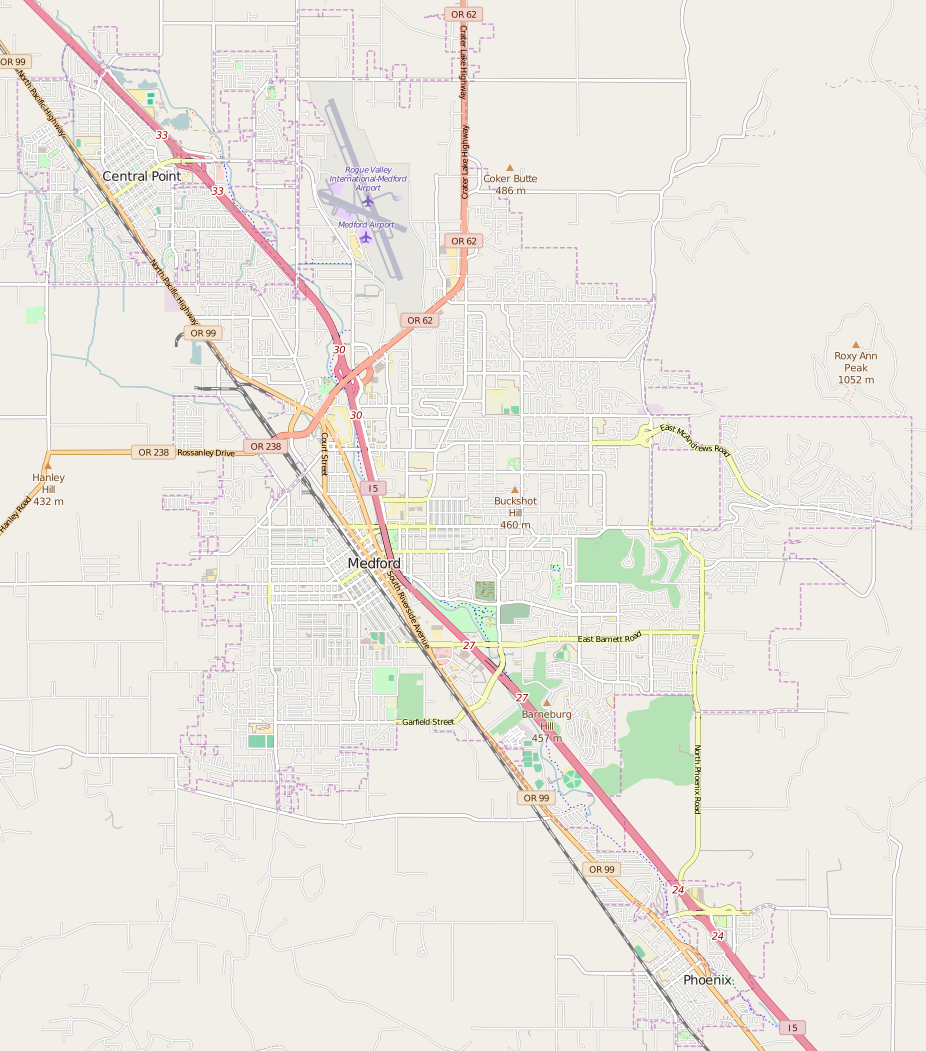
- Location within Medford OR
- Location: 202 N. Central Ave., Medford, Oregon
- Coordinates: 42°19′43″N 122°52′25″W
- Area: less than one acre
- Built: 1915
- Architect: Frank Chamberlain Clark
- Architectural style: Beaux Arts
- NRHP reference No.: 80003323
- Added to NRHP: November 28, 1980

The Elks Lodge, or Medford Elks Building (also known as BPOE Lodge No. 1168), in Medford, Oregon, was built in 1915. The building, located at 202 N. Central Ave, was closed by the Benevolent and Protective Order of Elks in 2014, and sold in 2017. It was named one of Oregon's Most Endangered Places by Restore Oregon.

The building was designed by architect Frank Chamberlain Clark in Beaux Arts style.

== See also ==
- List of Elks buildings
- List of Oregon's Most Endangered Places
