= Jantzen Beach Carousel =

- C. W. Parker Four-Row Park Carousel
- Formerly listed on the U.S. National Register of Historic Places
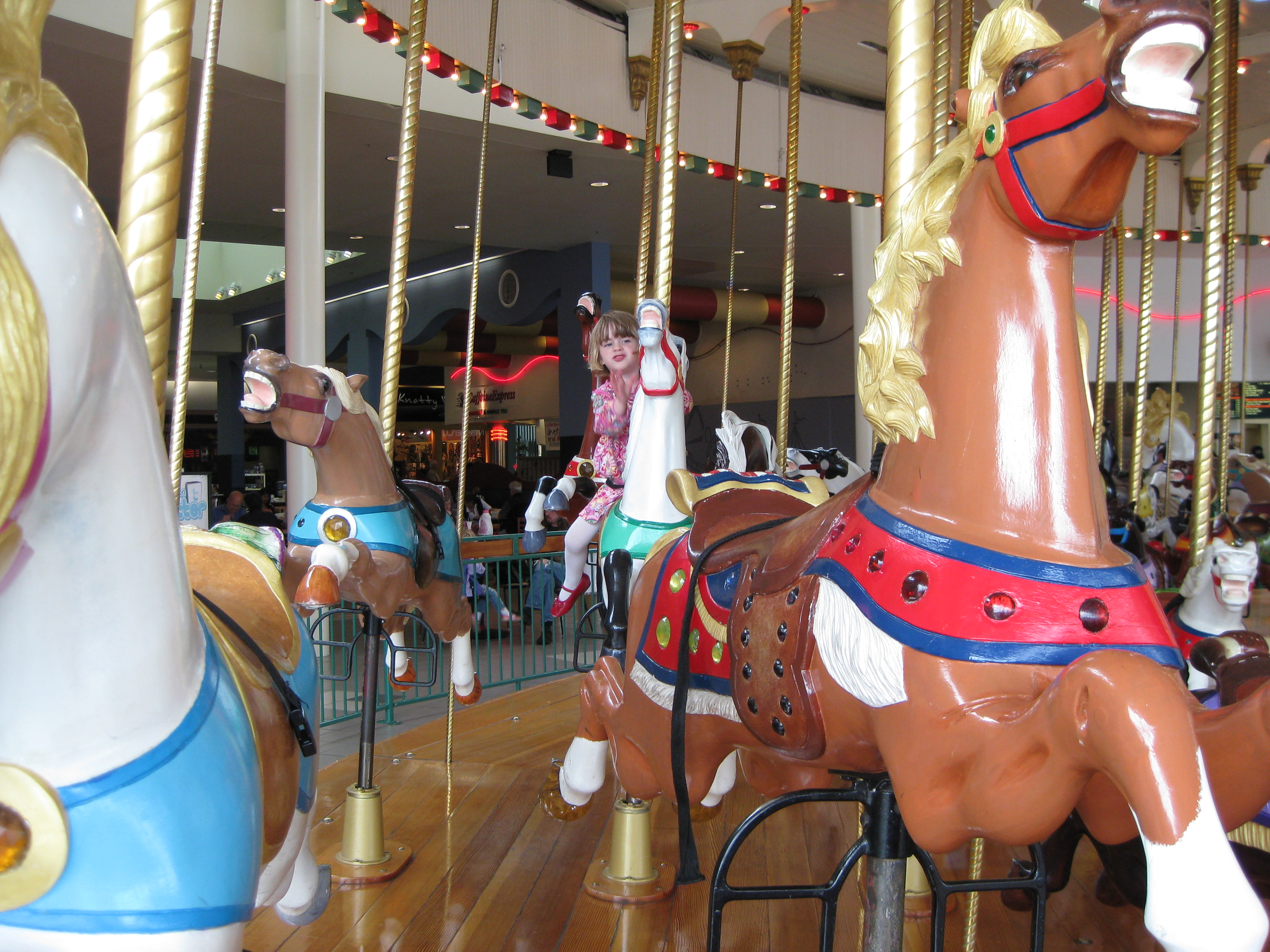
- The carousel in 2009
- Location: 1492 Jantzen Beach Center, Portland, Oregon
- Built: 1921
- Built by: Parker, Charles Wallace
- MPS: Oregon Historic Wooden Carousels TR
- NRHP reference No.: 87001381

Significant dates
- Added to NRHP: August 26, 1987
- Removed from NRHP: January 4, 2008

The Jantzen Beach Carousel, formerly listed on the National Register of Historic Places as the C. W. Parker Four-Row Park Carousel, is a carousel formerly installed at Portland, Oregon's Jantzen Beach Amusement Park and later the Jantzen Beach Center shopping mall, in the United States, until 2012. It has been the subject of concern for historic preservationists since them, and a planned new site for the carousel was identified in 2017. As of September 2023, it was planned by Restore Oregon to be restored and relocated for display at the National Neon Sign Museum in The Dalles, Oregon.

== History ==
The carousel was supposedly built circa 1904 by Charles Wallace Parker in Abilene, Kansas, for use at the 1904 St. Louis World's Fair, according to its National Register of Historic Places (NRHP) nomination and The Oregonian. According to the Oregon Historical Society and its current owners, it was built in 1921 for installation on the Venice Amusement Pier in Venice Beach, California. In 1924, the carousel was repossessed for non-payment. After being put in storage, it was purchased and relocated to Portland for the opening of Jantzen Beach Amusement Park in 1928. The amusement park was torn down in 1970 and replaced with the Jantzen Beach Center shopping mall; the carousel was the only amusement park feature retained at the new mall complex. In 2012, the carousel was removed during a major renovation to the mall, and was then held in on-site storage for about 15 years.

In 1987, the carousel was listed on the NRHP, along with four others. However, it was delisted in 2008 because of plans for the relocation of the carousel to the Portland Children's Museum, which never came to fruition. The carousel was designated "endangered" by the Architectural Heritage Center. In 2012, it was added to the Historic Preservation League of Oregon's (now Restore Oregon) list of Oregon's Most Endangered Places, and remains identified as such in 2025.

=== 2015 sale and restoration ===
In 2015, the mall's owner, a company called Edens, said the carousel was being "safely stored in a camera-monitored, climate-controlled" building at the shopping center. However, in early 2017, The Oregonian reported that the current owner and location of the carousel were unknown; Edens said the carousel was sold to Kimco Realty, while the latter company claimed its purchase of Jantzen Beach Center included the land and buildings, but not the carousel.

On September 7, 2017, it was made public that the carousel had been donated in spring 2017 to Restore Oregon. The donation had been kept private until the transfer was complete. In 2023, The Astorian reported that Astoria was being considered as a permanent location.

On March 5, 2023, Restore Oregon sent a call for a permanent home for the carousel, stating that it was not the intention of the organization to house the carousel permanently. Later that year in September, Restore Oregon announced that the carousel had found a new home at the Neon Sign Museum in The Dalles, Oregon. The museum planned to begin construction of a new pavilion to house the carousel.

== See also ==
- Allan Herschell Two-Abreast Carousel, another formerly listed Oregon carousel placed in storage
- Amusement rides on the National Register of Historic Places
- List of Oregon's Most Endangered Places
- National Register of Historic Places listings in North Portland, Oregon
