= Waldron Brothers Drugstore =

Historic building in The Dalles, Oregon, U.S.

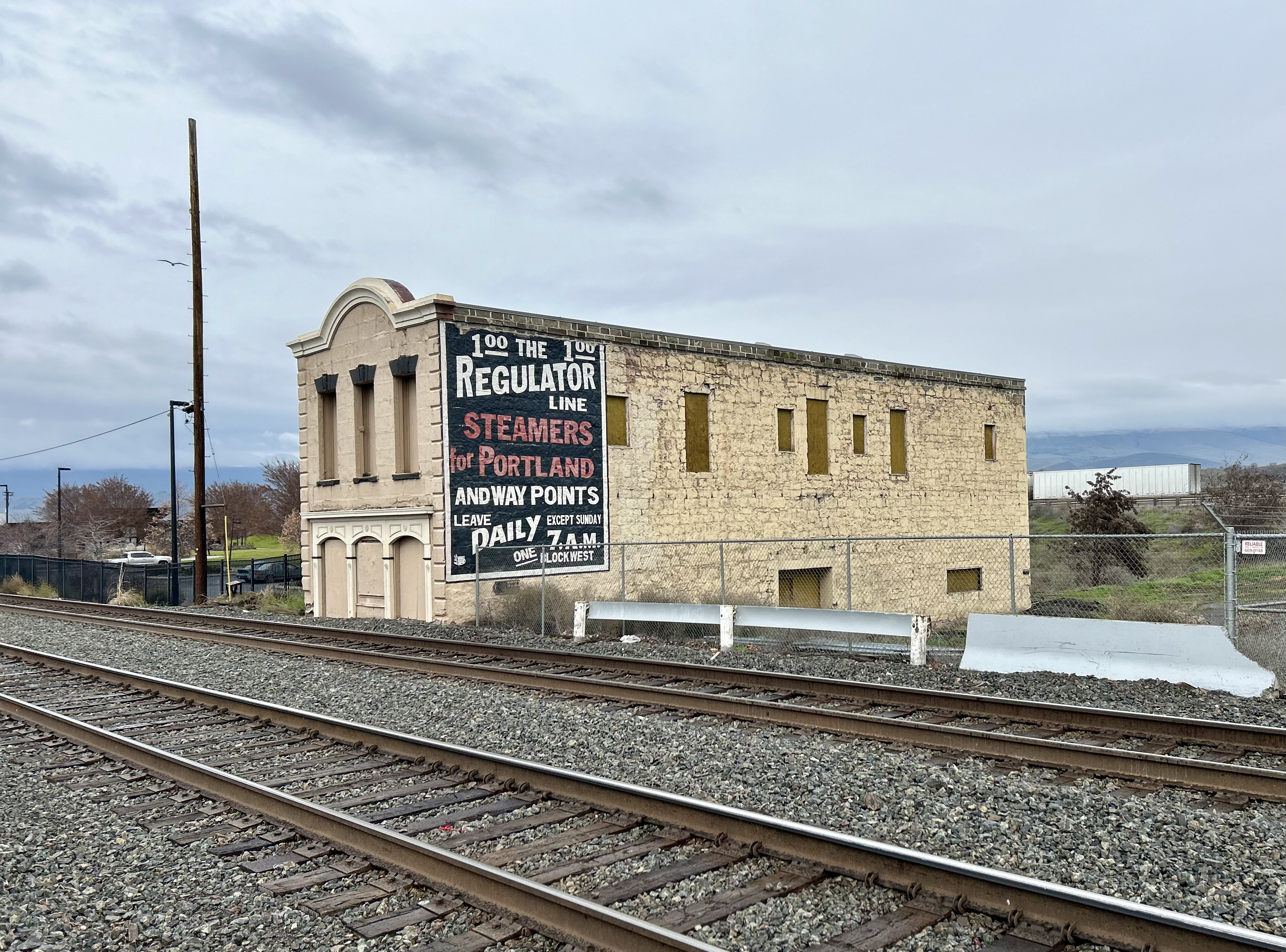
- The Waldron Brothers Drugstore, The Dalles Oregon, December 2023
- Interactive map of the Waldron Brothers Drugstore area

General information
- Location: The Dalles, Oregon, United States
- Coordinates: 45°36′08″N 121°10′52″W
- Completed: 1864

The Waldron Brothers Drugstore, also known as the Gitchell Building, is the oldest intact building in The Dalles, Oregon. Built in 1864, the structure has served as a pharmacy, a post office, a ticket office, a Masonic lodge, a haunted house, and as apartments. It has also housed offices for a local newspaper. The building underwent repairs in 2009 but has been slated for demolition. It was included Restore Oregon's 2019 list of Oregon's most endangered places. Following an effort to save the building, Dalles City Council chose preservation.
