= View Point Inn =

- U.S. National Register of Historic Places
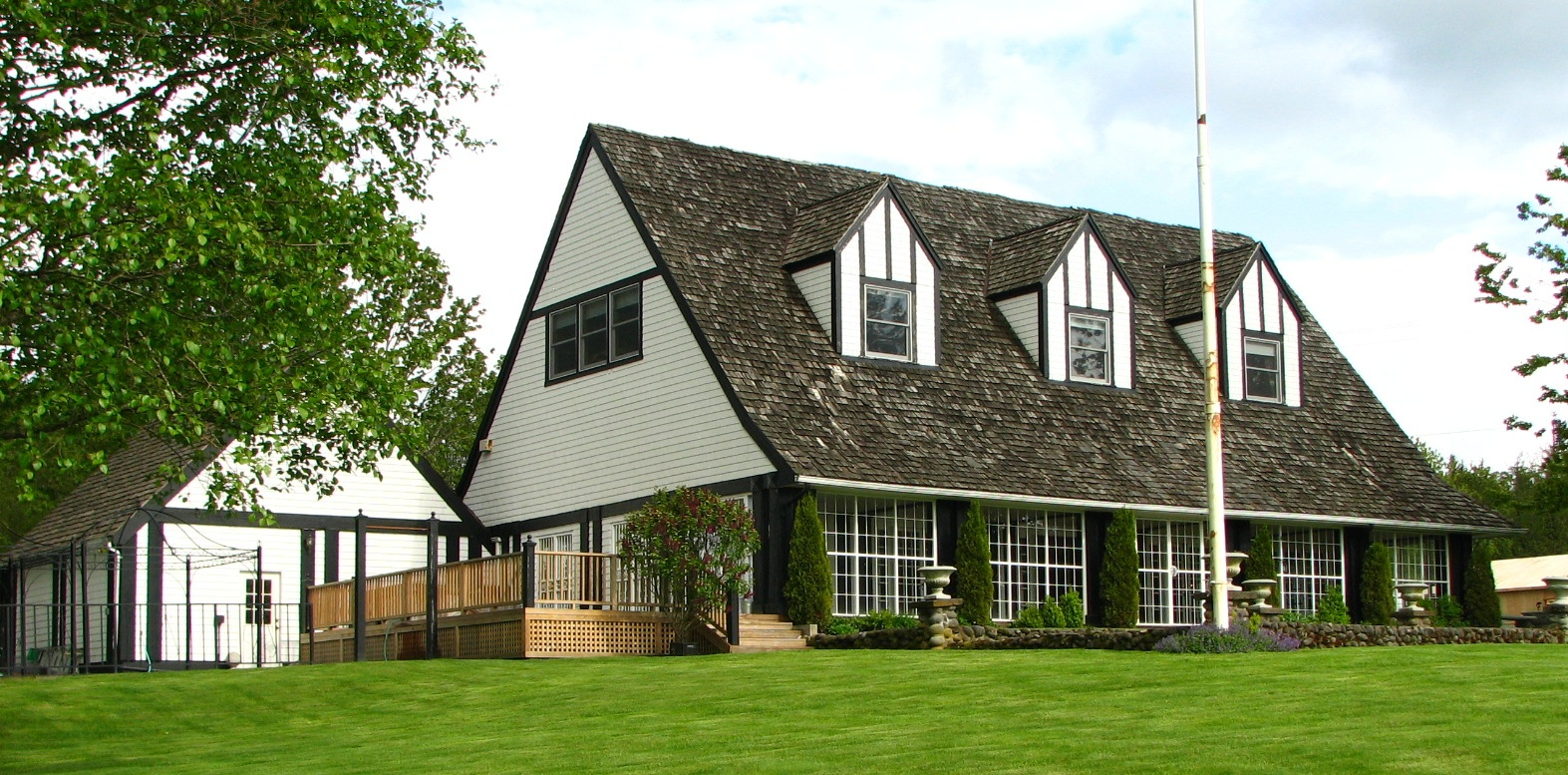
- The inn in 2007, from the lawn facing the Columbia River Gorge
- Location: Corbett, Oregon
- Coordinates: 45°31′59″N 122°14′55″W
- Built: 1924
- Architect: Carl L. Linde
- NRHP reference No.: 85000367
- Added to NRHP: February 28, 1985

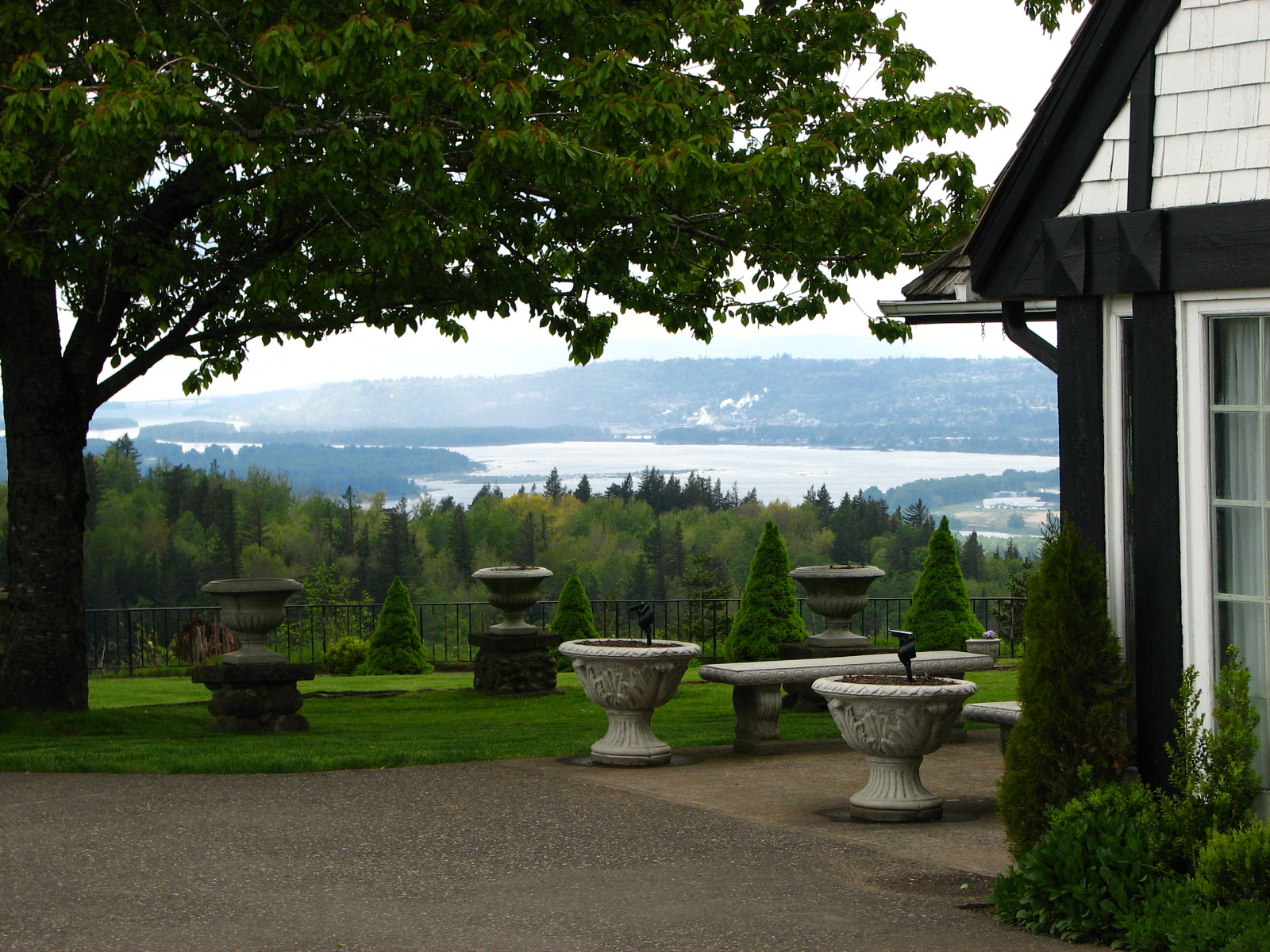
The view of the Gorge that gives the inn its name.

The View Point Inn, located in Corbett, Oregon, is listed on the National Register of Historic Places.

In 2008, the inn was used in filming of prom scenes in the first film of the Twilight Saga film series. The exposure generated by the film was credited with giving the hotel and its restaurant a boost in business.

In July 2011, the building's second floor was gutted by a fire, and its owners, Geoff Thompson and Angelo Simione, faced financial difficulties, as the insurance on the building had lapsed. In October 2013, plans were made to rebuild and reopen the historic structure, with work slated to begin the winter of 2013–2014. Restore Oregon listed the inn on its 2012 list of Endangered Places; in December 2014 it reported that restoration was unlikely.

In 2016, Heiner and Sheron Fruehauf purchased the Inn and began restoration. According to the owners, they anticipate reopening the Inn as a holistic health retreat in 2024.

== See also ==
- List of Oregon's Most Endangered Places
- National Register of Historic Places listings in Multnomah County, Oregon
