= Mayo Building =

Mayo Building or Mayo Hall may refer to:

in India

- Mayo Hall (Bangalore), a historic building

in the United States

- Mayo Building (Rochester, Minnesota), in Minnesota, a modern complex
- Plummer Building, Rochester, Minnesota, also known as Mayo Clinic Building
- Mayo Building (Tulsa, Oklahoma), listed on the NRHP in Tulsa County, Oklahoma
- Mayo Hall (Commerce, Texas), listed on the U.S. National Register of Historic Places
- Mayo Building (Northfield, Vermont), listed on the NRHP in Washington County, Vermont

== See also ==
- Mayo Hotel, Tulsa, Oklahoma, NRHP-listed
- Mayo House (disambiguation)
