= Allan Herschell Two-Abreast Carousel =

Restored antique carousel formerly in Seaside, Oregon

- Formerly listed on the U.S. National Register of Historic Places
- Location: Seaside, Oregon
- Coordinates: 45.9935°N 123.9264°W
- Built: c. 1926
- NRHP reference No.: 87001382

Significant dates
- Added to NRHP: August 26, 1987
- Removed from NRHP: May 27, 1998

The Allan Herschell Two-Abreast Carousel is an antique carousel formerly located in the Seaside Town Center shopping mall in Seaside, Oregon, United States. It was built in c. 1926 and was added to the National Register of Historic Places in 1987. The carousel was delisted in 1998 and was in storage as of 2011. It is owned by the Perron family.

== See also ==
- Amusement rides on the National Register of Historic Places
- Jantzen Beach Carousel, another formerly listed Oregon carousel placed in storage
- National Register of Historic Places listings in Clatsop County, Oregon
