= Upper Sandy Guard Station Cabin =

- U.S. National Register of Historic Places
- U.S. Historic district
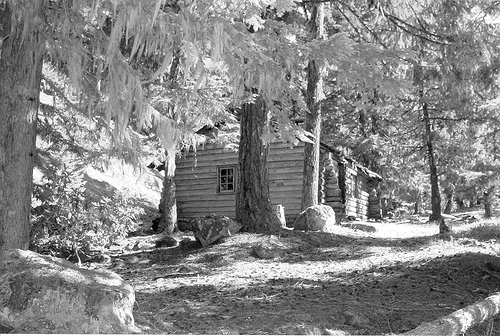
- Historic guard station cabin

- Location within Oregon Location within the United States
- Location: 4.5 mi. E. of jct. FS Rds. 18 and 1825, Mt. Hood National Forest, vicinity of Government Camp, Oregon
- Coordinates: 45°22′38.451″N 121°46′58.452″W
- Area: less than 1 acre (0.40 ha)
- NRHP reference No.: 09000705
- Added to NRHP: September 9, 2009

The Upper Sandy Guard Station Cabin is a log and stone building built in 1935. It was funded as part of the Federal work relief Emergency Relief Appropriations Act of that year, and also by funds from the City of Portland, Oregon.

It is "an exceptional expression of a 'rugged' Rustic style U.S. Forest Service building", and is the only cabin constructed of its particular design. Out of 700 Forest Service administration buildings built in Oregon and Washington during 1933-1942, it is the only one built with both stone and logs as principal materials.

It was built in 1935 to house an administrative guard who was to prevent intrusions into the area, part of the city of Portland's water supply area. It is located in what is now Mt. Hood National Forest, about 5 miles from Government Camp in Clackamas County, Oregon.

The building was listed on the U.S. National Register of Historic Places in September, 2009. The listing was announced as the featured listing in the National Park Service's weekly list of September 18, 2009. The building was argued to be eligible for NRHP listing by each of several criteria: that it was eligible in the areas "of Conservation for its association with early USDA Forest Service recreation management and its concurrent role in the protection of the Bull Run watershed", in the area of Politics/Government for its association with Franklin D. Roosevelt's New Deal Programs, and in the area of Architecture as a "unique example" of "non-intrusive design philosophy that evolved among land-management agencies during the period of 1933-1942". It was labor-intensive to build and would not have been replicated any time after the onset of World War II.

The building "is also believed to be the only existing cabin with its unique battered corners and mortared stone extension in the Pacific Northwest."

According to the National Park Service:

The Upper Sandy Guard Station Cabin, built in 1935, is an exceptional expression of a "rugged" Rustic style U.S. Forest Service building constructed by skilled local carpenters and laborers assisted by men employed under one of President Franklin D. Roosevelt's New Deal work relief programs. Funded by the Emergency Relief Appropriations (ERA) Act of 1935, and cooperating funds from the City of Portland, the cabin was built along the newly constructed Timberline Trail specifically to provide housing for an administrative guard to protect the Bull Run Division watershed, the source of the City of Portland's drinking water supply, from public entry. The guard station is no longer used as an administrative site and is now located within the Mt. Hood Wilderness and is managed by the Zigzag Ranger District of the Mt. Hood National Forest.

== See also ==
- List of Oregon's Most Endangered Places
