= Battered corner =

The battered corner is an architectural detail in some buildings.

Old Dutch Church (Kingston, New York) and Upper Sandy Guard Station Cabin are two U.S. National Register-listed places that have them.
