= Yale Union =

Art center in Portland, Oregon, USA

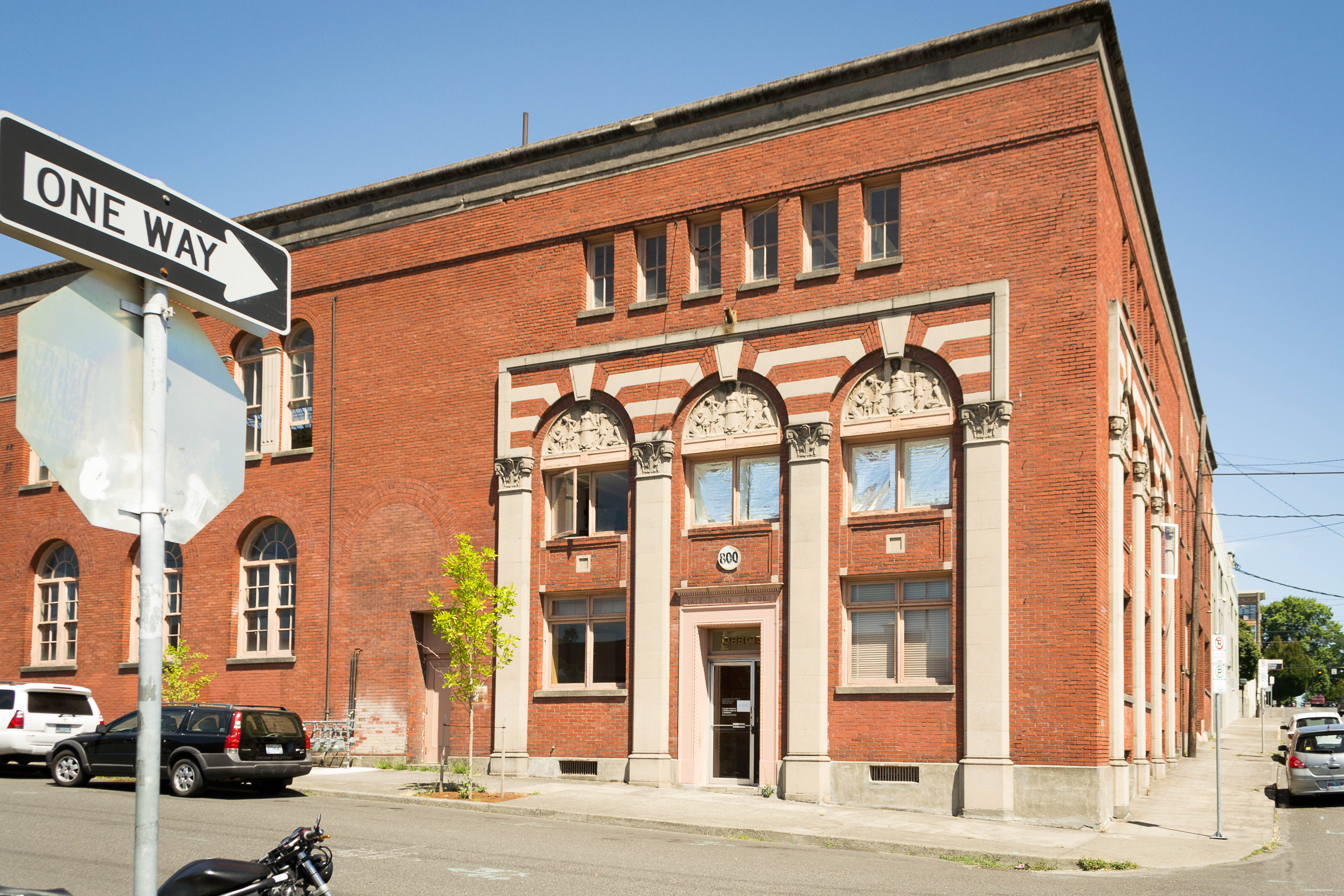
- Address: Portland, Oregon; U.S.
- Location: Yale Union Laundry Building
- Type: Non-profit contemporary art center

Construction
- Opened: 2011
- Closed: 2021

Website
- yaleunion.org

Yale Union was a nonprofit contemporary art center in southeast Portland, Oregon, United States. Located in the Yale Union Laundry Building built in 1908, the center was founded in 2008. In 2020, the organization announced it would transfer the rights of its building to the Native Arts and Cultures Foundation (NACF). It dissolved the nonprofit after wrapping up its program in 2021 and completing the building and land transfer. The space is now the Center for Native Arts and Cultures.

== Mission ==
Yale Union was a center for contemporary art in southeast Portland, Oregon. It was led by a desire to support artists, propose new modes of production, and stimulate the ongoing public discourse around art.

== History ==
Founded by Curtis Knapp and Aaron Flint Jamison, the artist-run Yale Union opened to the public on May 6, 2011 after three years of development. The organization was located in the historic Yale Union Laundry Building, purchased in 2008 for the creation of Yale Union.

== Exhibitions ==
=== PCVA ===
This exhibition, the first ever show about the history of PCVA, and was largely a display of archival documents and ephemera. Founded in 1971 by artists Jay Backstrand, Mel Katz, and Michele Russo, PCVA brought influential contemporary art to 117 NW Fifth Avenue between 1972 and 1987. Mary Beebe became the director in 1973 and during her prolific tenure exhibited Michael Asher, Allan Kaprow, John Baldessari, Vito Acconci, William Wegman, Joan Jonas, Dan Flavin, Robert Smithson, Terry Riley, Eleanor Antin, Phil Niblock, Nam Jun Paik, Robert Irwin, Meredith Monk, and Bruce Nauman, along with many Northwest artists. Many of the works, epistles, and internal documents are lent by the Portland Art Museum's Crumpacker Family Library, which has housed the PCVA archive since 1988.

The opening reception included a screening of Richard Serra's Railroad Turnbridge (1976), which was filmed at the St. Johns Railroad Bridge in Portland.

=== Saul Steinberg ===
This exhibition collected some 200 of Saul Steinberg's 1,000 published contributions to the New Yorker and other publications of note. During his lifetime, Steinberg's work was shown at the Museum of Modern Art, the Whitney Museum of American Art, and the Smithsonian Institution.

The exhibition program included a talk by Stuart Bailey of Dexter Sinister; a screening of Modern Times by Charlie Chaplin; a lecture by the exhibition coordinators Robert Snowden and Scott Ponik; a screening of The Right Way by Fischli and Weiss. The exhibition travelled in September 2012 to ARTSPACE, a nonprofit institution in Auckland, New Zealand.

=== Marianne Wex ===
From 1972 to 1977, Wex compiled an archive consisting of thousands of banal and clandestine photographs of women and men in the streets of Hamburg. She re-photographed magazines and newspapers, advertisements, art-historical reproductions, her television, whatever was in reach. She arranged the results and collaged them into large paste-up panels and a book, titled, "Let's Take Back Our Space: 'Female' and 'Male' Body Language as a Result of Patriarchal Structures (1979)." At the center of both the panels and the book is a wide disputation about how we create and present ourselves, and the degree to which gender-specific conditioning and hierarchies are reflected through everyday pose, gesture, and pre-verbal communication.

Marianne Wex was born in 1937 in Hamburg, and now lives in Höhr-Grenzhausen, Germany. She studied at the University of Fine Arts in Hamburg and taught there from 1963 to 1980. In the late 1970s and early 1980s, she showed her work in national and international solo and group exhibitions (including at NGBK Berlin, Frankfurter Kunstverein, Bonner Kunstverein, and ICA London). Wex's photo panels were shown in 2009 at Focal Point Gallery in London and in 2012 at the Badischer Kunstverein in Karlsruhe, Germany. Yale Union presents the work of Marianne Wex for the first time in the United States.

The program included a screening of Helke Sander's film The All-Around Reduced Personality (1978); a reading by Chris Kraus; a screening of Chantal Akerman's film Jeanne Dielman, 23 Quai du Commerce, 1080 Bruxelles (1975); and a talk by Avigail Moss.

=== Angie Keefer ===
On January 18, February 9, February 22, March 8, and March 22, 2013, Angie Keefer gave five different talks to a live audience.

Angie Keefer (b. 1977) graduated from Yale University in 1999. Her work has taken place at the 2012 São Paulo Biennial; MoMA, NY; Artist Space, NY; and the Kunsthal Charlottenborg, among others. In 2011, she co-founded, with David Reinfurt and Stuart Bailey, The Serving Library. The Serving Library is a long-term project that looks at how the role of the library has changed over time, from fixed archive through circulating collection to a disseminating pimple on the internet. Of course, that description is not quite right, but expression is always a compromise.

=== Anderson & Fisher ===
This exhibition consisted of a survey of films from 1964 to 2013. On March 30 and 31, 2013, Andersen and Fisher visited Portland to discuss their working relationship. On March 30, 2013, Fisher introduced a new state of Screening Room, (1968/2013), a film that can only be shown in the auditorium for which it was made.

Thom Andersen (born 1943, Chicago) is a filmmaker, film critic, and teacher. He currently teaches film theory and history at the California Institute of the Arts. He made his first film in 1964 and his latest in 2012. His films were most recently shown in the 2012 Whitney Biennial. Morgan Fisher (born in 1942, Washington, DC) teaches film at the European Graduate School. He made his first film in 1968, and his most recent in 2003. Fisher has had solo exhibitions at Portikus, Frankfurt; Raven Row, London; and the Whitney Museum of American Art.

=== Lucy Skaer ===
In July 2013, Lucy Skaer opened a show titled, "Monday 8.4.13.. Monday 22.4.13." Materials used in the exhibition included archival newsprint and twenty-two tons of lithographic limestone extracted from a site in Iowa for use in the show.

Lucy Skaer was born in Cambridge in 1975. She attended the Glasgow School of Art, receiving her BA in 1997. She has had solo exhibitions at the Chisenhale Gallery, London; Kunsthalle Basel; Kunsthalle Wien; and Location One, New York. She represented Scotland in the 52nd Venice Biennale, and she was shortlisted for the Turner Prize in 2009. Skaer lives and works in Glasgow, Scotland.

=== Susan Howe ===
For this exhibition a poem was commissioned, printed, and exhibited in its printed form. The work, titled, "TTT," was also performed by the artist, and accompanied by a lecture.

Susan Howe was born in 1937. This is her first solo exhibition. Apart from her poetry, she is the author of two landmark books of literary criticism, My Emily Dickinson and The Birth-mark: Unsettling the Wilderness in American Literary History, and three records with David Grubbs. Howe received the 2011 Bollingen Prize for American Poetry and a Guggenheim Fellowship. She has been a Stanford Institute for Humanities Distinguished Fellow, as well as an Anna-Maria Kellen Fellow at the American Academy in Berlin. She taught for many years at the State University of New York-Buffalo. She lives in Guilford, Connecticut.

Tom Tit Tot was co-curated by Robert Snowden and Andrea Andersson. Andersson has taught at Columbia, Barnard, and New York University. A curator, she writes primarily on 20th and early 21st century experimental writing with a particular focus on the relationship between visual, sound, and language arts. Most recently she arranged a survey exhibition entitled Postscript: Writing After Conceptual Art.

=== George Kuchar ===
George Kuchar was an American Video_art and underground film Film director, known for his "low-fi" aesthetic. Yale Union has been showing Kuchar's films and videos since 2008.

"Although Kuchar was unknown to Susan Sontag at the time she wrote Notes on "Camp" (1964), she could have been referring to his no-budget pictures with her general description of camp as being 'serious about the frivolous, frivolous about the serious. The essence of camp is its love of the unnatural: of artifice and exaggeration. Camp sees everything in quotation marks. The ultimate camp statement is it's good because it's awful.'"

In an interview from 2009 George Kuchar said, "Makin' pictures, see, sometimes you see a very beautiful person. And the first thing that comes to my mind is, I want to make a movie of that person. 'Cause I like puttin' gauzes—ah, cheap, black cloth on the lens with a rubber band—and creating these, what look like 1940s movies, or movies of a beautiful Hollywood style, and blowing these people up bigger than life and making them into gods and goddesses. And I think in the movies that's a wonderful way of pushing them on the public, and infusing the public with great objects of desire, and dreams, and things of great beauty… living human beings of beauty."

=== Terry Atkinson ===
This exhibition consisted of multiple material, formal, and textual elements. Sometimes these elements appeared autonomously, assuming the familiar form of a didactic, painting, drawing, or even minimal sculpture, and in other instances these elements were combined on one surface, or appended to each other.

Terry Atkinson was born in 1939. He lives in Leamington Spa, England with his wife, artist Sue Atkinson, with whom he has frequently collaborated. The exhibition was curated by Richard Birkett. Birkett is curator at Artists Space, NY. It is Atkinson's first institutional solo show in the United States.
