= Wong Laundry Building =

Building in Portland, Oregon, U.S.

- Interactive map of the Wong Laundry Building area

General information
- Location: Portland, Oregon, United States
- Coordinates: 45.52503°N 122.67372°W

The Wong Laundry Building is an historic building in Portland, Oregon's Old Town Chinatown neighborhood, United States. It is listed on the National Register of Historic Places (NRHP) as part of the Portland New Chinatown/Japantown Historic District.

The two-story structure was completed in 1908, and sold in 2016. It was named one of Oregon's Most Endangered Places.

== See also ==
- List of Oregon's Most Endangered Places
- Troy Laundry Building (Portland, Oregon)
- Yale Union Laundry Building
