= Jantzen Beach Amusement Park =

Former amusement park in Portland, Oregon

Coordinates: 45.613°N 122.682°W

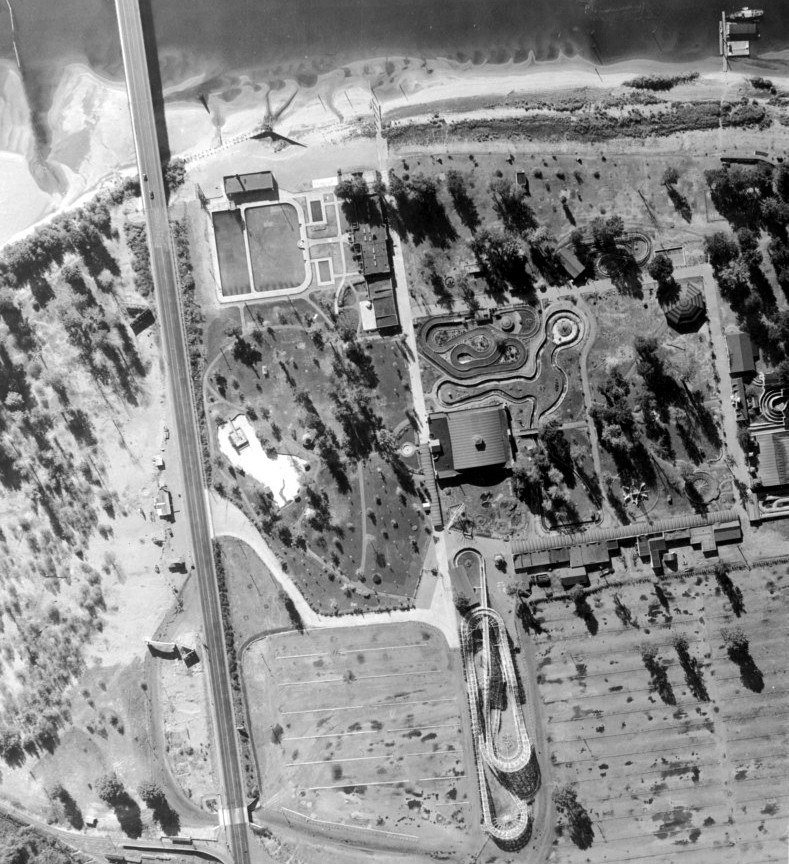
Jantzen Beach Amusement Park photographed in 1936

Jantzen Beach Amusement Park was a popular amusement park from 1928 to 1970 in Portland, Oregon, on Hayden Island in the middle of the Columbia River. "The Coney Island of the West" opened on May 26, 1928, as the largest amusement park in the nation, covering over 123 acres (50 ha) at the northern tip of Portland.

== History ==
In 1927, William A. Logus and Leo F. Smith purchased 40 acres (16 ha) of land on Hayden Island from the Portland Electric Power Company (a predecessor of Portland General Electric). Logus and Smith headed the Hayden Island Amusement Company and they built an amusement resort and tourist park named Jantzen Beach Amusement Park for one of the park's investors, Carl Jantzen, of Jantzen swimsuit fame. The door opened to the public on May 26, 1928. It surpassed all attendance expectations; over 30 million people patronized the park throughout its 42 years.

On opening day, Saturday, May 26, 1928, 15,000 people paid the $0.10 admission. The following day, 25,000 people came out to the park. The amusement park included a merry-go-round, fun house, Big Dipper roller coaster, Golden Canopy Ballroom, four swimming pools, a natatorium, 25 acres (10 ha) of picnic grounds, and 15 acres (6.1 ha) of parking.

The C.W. Parker carousel, built in 1921, was moved to Jantzen Beach in 1927. Some of the hand-carved horses were made by inmates of the United States Penitentiary in Leavenworth, Kansas. The amusement park's popularity peaked during the 1940s.

In the late 1950s, attendance declined while the commercial value of the land increased. The park closed on Labor Day, 1970. The pumping system from the swimming pools remains installed, and is used to pump drinking water to the residents of Hayden Island. The Jantzen Beach Carousel, also known as the C.W. Parker Four-Row Park Carousel, was installed inside the Jantzen Beach Mall, a shopping mall located on the grounds formerly occupied by the park, and it operated there from 1972 to 2012. However, it was removed in 2012 for the reconstruction of the shopping center, and it remains in storage as of 2016. The carousel was added to the National Register of Historic Places in 1987 but was removed in 2008.

== Attractions ==
- Big Dipper — wooden roller coaster (May 26, 1928 – 1969)
- Kiddie Dipper — steel roller coaster (1947–1970)
- Golden Canopy Ballroom
- The Jantzen Beach Carousel
- Natatorium
- Picnic grounds
- Two robot circus criers, "Laffing Sal" and "Joe Barker"
- Venetian Canal ride
- Jantzen Beach Railway
- Fun House
- Elbow Room Restaurant
- Midway
- Buzzer
- Roll-O-Planes
- Ferris Wheel
- Haunted house

== See also ==
- Oaks Amusement Park
- Lotus Isle
