= Yale Union Laundry Building =

Historic building in Portland, Oregon, U.S.

- U.S. National Register of Historic Places
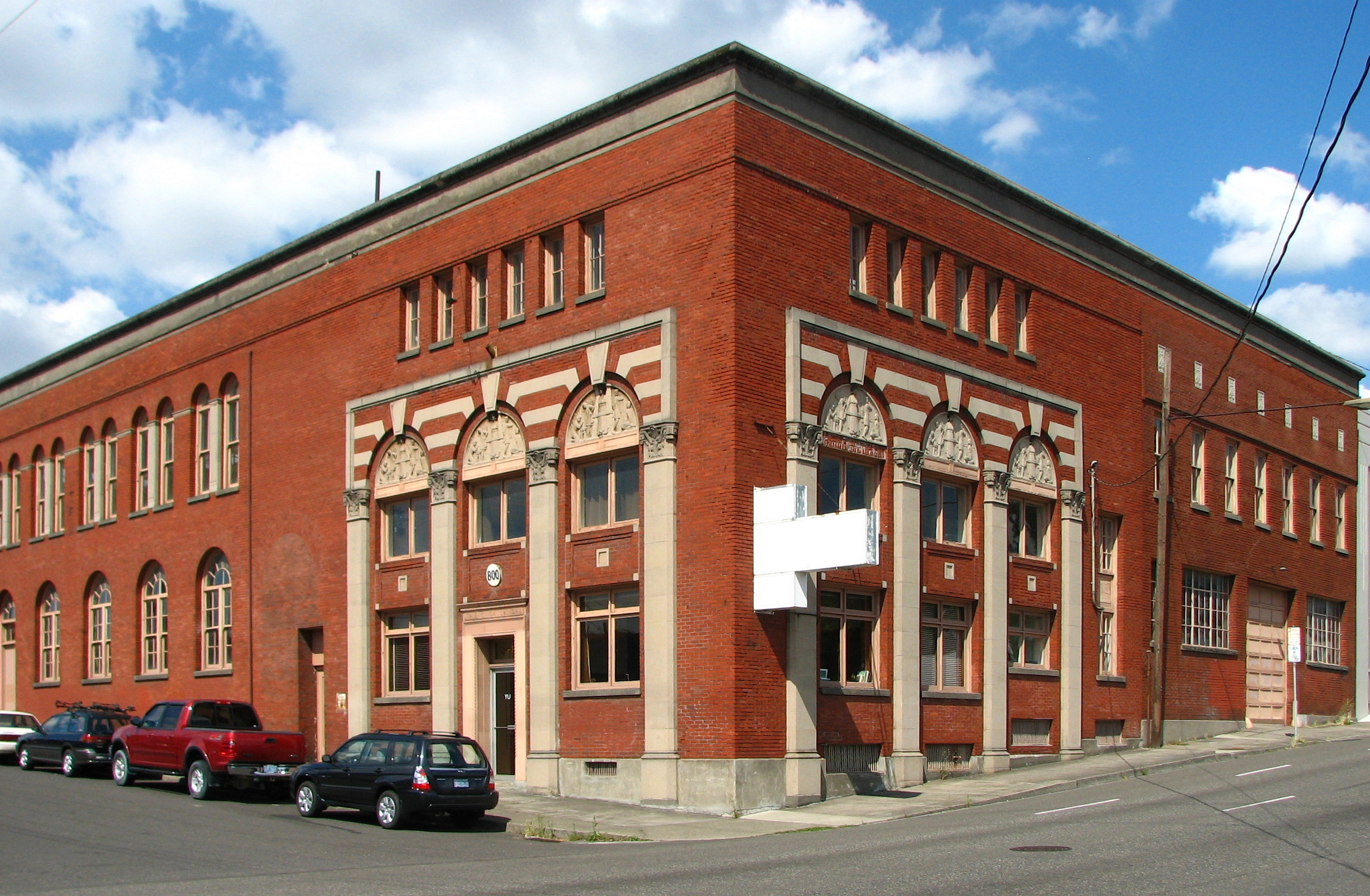
- The building's exterior in 2009

- Location within Portland, Oregon Location within Oregon Location within the United States
- Location: 800 SE 10th Avenue; Portland, Oregon
- Coordinates: 45°31′01″N 122°39′20″W
- Area: 0.43 acres (0.17 ha) (lot size)
- Built: 1908
- Architectural style: Italian Revival and Egyptian Revival
- NRHP reference No.: 07000759
- Added to NRHP: July 19, 2007

The Yale Union Laundry Building, also known as the Yale Laundry Building, the City Linen Supply Co. Building, Perfect Fit Manufacturing and simply Yale Union (YU), in southeast Portland, Oregon, is a two-story commercial structure listed on the National Register of Historic Places. Built largely of brick in 1908, and embellished with Italian Revival and Egyptian Revival decorations, it was added to the register in 2007. Two-story additions in 1927 and 1929 changed the original building into an L-shaped structure that shares a party wall with a building to the east.

Preservation of elements of Portland's industrial laundry era, and its relation to the women's labor movement and the rise of the middle class in the United States, are factors in the building's listing on the National Register. Built and first operated by businessman Charles F. Brown, the building was bought in 1927 by Home Services Company, a power-laundry consortium. American Linen Supply and then Perfect Fit Manufacturing, a maker of automotive fabrics, used the building after Home Services sold it in 1950. Acquired by Alter LLC in 2008, the building is home to Yale Union (YU), a contemporary arts center.

== Description ==
Located at 800 Southeast 10th Avenue, the building occupies the west half of the block between Southeast Belmont and Southeast Morrison streets. The southwest corner entry features a stylized Egyptian temple of cast stone. Italianate Renaissance influence is seen in the ground floor's large arched windows and tall narrow windows on the second. The west facade is lined with banks of large windows that helped illuminate and cool the work areas. Other important exterior features include a large garage door along Belmont Street, and a paved parking lot and water-tower pedestal on the Morrison Street side.

The original building's main floor has vaulted ceilings, large windows, brick walls, a flat roof, and wooden cross beams. The mezzanine consists of three rooms. The second floor has large windows and vaulted ceilings, restrooms, and a lunchroom. Stairs and elevators connect the levels, including the basement and its boiler room. A lobby and office in the southwest corner of the main floor can be entered from inside or via the original main door off Southeast 10th Avenue.

Following purchase in 2008, renovations began to convert the building into a contemporary arts center. Architects designed gallery spaces, a bookstore and cafe, a 100-seat room, library and kitchen. Geothermal heating supplied by an aquifer underneath the building will contribute to the goal of LEED Platinum status.

== History ==
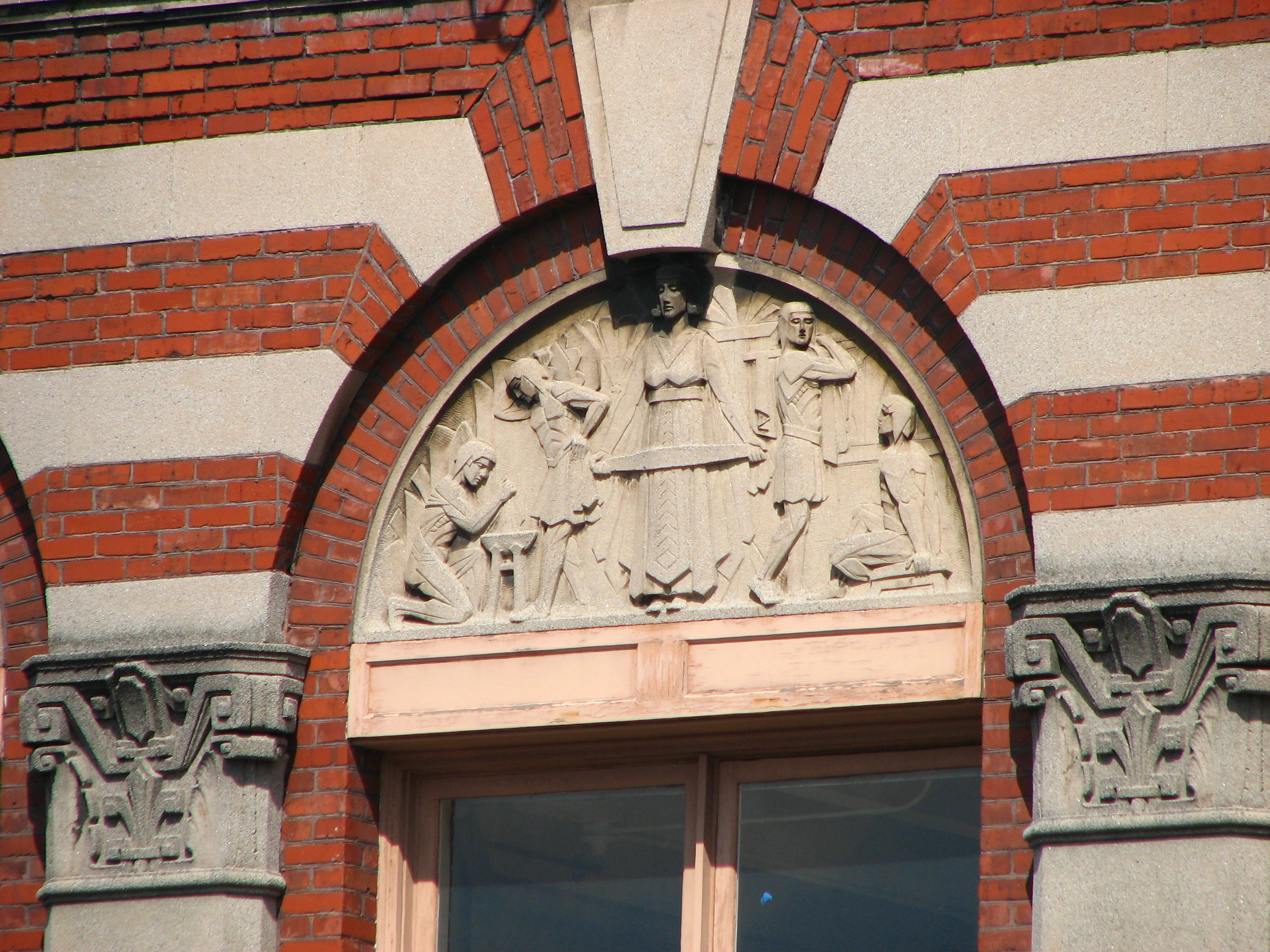
Egyptian Revival detail of the Yale Union Laundry Building in 2009

The Yale Union Laundry Building was built to house a commercial laundry during an era, roughly 1900 to 1950, when many urban U.S. households sent out their laundry for cleaning rather than doing it at home. Before the invention of the steam laundry machine in the mid-19th century, women did most domestic washing at home using simple machines such as scrub boards, wooden tubs, and clothes lines. Steam-driven washing machines, and equipment for starching, ironing, and related tasks made industrial laundries feasible by the turn of the century.

In 1908, Charles F. Brown, who entered the laundry business in the Midwest in 1892, moved to Portland to build the Yale Laundry Building, and to operate an industrial power laundry on its premises. The building's basement contained boilers to heat wash water, and the main part of the first floor had beams capable of supporting heavy washing machines. The first and second floors had large windows to admit light and to release heat and steam. At the time of the building's construction, Portland had 68 commercial laundries of varied types and sizes. By 1916, the Yale Laundry, one of the larger laundries, employed 125 people, many of whom were women.

Federal and state laws regulating hours, wages, and working conditions changed markedly in the United States during the early 20th century. The state's Industrial Welfare Commission, established in 1913, ruled in 1914 that women could not work in laundries for more than 54 hours a week, and that work days were not to exceed nine hours. The commission established a minimum weekly wage of $8.25 for women working in Portland's laundries. By 1917, the work day was reduced to an eight-hour maximum. In 1920, to lower costs related to regulations and the rise of organized labor, several industrial laundries in Portland combined to form the Home Services Company. The new company lowered overhead by sharing resources, and added a pickup and delivery service popular among middle-class families. The company acquired the Yale Union Laundry in 1927.

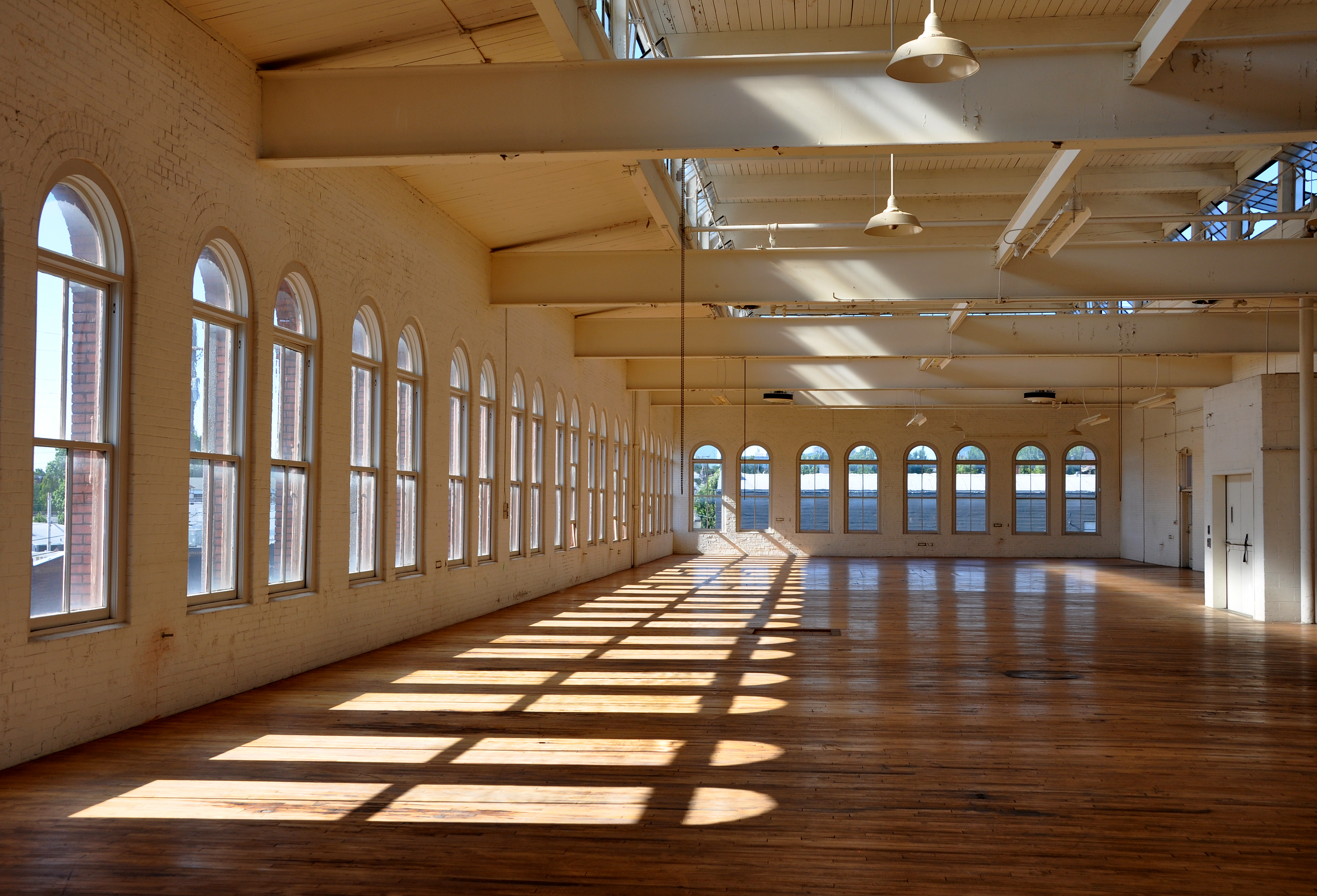
Northwest second-floor interior, 2011

By 1931, more than 80 percent of the services offered by industrial laundries were sold to individual families. However, as the Great Depression continued, many people could no longer afford the services, and business declined. The decline continued after World War II when electric washers and dryers meant for home use became affordable to a large percentage of the populace. As individual customers disappeared, factory laundries turned to specialized services such as washing diapers or linens. In 1950, the American Linen Supply Company bought the Yale Laundry Company. In 1959, Perfect Fit Manufacturing began to use the building to make auto seat covers, tire covers, and other automotive fabrics. Perfect Fit remained in the building through 2006.

The building housed Yale Union (YU), a contemporary arts center from 2008 to 2021. Alter LLC, associated with the Monfort Family Foundation, purchased the building for $3.5 million and intended to fund renovations and operations until the arts center generated revenue on its own. Renovations costing an additional $7.2 million, also funded by Alter, included a bookstore and cafe, and a 100-seat room. The center was officially unveiled in November 2010 with a renovated kitchen and additional improvements planned. More than 600 people attended YU's first public exhibit in May 2011.

The Native Arts and Cultures Foundation, which Willamette Week has described as the "first and only nonprofit in the U.S. dedicated exclusively to funding Native art and culture", took over the building's ownership in 2020. Their first exhibition was held in 2022.

== See also ==
- National Register of Historic Places listings in Southeast Portland, Oregon
- Troy Laundry Building (Portland, Oregon)
- Wong Laundry Building
