= Jantzen Beach Center =

Shopping mall in Portland, Oregon, United States

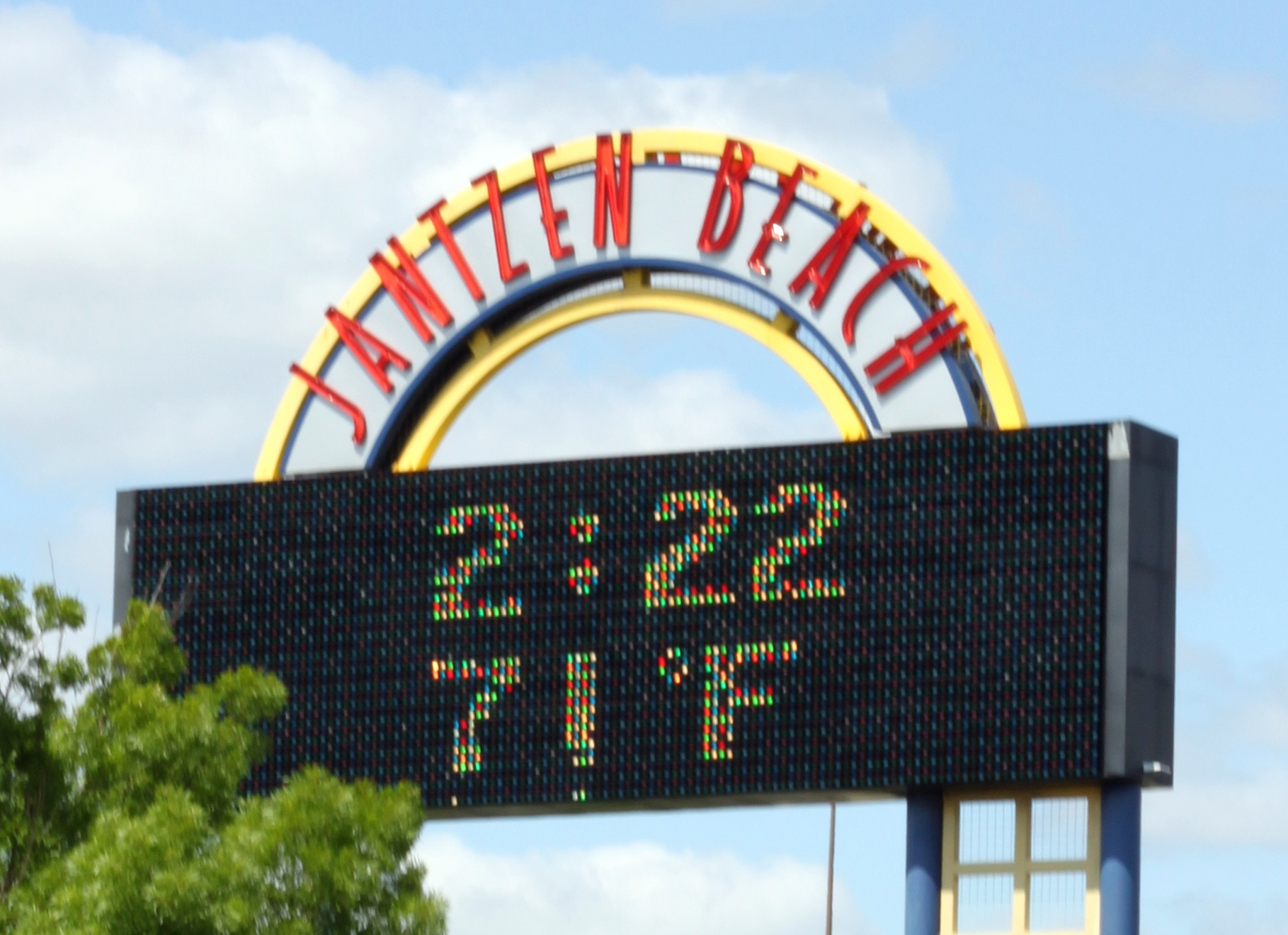
- Jantzen Beach sign
- Location: Portland, Oregon
- Coordinates: 45.612°N 122.683°W
- Address: 1405 Jantzen Beach Center
- Opened: September 28, 1972; 54 years ago (original indoor mall) 2012 (Current outdoor shopping center)
- Closed: 2012 (original indoor mall)
- Developer: Hayden Island Inc.
- Owner: Kimco Realty (2017–)
- Num. of stores: 30+
- Num. of anchor tenants: 3
- Floors: 1

Jantzen Beach Center is an outdoor shopping mall located in Portland, Oregon, on Hayden Island in the Columbia River, known as Jantzen Beach SuperCenter from 1996 until about 2012. Opened in 1972 as an indoor mall, sometimes known informally as Jantzen Beach Mall, it was largely torn down in 1995–96 for big box development. The remaining enclosed portion included Ross Dress for Less, Burlington Coat Factory and Target as its anchor stores until April 2012, when renovation work began. A new one-story Target store was constructed on the property over the site of a former Barnes & Noble bookstore and restaurant, opening in October 2012.

== History ==
Jantzen Beach Center opened September 28, 1972, on the site of the former Jantzen Beach Amusement Park which operated from 1928 to 1970. The C. W. Parker carousel, built in 1921, is the only surviving ride from the amusement park and was located inside the mall by the food court until 2012. One of the mall's early anchor stores, a 60,000-square-foot (5,600 m^{2}) Liberty House which was that chain's first store in the Portland area, opened in November 1973. An 84,000-square-foot (7,800 m^{2}) Kmart store was added in 1977. The Liberty House store later operated as Frederick & Nelson from 1979 until 1984, The Crescent until 1988 and Lamonts from then until 1994.

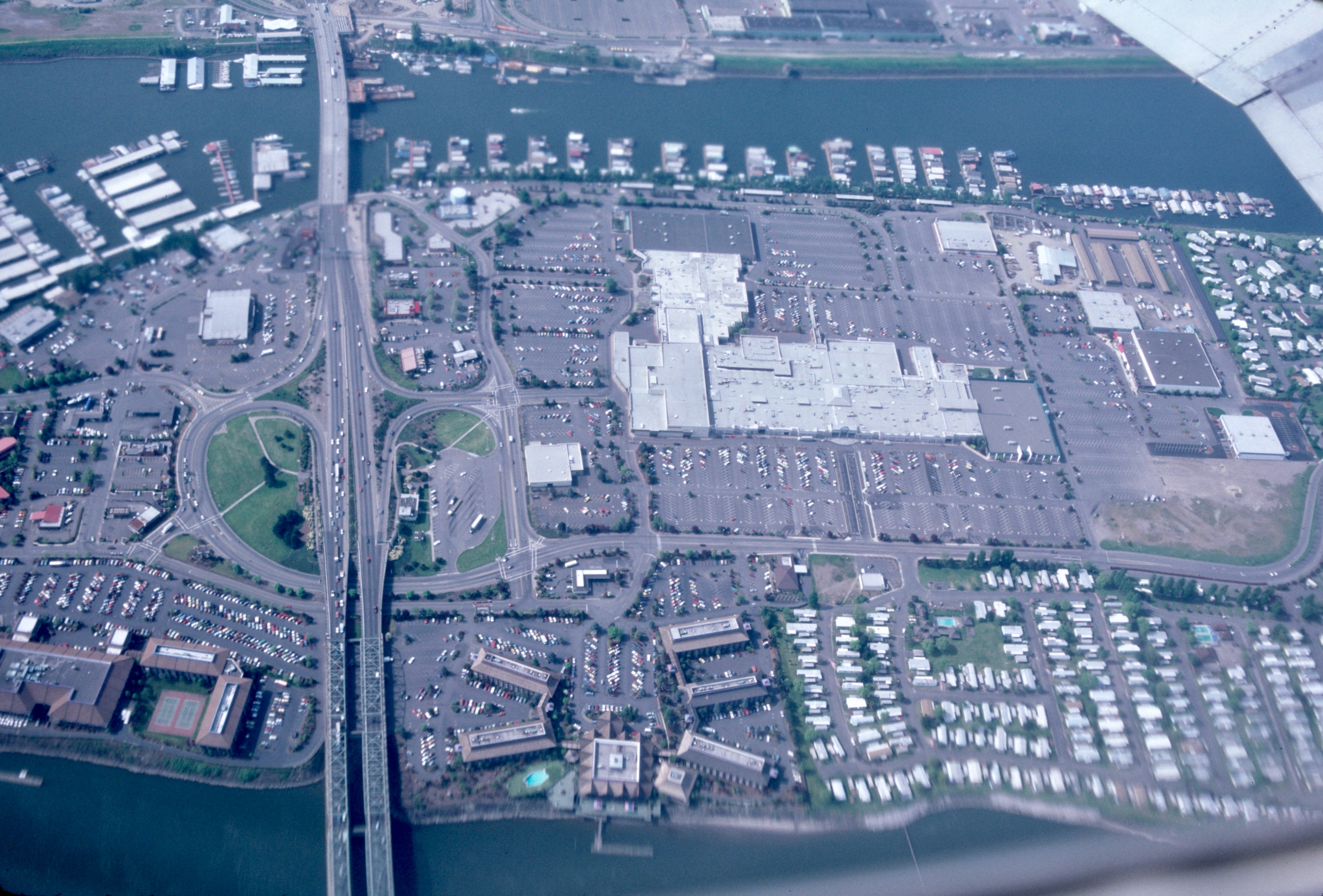
Aerial view in 1987 (looking south), when Jantzen Beach Center was still an enclosed mall

In 1995, MBK Northwest acquired Jantzen Beach Center for about $18 million. About two-thirds of the mall was demolished in 1995 and 1996 including the former Lamonts wing, a cinema and around 150 small stores to make room for big box development which includes The Home Depot, Barnes & Noble and Toys "R" Us. The east wing of the mall was left intact with three anchor stores and a newly created food court. These renovations cost $38 million and expanded the center to 800,000 square feet (74,000 m^{2}) as well giving it the name of Jantzen Beach SuperCenter.

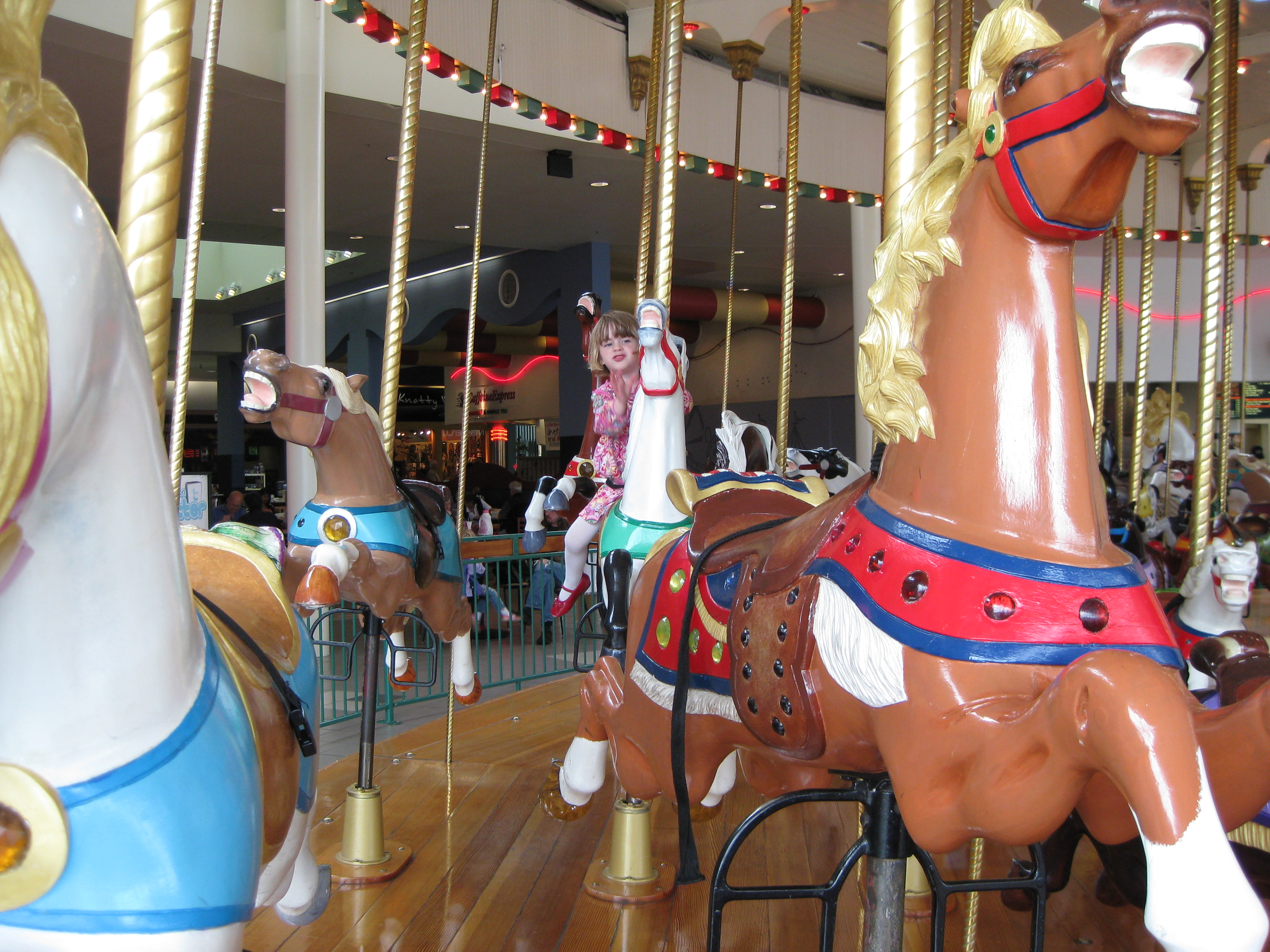
The historic C. W. Parker Four-Row Park Carousel from the former amusement park operated inside the mall from 1972 to 2012.

In December 1996, MBK Northwest sold the 70-acre (28 ha) center for $76 million to a Michigan-based pension fund that Compass Retail, Inc. advised on the sale. The mall features approximately 30 tenants, including three anchor stores: Burlington Coat Factory, Ross Dress for Less and Target. The Target building was previously occupied by Montgomery Ward until 2001, and the Burlington Coat Factory store had replaced the Kmart, which closed in 2003.

The mall's owners announced further renovation plans in July 2010. Preliminary redevelopment plans would include the demolition of the remaining enclosed portion, as well as the area around the existing Barnes & Noble store. On August 23, 2011, Barnes & Noble and Starbucks both announced that they would be shuttering their stores for good by September 2, 2011. The owners of the Jantzen Beach SuperCenter, Jantzen Dynamic Corporation, also announced that a free-standing Target would be going in at the former Barnes & Noble site, and that the then-existing Target store and adjacent wing of the mall would be permanently demolished. In April 2012, center managers Edens & Avant Realty Inc. announced $50 million in renovations that would begin that month and finish by the middle of 2013.

By the time of the 2012 renovations, the mall's name had changed back to Jantzen Beach Center. The new Target store opened in October 2012.

The renovations were to include the vintage carousel, but by June 2015, long after completion of the work on the mall, the carousel had not been returned, but remains in storage in a building on the shopping center property.

By 2017, the mall's owner was the State of Michigan Retirement System fund, but in July 2017 it was sold by that entity, being advised by Edens, to Kimco Realty, of New York.

== See also ==
- List of shopping malls in Oregon
