= Marianne Wex =

- Born: July 13, 1937; Hamburg, Germany
- Died: October 13, 2020; Schleswig-Holstein
- Education: Hochschule für bildende Künste Hamburg
- Alma mater: Hochschule für bildende Künste Hamburg
- Notable work: "Let's Take Back our Space": 'Female' and 'Male' Body Language
- Style: Conceptualism
- Website: www.marianne-wex.de

Marianne Wex (13 July 1937 in Hamburg – 13 October 2020 in Schleswig-Holstein) was a German feminist photographer, author and self-healer.

== Life and work ==
Wex studied fine arts at the Academies of Art Hamburg and Mexico City.

An image from Marianne Wex's work "Let's Take Back our Space"

Between 1963 and 1980, Marianne Wex worked as an art academy lecturer in Hamburg. Her interests in feminism, mass media, sociology and healing determine the form of her work, which conceptually utilizes signs, symbols and color over a variety of media: painting, photography, typography and calligraphy.

During the 1970s Wex commenced investigations of what she perceived as unconscious "female" and "male" body languages. Her research culminated in her 1977 artwork: ‘Weibliche’ und ‘männliche’ Körpersprache als Folge patriarchalischer Machtverhältnisse (Let's Take Back Our Space: 'Female' and 'Male' Body Language as a Result of Patriarchal Structures).

Living in Hamburg between 1972 and 1977, Wex took more than 5,000 photographs of women and men, most of them in the streets of Hamburg and nearby. These images illustrated her observation of vastly different body language between the two genders. Wex's own photographs were complemented with images taken from mass media (advertisements, films, tabloids magazines and newspapers).

Further, Wex examined and photographed sculptures dating back to 2,000 B.C., finding that idealized body postures and body forms for women and men were far more divergent in the present than historically. Wex incorporated these historical examples into her work. The resulting artwork comprises over 200 panels featuring the photographs arranged into different categories of pose.

Since then, the artwork has been exhibited globally and is regarded as a pioneering work of feminist art. The resulting publication about the artwork has been translated into English and French and the project is still used as an important example in women's and gender studies. The FrauenMediaTurm documents the piece in his chronicle of the New Women's Movement.

In the 1980s, after her diagnosis, Wex left Germany, turning away from art to travel through New Zealand, India, Japan and Canada, where she became interested in self-healing. She then traveled to London to study under Lily Cornford. After studying with Cornford, Wex began teaching seminars and classes on self-healing to women.

== Exhibitions ==
- 2026-2027: Taking Back Our Space: Photographic Perspectives, Museum of Modern Art, New York, New York
- 2018: Tanya Leighton Gallery, Berlin.
- 2017: At the Archiv, Zurick, Switzerland.
- 2017: Zachęta - National Gallery of Art, Poland, Warsaw.
- 2016: Adam Art Gallery, Victoria University, Wellington New Zealand.
- 2015: Frauengesundheitszentrum Sirona e.V., Wiesbaden.
- 2014: Autocenter, Space for Contemporary Art, Berlin.
- 2014: Gasworks Gallery, London.
- 2013: La Gallerie, Noisy-le-Sec, Paris.
- 2013: Presentation House Gallery, Vancouver, Kanada.
- 2012: Yale Union (YU), Center for Contemporary Art, Portland, USA.
- 2012: Badischer Kunstverein, Karlsruhe.
- 2009: Focal Point Gallery, London, Southend-on-Sea, curated by Prof Mike Sperlinger.
- 2005: HfBK-Galerie, Hamburg, curated by bildwechsel, Chris Regn
- 1982: Institute of Contemporary Arts, London.
- 1979: Bonner Kunstverein, Bonn.
- 1977: Frankfurter Kunstverein, Frankfurt a.M.
- 1977: First exhibition of the photographical work ‚Let's Take Back Our Space', "Female" and "Male" Body Language as a Result of Patriarchal Structures at the NGBK, New Society for Fine Art, Berlin. That in connection with the Exhibition ‚Women Artists International 1877-1977' at the Charlottenberger Schloss, Berlin.
- 1976: Center for Communication, Paintings, Schalom, Hamburg.

== Bibliography ==
- Let's Take Back Our Space: Female and Male Body Language as a Result of Patriarchal Structures (Frauenliteratur Verlag, 1984, ISBN 3-923173-00-8, originally published as "Weibliche" und "männliche" Körpersprache als Folge patriarchalischer Machtverhältnisse in 1979)
- Parthenogenese Heute.Von der Urkraft der Frau aus sich selbst heraus zu gebären, ohne Beteiligung eines zweiten Geschlechtes (Verlag Anke Schäfer, Wiesbaden, 1992)
- "Menschliche Parthenogenese" in Lachesis, Fachzeitschrift des Berufsverbandes für Heilpraktikerinnen (2002)

== Publications ==
- 2003: Book, Italian: 'Parthenogenesi Oggi', 4th expanded edition, Publisher Vega, Edizioni Lilaurora, Morano, Sovicille. ISBN 88-88-508-01-5
- 2002: German, Article, ‚Menschliche Parthenogenese', Lachesis, Fachzeitschrift des Berufsverbandes für Heilpraktikerinnen.
- 1996: Book, Japanese: ‚Parthenogenesis Today', 3rd expanded edition, Publisher: Pandora Co. LTD, Rie Nakano, Tokyo, Japan.
- 1996: Book, German: ‚Parthenogenese Heute' Von der Urkraft der Frau aus sich selbst heraus zu gebären, ohne Beteiligung eines zweiten Geschlechtes', second expended edition (3.-8.Tausend)‚edition frauenmuseum wiesbaden', ISBN 3-9805380-0-1.
- 1993: Book, French: ‚Language «féminin» et «masculin» du corps: reflet de l'ordre patriarcal'. With 2037 Photographs, Publisher, Academia-Erasme, ISBN 2-87209-284-6.
- 1992: Book, German: ‚Parthenogenese Heute' Von der Urkraft der Frau aus sich selbst heraus zu gebären, ohne Beteiligung eines zweiten Geschlechtes'. First Publikation, Anke Schäfer, Wiesbaden.
- 1984: Book, English: ‚Let's Take Back Our Space', "Female" and "Male" Body Language as a Result of Patriarchal Structures. with 2037 photographs, Publisher, Frauenliteratur Verlag,ISBN 3-923173-00-8.
- 1979: Book, German: "Weibliche" und "männliche" Körpersprache als Folge patriarchalischer Machtverhältnisse. With 2037 Photographs, Self-Publishing, DNB 810112299.
- 1967: Book, German: in 6 single Chapters: Lettering/Calligrafie in der Geschichte der Schrift in Bildern und Anwendungen. Publisher, Walter Schulz KG, HFL Hamburg.
