= Troy Laundry Building (Portland, Oregon) =

Historic building in Portland, Oregon, U.S.

- U.S. National Register of Historic Places
- Portland Historic Landmark
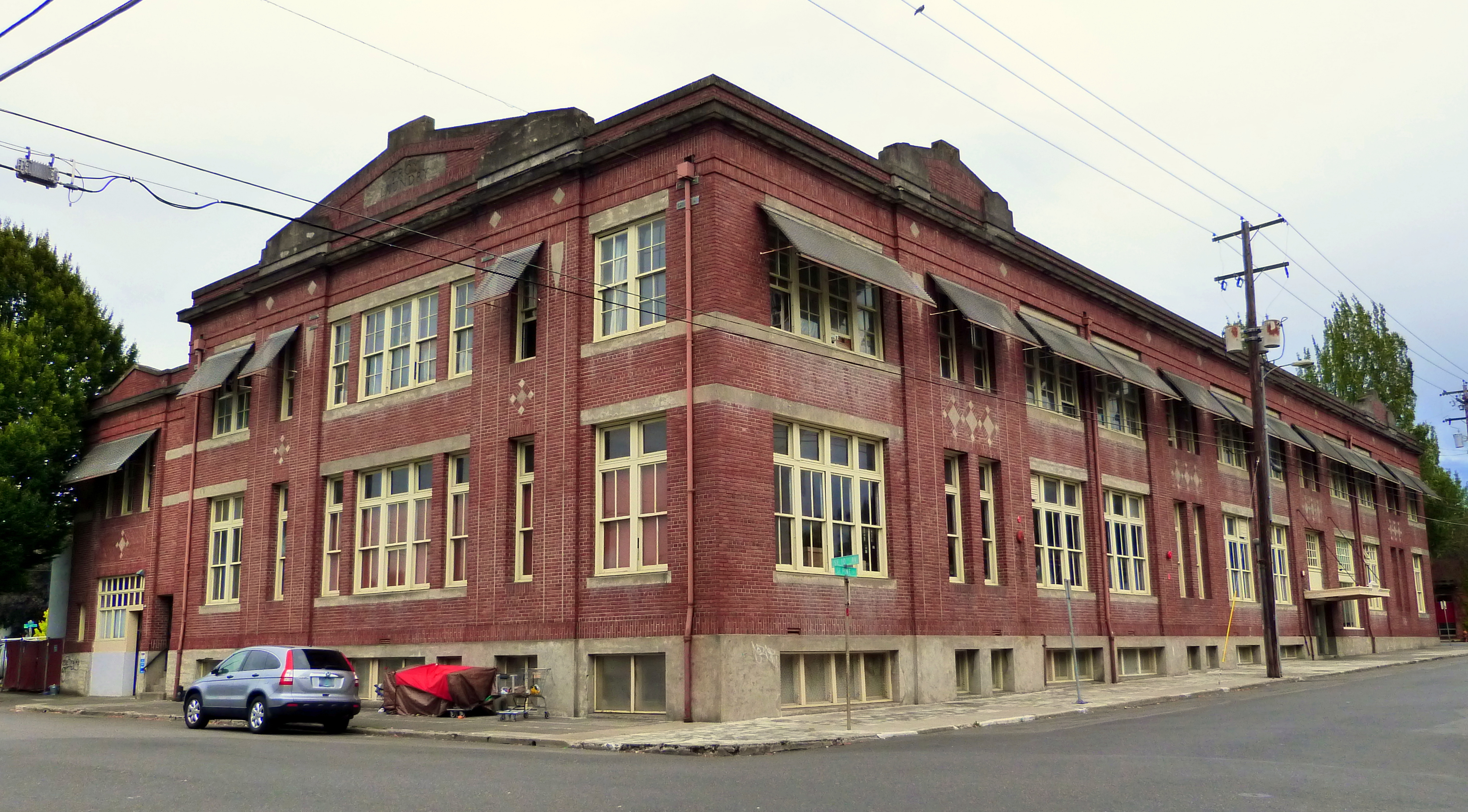
- The Troy Laundry Building in 2013
- Location: 1025 SE Pine Street; Portland, Oregon
- Coordinates: 45°31′15″N 122°39′19″W
- Built: 1913
- Architect: Ellis F. Lawrence
- Architectural style: Colonial Revival
- MPS: Portland Oregon’s Eastside Historic and Architectural Resources, 1850-1938
- NRHP reference No.: 89000102
- Added to NRHP: March 8, 1989

The Troy Laundry Building, is an historic building located at 1025 Southeast Pine St. in Portland, Oregon. It was designed by Ellis F. Lawrence in the early 1900s. It is considered a mixture of Colonial, Egyptian, and Renaissance Revival architecture. It is known for its large windows, tall brick walls, and decorative brickwork.

== Architecture ==
While the Troy Laundry Building is classified as Colonial Revival, it also features some characteristics of other architectural styles. The towering brickwork with the tall, double-layered windows and the decorative brickwork at even intervals underscore the mixed architectural styles. The building also has hints of Renaissance Revival architecture, which drew inspiration from a wide range of classical Italian styles.

Egyptian Revival architecture is also present in the building, as it also incorporates motifs and imagery from ancient Egypt. In addition, the building's high stone walls and angular wall faces and design attributes in the upper portions of the building are central to this style.

The building also has elements of Colonial Revival architecture, as shown by the angular brickwork, small stacked windows, and symmetrical features. Colonial Revival style is often associated with Centennial Exhibitions, which reawakened Americans to the architectural traditions of their colonial past.

== History ==
=== The Troy Laundry Company ===
The Troy Laundry was established in 1889 by John F. Tait, who came to Portland, Oregon, from Scotland, where he had apprenticed in the laundry trade. His knowledge of the business and his well-respected management skills led to the establishment of a successful, long-running laundry business.

The original Troy Laundry building was located on the west side of the Willamette River, but was destroyed by a fire. After the fire, Mr. Tait moved the laundry into a building on the east side of town.

In 1892, he ran advertisements for the laundry, which showed how large his operation had become. Tait has set up additional locations throughout Portland, as well as Vancouver and Oregon City, where laundry could be picked up. Troy Laundry became one of the two largest laundries in the city and catered to both commercial and residential clients. Within 25 years of its establishment, Tait has over 150 people working for the laundry. A pioneer in the industry, Tait was one of the first people in the laundry industry to switch to an eight-hour work day.

By 1913, the laundry had outgrown its earlier building, and a new Troy Laundry building was built at the corner of 10th and Pine St. The new building incorporated a variety of innovative features, including a large employee dining room and lounge, its own electrical generators, new engines that ran 44 washers, and 22 extractors. The new building also had standard oil burner dryers, steam equipment, and drying systems, including a tumbler – technologies that were evolutionary for their time.

The Troy Laundry company eventually had a customer base that included 10,000 residential, industrial, and commercial clients, generating $600,000 in revenue per week.

=== Ellis F. Lawrence ===
Architect Ellis F. Lawrence was born in Malden, Massachusetts, in 1879. He received both his bachelor's and master's degrees in architecture from the Massachusetts Institute of Technology, which was the first school of architecture in the United States. After graduating in 1902, Lawrence worked for three architectural firms: Codman and Despradelle; Andrews, Jaques & Rantoul; and John Calvin Stevens. Lawrence was greatly influenced by his experience working for Despradelle, as well as by his former studio instructor John Calvin Stevens.

In 1906, Lawrence headed west where he intended to open an office in San Francisco. He stopped in Portland along the way to visit a friend and former M.I.T graduate. Scrapping his plan to move to San Francisco, Lawrence decided to remain in Portland. He soon joined his friend E. B. McNaughton and engineer Henry Raymond in partnership in November 1906. Lawrence became the firm's chief designer. In February 1910, he left the firm to pursue independent work until 1913 when a former classmate and friend from M.I.T. William G. Holdford joined him in a new partnership. Ormond Bean and Fred Allyn eventually joined the team in 1928. Bean left the firm in 1933, and both Allyn and Holdford left in 1940.

Lawrence's first design in Portland was his home, which was located in the Irvington neighborhood of Northeast Portland. In 1914, he founded the University of Oregon School of Architecture and Allied Arts in Eugene, Oregon. He organized the school around teaching methods that rejected the traditional philosophy. Lawrence believed in the integration of all the arts. He eventually became acquainted with many of the Portland's most influential businessmen, including John Tait. He also became friends with Frank Lloyd Wright and the Olmstead brothers.

== See also ==
- National Register of Historic Places listings in Southeast Portland, Oregon
- Wong Laundry Building
- Yale Union Laundry Building
