= Taylor–Mayo House =

Historic house in Virginia, United States

- U.S. National Register of Historic Places
- Virginia Landmarks Register
- Richmond City Historic District
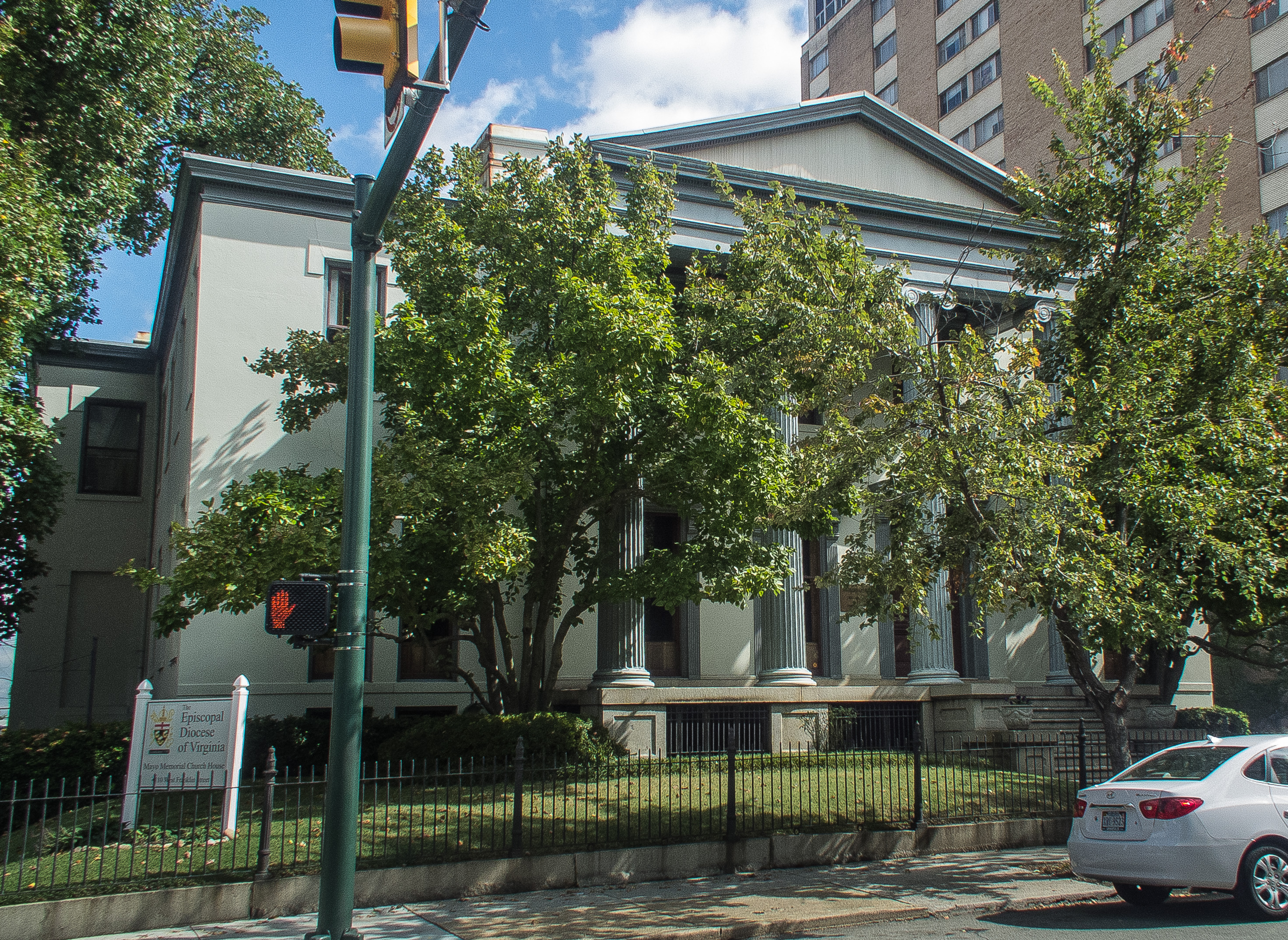
- Taylor–Mayo House, September 2013

- Location within Virginia Location within the United States
- Location: 110 W. Franklin St., Richmond, Virginia
- Coordinates: 37°32′42″N 77°26′43″W
- Area: 9.9 acres (4.0 ha)
- Built: 1845
- Architectural style: Greek Revival
- NRHP reference No.: 73002221
- VLR No.: 127-0075

Significant dates
- Added to NRHP: April 2, 1973
- Designated VLR: May 16, 1972

The Taylor–Mayo House, also known as the Mayo Memorial Church House, is a historic home located in Richmond, Virginia. It was built in 1845, and is a two-story, five-bay, Greek Revival style dwelling topped by a hipped roof. The front facade features a three-bay two-story Ionic order portico. The house was elaborately renovated during the 1880s.

It was listed on the National Register of Historic Places in 1973.
