= Cochran Farm =

Historic house in Ohio, United States

- U.S. National Register of Historic Places
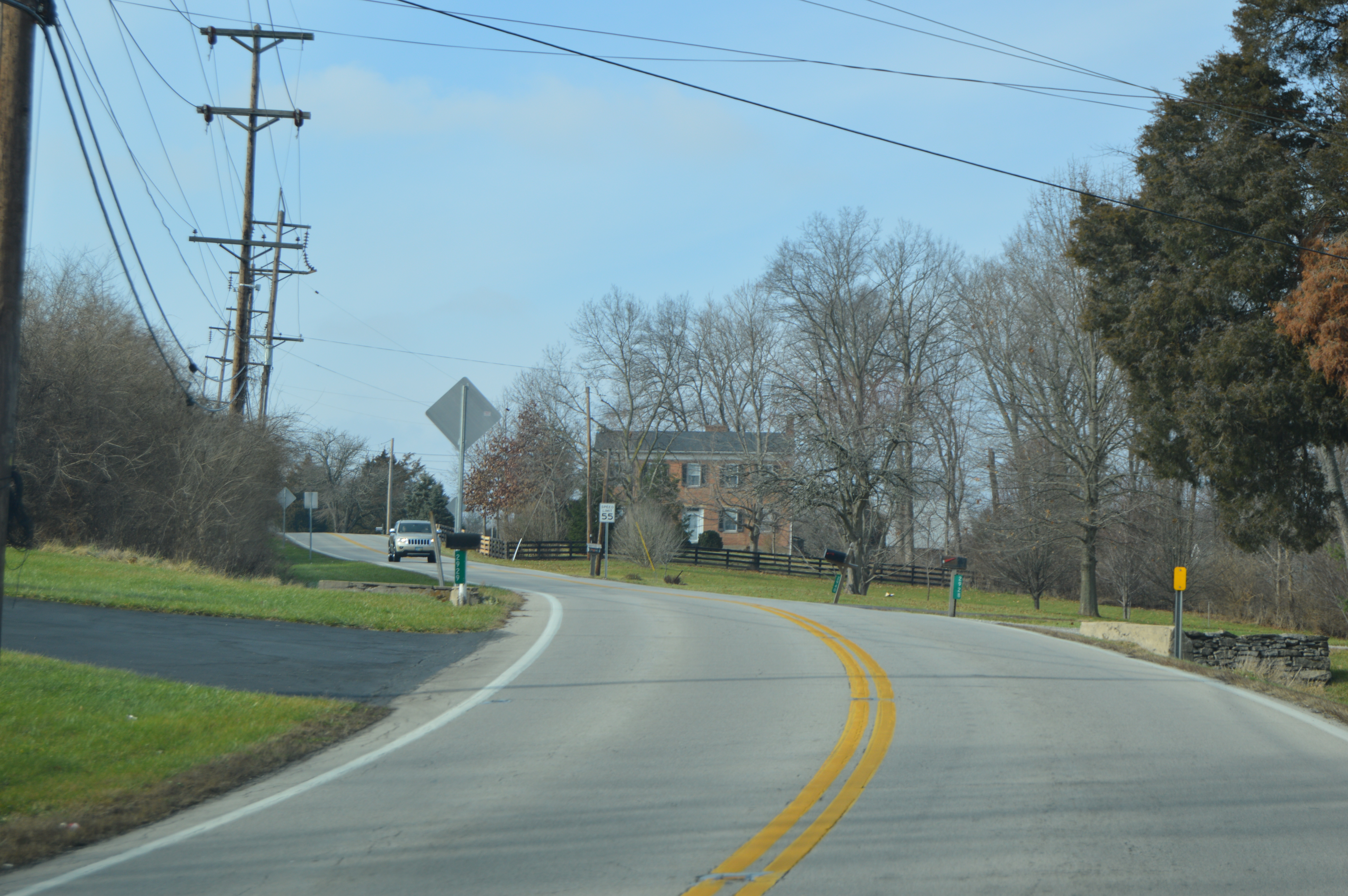
- View from the east

- Location within Ohio Location within the United States
- Nearest city: Millville, Ohio
- Coordinates: 39°23′17″N 84°39′35″W
- Area: 8 acres (3.2 ha)
- Built: 1836
- Architect: James W. Cochran
- NRHP reference No.: 73001390
- Added to NRHP: July 16, 1973

Cochran Farm, 2900 Ohio 129, Millville, was added to the National Register of Historic Places in 1973. The web site of the Ohio Historic Preservation Office of the Ohio Historical Society says "William and Rebecca Cochran came from Adams County, Pennsylvania in 1814. They settled in Hamilton County where they lived until 1825. They then moved to Butler County near Millville. William Cochran owned much property in the area and in 1821 purchased the Millville Mill which had been built by Joel Williams in 1805". The couple "had three sons; one, James W. Cochran, later took over ownership of the mill and settled just west of the town of Millville. He married Mary June Hill and the couple had seven children. The youngest of these lived in the home until his death in 1946. The property is owned by his daughters. The house, dairy and barns, essentially unaltered, are a fine example of a mid 19th century farm group in southern Ohio."
