= Mayo House (Portland, Oregon) =

Martin Mayo House
- Location within Portland, Oregon

General information
- Type: Small Home
- Architectural style: Queen Anne
- Location: 236 NE Sacramento St, Portland, Oregon, United States
- Coordinates: 45°32′23.59″N 122°39′48″W
- Elevation: 47 m (154 ft)
- Named for: Martin Nicholas Mayo
- Estimated completion: 1895 to late 1896
- Relocated: 1912, 1930, 2019

The Mayo House is a historical house built by Martin Nicholas Mayo in the 1890s. It was built in Portland, Oregon's Eliot neighborhood. It is notable for being relocated in 1912, 1930, and 2019 to avoid demolition in order to make room for new construction projects. The house utilizes the Queen Anne architecture style. The relocation of the house in 2019 will see the house repurposed by local artist Cleo Davis as a site for local art and history to be archived and made available for the public. This new archive will be used to show the history of African-Americans in the local area of Portland. In order to reduce the cost of the relocation, the Portland City Council waived $40,000 in fees. The house was relocated in late January 2019.

== Background ==
Namesake and builder of the house, Martin Nicholas Mayo (known also as Martin Mujo) was born on December 7, 1862, and emigrated from Austria in 1868. Moving to Portland in 1874, he entered the food service industry, becoming a restaurant manager in 1890 and marrying fellow Austrian immigrant Lucretia Mary around the same time as he purchased the J.D. McKinnon restaurant, dubbing it the Mayo restaurant. In 1899, George P. Mayo was born in the Mayo House and would be the only son of Martin and Lucretia.

Selling his restaurant in 1911, during the first world war Martin served as a food administrator, commissioned an apartment complex, and lived in his self-titled house until the death of Lucretia in 1919. A decade would pass before Mayo returned to the neighborhood, residing in the Mayo apartments until his passing on September 23, 1942.

== History ==
The Austrian immigrant's family home followed the Queen Anne architectural style as was popular in the area at that time. Located within the Eliot neighborhood in what had been the city of Albina (consolidated into Portland in 1891), the house originally stood at 2401 Union Avenue North, on the northern corner of NE Sacramento Street and Union (now renamed Martin Luther King Jr. Boulevard).

In 1912, the building was first moved to make room for the Mayo Apartments, where Mayo commissioned Swedish builder-designer Christian Hansen to build a three-story complex that still stands today. The house, meanwhile, was moved westward and across the street, moving towards the middle of NE Sacramento Street. Photographed in 1929 as part of preliminary studies prior to the ten-foot widening of Union Avenue, the house was moved again in 1930 - twice, in fact, being moved once and then again to a more permanent foundation once work was complete.

=== Preservation ===
Slated for demolition by then-owner Danielle Isenhart, a permit was filed in the spring of 2018 and approved May 4 by city officials, with a 120-day delay to allow for potential alternatives to the destruction of the house to arise. Community members within the Eliot neighborhood petitioned and contacted officials in an effort to preserve the building, and ultimately neighbor Cleo Davis advocated for moving the house in the name of preserving both the building as well as local African-American history in an effort to combat gentrification.

In response, Portland city officials waived $40,000 in fees to make the move financially viable. The house was then slated to be moved on January 27, 2019, and turned "into a place for art and history that celebrates the black community in Portland and the Eliot neighborhood", according to Oregon Public Broadcasting. Davis now stands as the current owner of the building.

Soon to become part of Cleo Davis's proposed ARTchives, the Mayo House now sits at 236 NE Sacramento Street, Portland, OR, 97212.

=== Renovation ===
In 2019, the Mayo House was threatened with demolition by developers who wished to build ten houses on the site. To prevent the demolition of the historic building, the city sought a buyer who would be willing to relocate the house to another lot in order to save it.

On January 27, 2019, Portland artist Cleo Davis agreed to buy the house and have it moved to the site of the former Davis family house. This was another building on the same street which, after its demolition, was recognized as having historic importance to the Portland Black community. They plan to fix the house and open it to the public.

== See also ==
- Gentrification of Portland, Oregon
