= Cochran–Rice Farm Complex =

- U.S. National Register of Historic Places
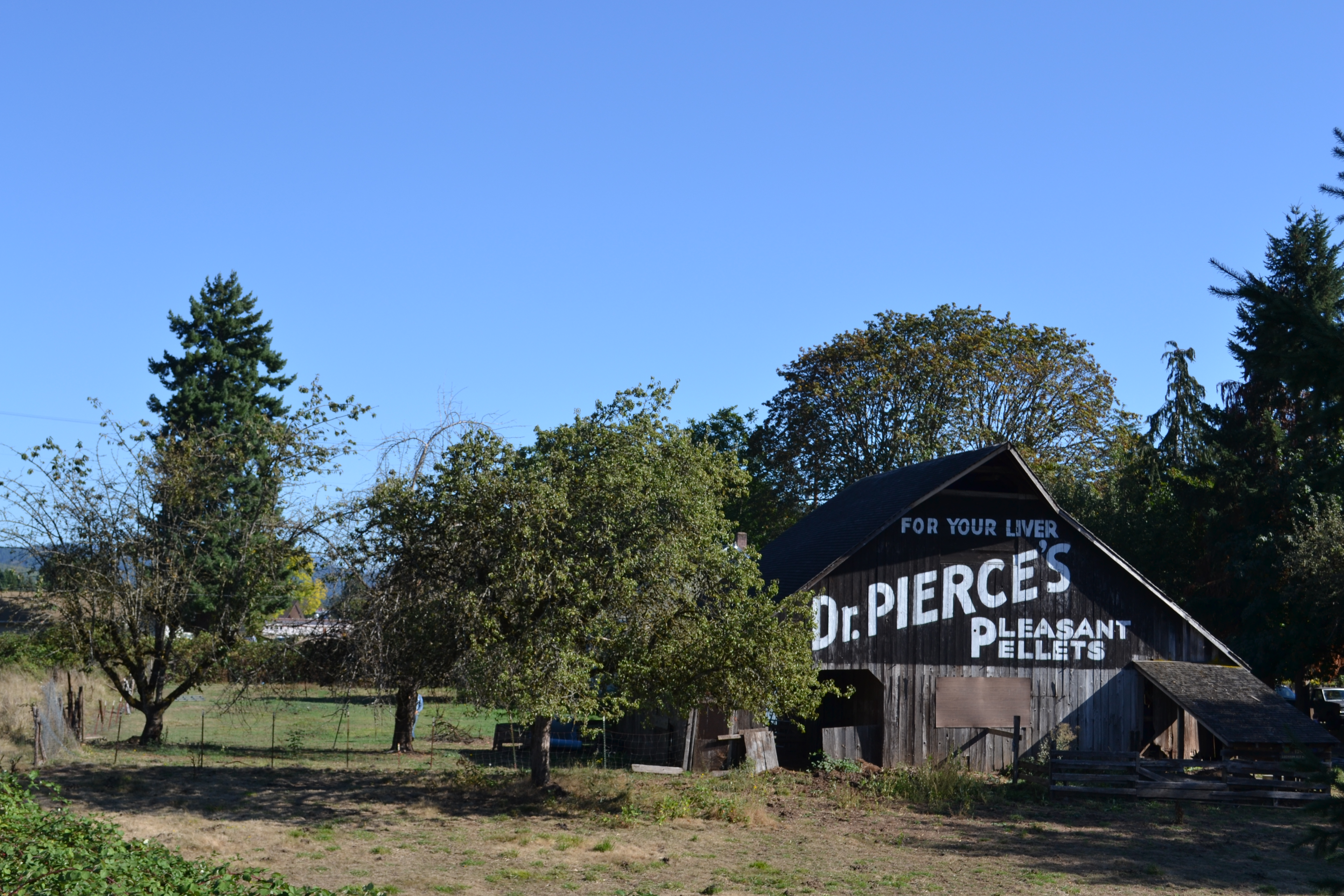

- Location within Oregon Location within the United States
- Location: 993 N. Lane St., Cottage Grove, Oregon
- Coordinates: 43°48′19″N 123°3′9″W
- Area: 2.5 acres (1.0 ha)
- Built: 1912
- Architectural style: Bungalow/Craftsman, Western style
- NRHP reference No.: 91001558
- Added to NRHP: October 17, 1991

The Cochran–Rice Farm Complex, which included the Dr. Pierce's Pleasant Pellets Barn, is located in Cottage Grove, Oregon. The complex was listed on the National Register of Historic Places (NRHP) in 1991. The barn was demolished in 2012 following the expiration of a 20-year easement held by the local historical society.

== History ==
In 1852, John Cochran settled his Donation Land Claim near what is now Cottage Grove, Oregon. Cochran's land included 643 acres. However, by 1902, Chochran's son, Robert Cochran, owned 23 acres, and this remaining acreage was deeded to Robert's daughter, Martha Rice.

At the time of NRHP listing in 1991, the property included a bungalow style house built in 1910, a garage built in 1989, a shed built in 1900, and a flattened, prairie style barn constructed in 1900. The farm complex included 2.5 remaining acres. The house, shed, and barn were listed as contributing resources in the historic site designation.

In 1912, the barn was painted with an advertisement for Dr. Pierce's Pleasant Pellets. Ray V. Pierce had sold patent medicines in an era prior to the Pure Food and Drug Act, and he relied upon barns and other easily noticed surfaces for low-cost advertising. In exchange for the advertisement, an owner might be compensated with a free coat of paint on a barn. The barn was repaired and repainted prior to NRHP listing.

== Barn demolition ==
In 2008, new owner Doug Stout acquired the farm complex through foreclosure. At that time, the size of the property had decreased to 1.7 acres. Stout tried to sell the barn to anyone who would move it off his property. He also tried to sell the barn plus 1.3 acres. His attempts to sell the barn were unsuccessful; in 2012, he demolished the building.

The Cochran–Rice Farm Complex remains on the NRHP, although absent its historic barn with the advertisement, "For your liver, Dr. Pierce's Pleasant Pellets."

== See also ==
- National Register of Historic Places listings in Lane County, Oregon
