= Restore Oregon =

Historic Preservation League of Oregon logo, 2009–July 2013

Restore Oregon, formerly the Historic Preservation League of Oregon (HPLO), is an organization dedicated to protecting endangered places in Oregon. Formed in Eugene, Oregon, in 1976, Restore Oregon was officially incorporated in 1977 and relocated to Portland, Oregon, soon thereafter. In addition to the Board of Directors, Restore Oregon has several active volunteer committees and a regional and topical Board of Advisors. As of February 2009, Peggy Moretti serves as the organization’s Executive Director. Known for 37 years as the Historic Preservation League of Oregon, the group announced in July 2013 that it was changing its name to Restore Oregon.
