= Amusement rides on the National Register of Historic Places =

List of historical amusement rides

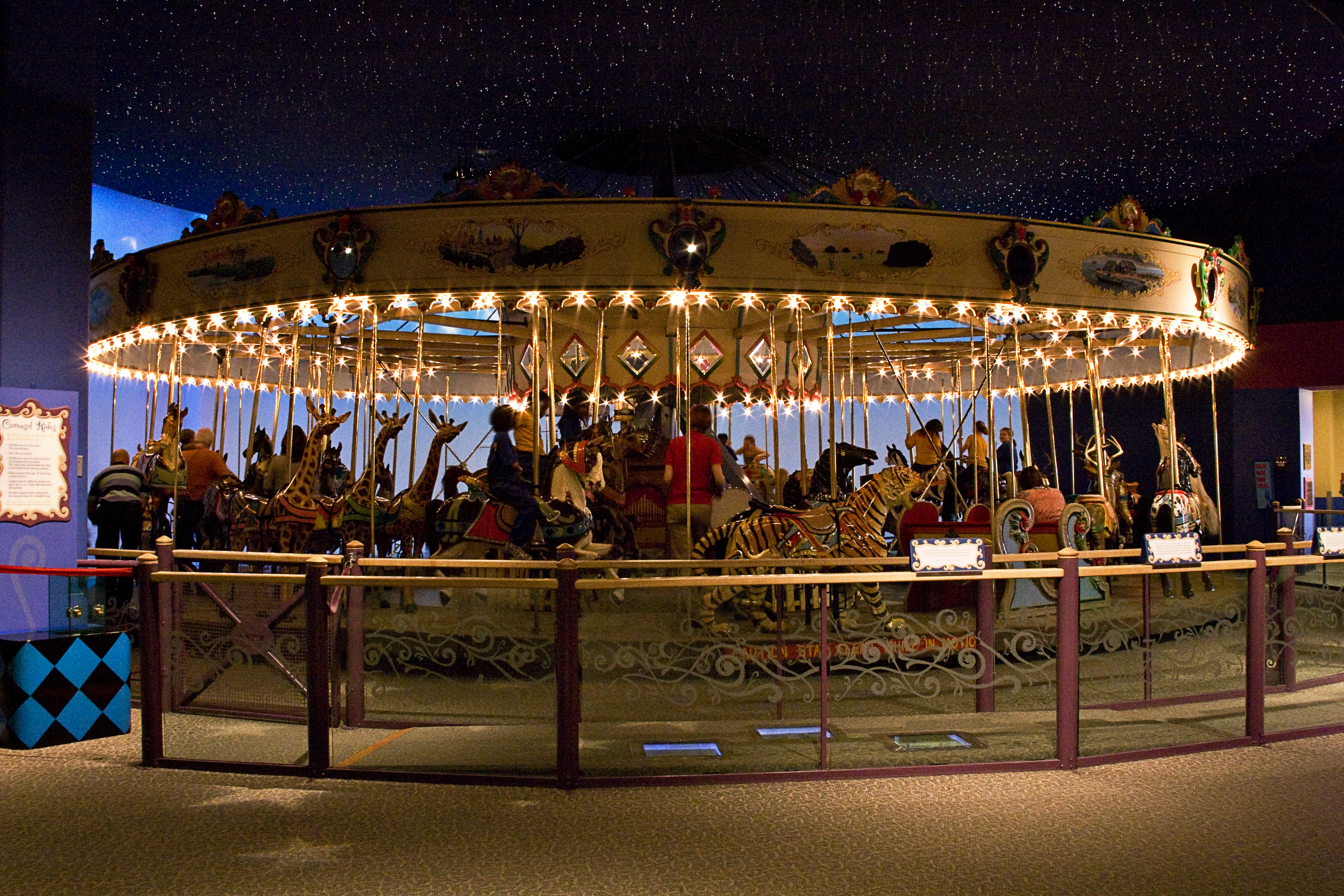
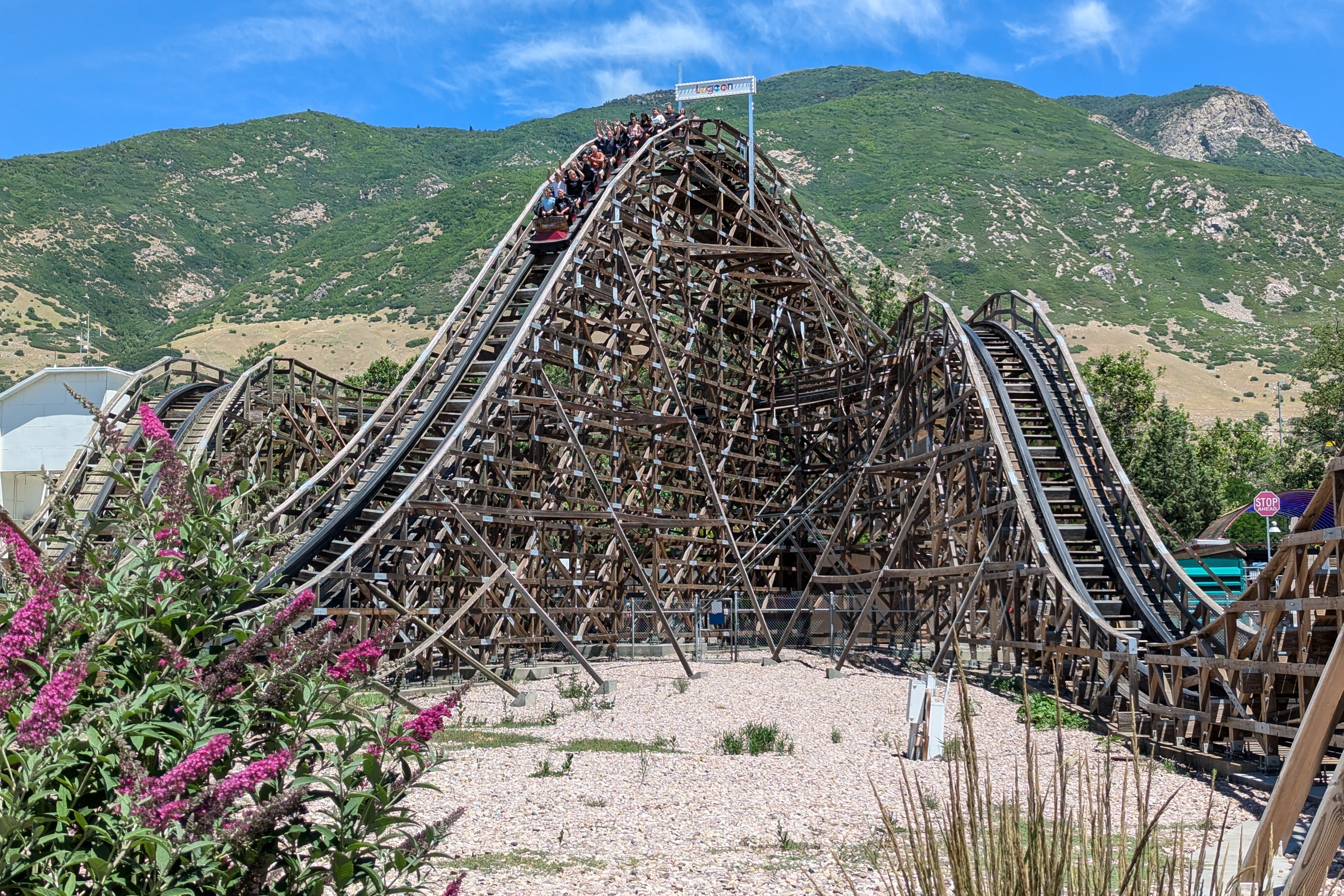
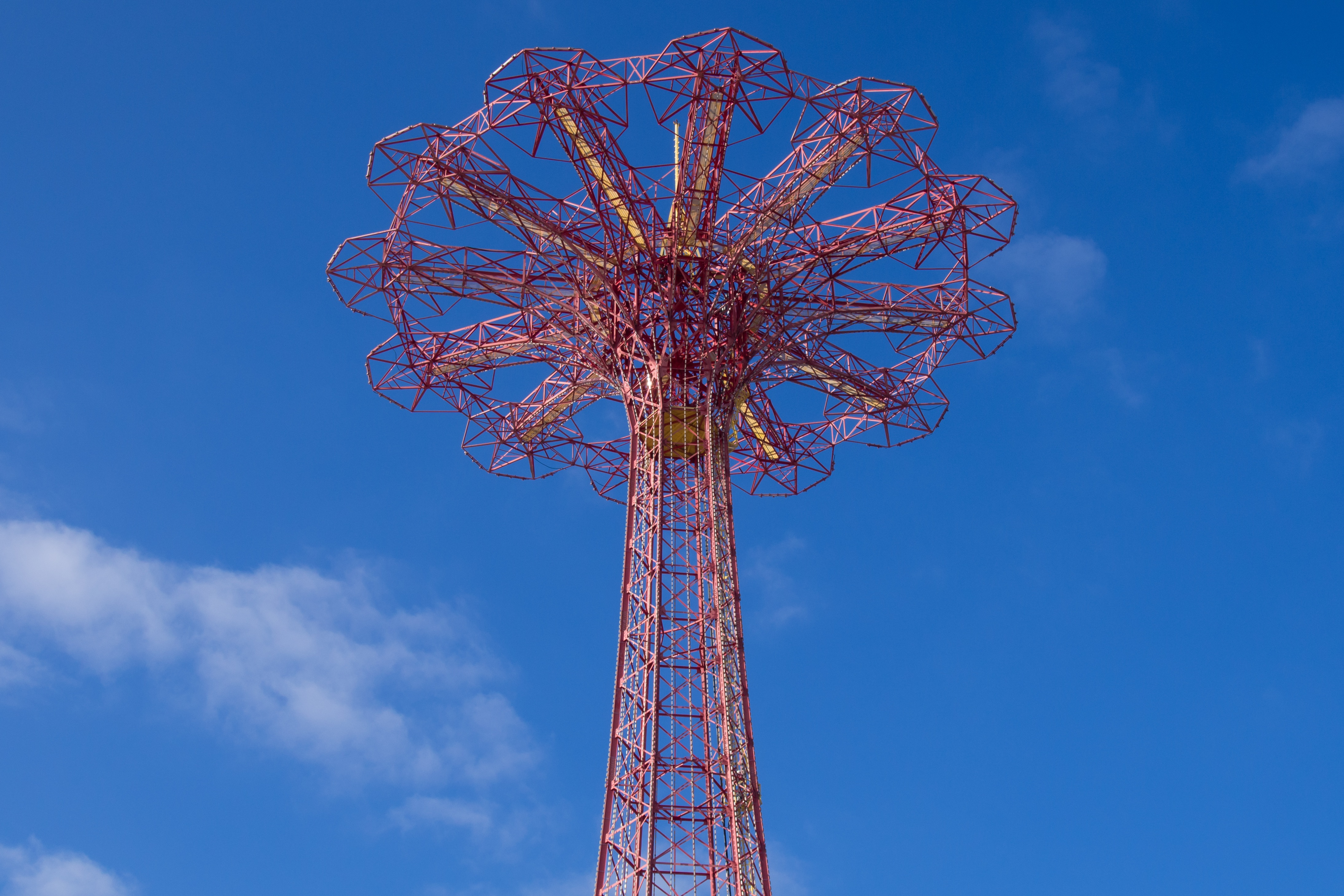
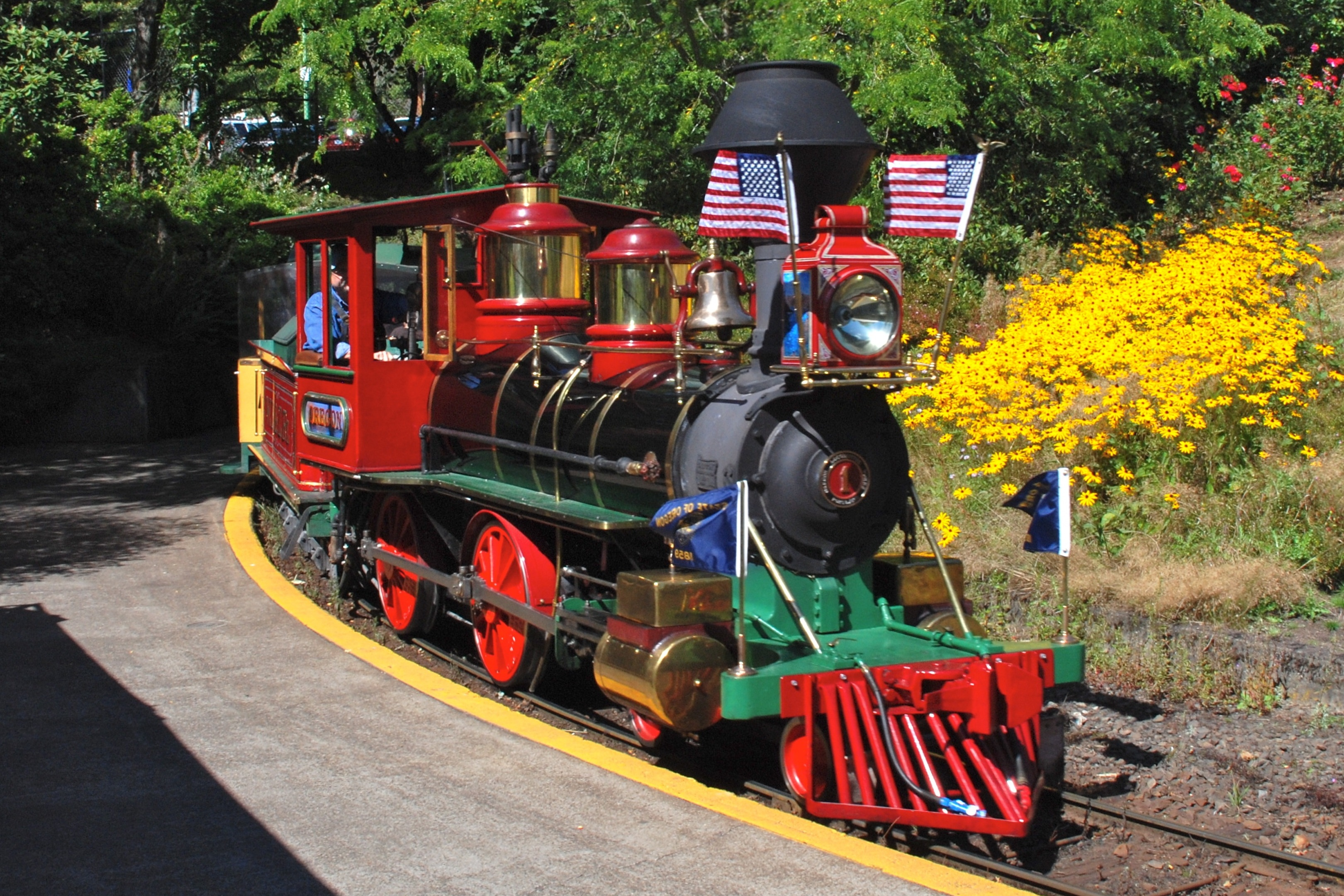
Clockwise from top left: Broad Ripple Park Carousel in Indianapolis, Lagoon Roller Coaster in Farmington, Utah, Portland Zoo Railway Historic District in Portland, Oregon, and Parachute Jump in Brooklyn, each of which are listed on the National Register of Historic Places.

Amusement rides currently and previously listed on the U.S. National Register of Historic Places (NRHP) are located throughout the United States. These ride listings consist mainly of 55 carousels (50 listed and 5 delisted), but also include 6 roller coasters (5 listed and 1 delisted), 3 trains (all 3 listed), and 2 rides that are other types (both listed). Many of these rides with NRHP status operate within amusement parks, with more than one present in Cedar Point in Ohio, Lagoon in Utah, and Santa Cruz Beach Boardwalk in California (the NRHP-listed carousel and roller coaster in the latter share the same listing). NRHP rides are also run in public parks, museums, zoos, and as stand-alone attractions, with high concentrations in New York City (especially in Luna Park along the Riegelmann Boardwalk in Coney Island), the Greater Binghamton area in New York state, and Portland, Oregon.

The creation of NRHP listings started after the National Historic Preservation Act was signed into law in 1966, and the first amusement ride listing was added in 1975 for the Idora Park Merry-Go-Round in Ohio (delisted in 1985 and now operating in New York City). The listing for the Crescent Park Looff Carousel in Rhode Island was added in 1976 and is the ride that has existed on the NRHP the longest. The listing for the Portland Zoo Railway Historic District in Oregon was created in 2020 and is the newest ride entry on the NRHP. Several NRHP-listed rides, including the Leap-the-Dips roller coaster in Pennsylvania, have a higher National Historic Landmark status, a distinction granted to NRHP entries with national significance. Of the nearly 100,000 NRHP listings as of July 2024, fewer than 100 are for amusement rides (see tables below). The tables in this article only include NRHP entries that focus on individual rides and do not include historic districts or National Historic Landmark Districts that currently (or previously) contain multiple rides.

Color code
	National Register of Historic Places
^{†}	National Historic Landmark
^{‡}	Historic district
^{*}	NRHP-delisted

== Carousels ==
Carousels
# (Note: Numbers represent an alphabetical ordering by state/territory and then city, and if applicable, borough and then neighborhood. Various colorings, defined here, differentiate National Historic Landmarks and historic districts from other NRHP buildings, structures, sites, or objects.)	Name on the Register	Image	Date listed (Note: The eight-digit number below each date is the number assigned to each location in the National Register Information System database, which can be viewed by clicking the number.)	Location	City or town	Description
1	Herschell-Spillman Carousel	Herschell-Spillman Carousel	December 1, 1989 (#89002065)	War Memorial Park Midway; 34°44′51″N 92°19′48″W	Little Rock, Arkansas	Built in 1924. Located in Little Rock Zoo since 2007. Rare undulating platform.
2	Hershell-Spillman Merry-Go-Round	Hershell-Spillman Merry-Go-Round	September 29, 1976 (#76000480)	East of Berkeley in Tilden Regional Park; 37°54′02″N 122°15′22″W	Berkeley, California	Built in 1911
3	Spillman Engineering 3-Abreast Carousel		April 13, 2000 (#00000366)	139 B Eastridge; 37°19′32″N 121°48′50″W	San Jose, California	Built c. 1920. Moved to Eastridge shopping mall in 1993 and received its NRHP listing there in 2000. Owned by Perron family.
4	Allan Herschell 3-Abreast Carousel	Allan Herschell 3-Abreast Carousel	April 13, 2000 (#00000363)	Chase Palm Park; 223 East Cabrillo Boulevard; 34°24′54″N 119°41′10″W	Santa Barbara, California	Built in 1916. Located in Chase Palm Park until 2017. Owned by Perron family.
5^{†}	Looff Carousel and Roller Coaster on the Santa Cruz Beach Boardwalk	Looff Carousel and Roller Coaster on the Santa Cruz Beach Boardwalk	February 27, 1987 (#87000764)	Santa Cruz Beach Boardwalk; Along Beach Street; 36°57′52″N 122°01′03″W	Santa Cruz, California	Built in 1911 (carousel)
6^{†}	Elitch Gardens Carousel	Elitch Gardens Carousel	December 19, 1978 (#78000861)	Kit Carson County Fairgrounds; 39°18′33″N 102°16′15″W	Burlington, Colorado	Built in 1905
7	City Park Carousel	City Park Carousel	April 21, 1983 (#83001297)	City Park; 38°15′42″N 104°39′16″W	Pueblo, Colorado	Built in 1911
8	Lighthouse Point Carousel	Lighthouse Point Carousel	December 15, 1983 (#83003578)	Lighthouse Point Park, Lighthouse Avenue; 41°14′55″N 72°54′11″W	New Haven, Connecticut	Built in 1916. Renaissance Revival shelter building.
9	Lake Compounce Carousel	Lake Compounce Carousel	December 12, 1978 (#78002865)	Lake Compounce; West of Southington on Lake Avenue; 41°38′23″N 72°55′26″W	Southington, Connecticut	Built c. 1890
10	Traveling Carousel	Traveling Carousel	September 11, 1997 (#97001116)	Junction of Massachusetts and Wisconsin Avenues Northwest; 38°55′53″N 77°04′18″W	Washington, D.C.	Built in 1890s. Assembled and operated multiple times each year for fundraisers and fairs adjacent to Washington National Cathedral.
11	Riverview Carousel at Six Flags Over Georgia	Riverview Carousel at Six Flags Over Georgia	January 27, 1995 (#94001639)	Six Flags Over Georgia; 7561 Six Flags Parkway; 33°46′01″N 84°33′03″W	Austell, Georgia	Built in 1908
12^{†}	Broad Ripple Park Carousel	Broad Ripple Park Carousel	February 27, 1987 (#87000839)	Children's Museum of Indianapolis; Meridian and Thirtieth Streets; 39°48′38″N 86°09′27″W	Indianapolis, Indiana	Built in 1917
13^{†}	Spencer Park Dentzel Carousel	Spencer Park Dentzel Carousel	February 27, 1987 (#87000838)	Riverside Park; 40°45′35″N 86°21′20″W	Logansport, Indiana	Built c. 1900–1903
14	Herschel-Spillman Two-Row Portable Menagerie Carousel	Herschel-Spillman Two-Row Portable Menagerie Carousel	June 6, 1986 (#86001244)	North Park, Story Street, and Grove Avenue; 42°11′17″N 93°35′16″W	Story City, Iowa	Built in 1913
15^{†}	Parker Carousel	Parker Carousel	February 27, 1987 (#87000813)	Dickinson County Historical Museum; 412 South Campbell Street; 38°54′41″N 97°12′29″W	Abilene, Kansas	Built c. 1898–1901
16	New Orleans City Park Carousel and Pavilion	New Orleans City Park Carousel and Pavilion	February 13, 1986 (#86000254)	Carousel Gardens Amusement Park; City Park, off City Park Avenue; 29°59′16″N 90°05′56″W	New Orleans, Louisiana	Built c. 1910
17	Carousel at Glen Echo Park	Carousel at Glen Echo Park	July 4, 1980 (#80000351)	MacArthur Boulevard; 38°57′58″N 77°08′20″W	Glen Echo, Maryland	Built in 1921
18	Paragon Park Carousel	Paragon Park Carousel	September 14, 1999 (#99001081)	1 Wharf Avenue; 42°16′13″N 70°51′24″W	Hull, Massachusetts	Built in 1928
19^{†}	Flying Horses	Flying Horses	August 27, 1979 (#79000342)	33 Oak Bluffs Avenue; 41°27′27″N 70°33′26″W	Oak Bluffs, Massachusetts	Built in 1876. Oldest operational platform carousel in the United States.
20	Armitage Herschell Carousel	Armitage Herschell Carousel	March 28, 2012 (#12000155)	E.E. Bass Cultural Arts Center; 323 Main Street; 33°24′15″N 91°03′14″W	Greenville, Mississippi	Built in 1901
21^{†}	Highland Park Dentzel Carousel and Shelter Building	Highland Park Dentzel Carousel and Shelter Building	February 27, 1987 (#87000863)	Highland Park; 32°22′37″N 88°43′07″W	Meridian, Mississippi	Built c. 1892–1899
22	Seaside Heights Carousel	Seaside Heights Carousel	February 27, 2026 (#100012756)	1401 Ocean Terrace; 39°56′48″N 74°04′11″W	Seaside Heights, New Jersey	Built c. 1935
23	George F. Johnson Recreation Park Carousel	George F. Johnson Recreation Park Carousel	January 25, 1992 (#91001967)	George F. Johnson Recreation Park; 42°05′57″N 75°56′01″W	Binghamton, New York	Built in 1925. Part of Broome County Carousels NRHP multiple property submission (MPS).
24	Ross Park Carousel	Ross Park Carousel	January 25, 1992 (#91001966)	Ross Park Zoo; Ross Park; 42°04′32″N 75°54′28″W	Binghamton, New York	Built in 1920. Part of Broome County Carousels NRHP MPS.
25	George W. Johnson Park Carousel	George W. Johnson Park Carousel	January 25, 1992 (#91001964)	George W. Johnson Park; 42°06′41″N 76°03′02″W	Endicott, New York	Built in 1934. Part of Broome County Carousels NRHP MPS.
26	West Endicott Park Carousel	West Endicott Park Carousel	January 25, 1992 (#91001965)	West Endicott Park; 42°05′53″N 76°04′27″W	Endicott, New York	Built c. 1929. Part of Broome County Carousels NRHP MPS.
27	Highland Park Carousel	Highland Park Carousel	January 25, 1992 (#91001963)	Highland Park, Cooper Road; 42°07′31″N 76°01′44″W	Endwell, New York	Built c. 1920–1925. Part of Broome County Carousels NRHP MPS.
28	C. Fred Johnson Park Carousel	C. Fred Johnson Park Carousel	January 25, 1992 (#91001968)	C. Fred Johnson Park; 42°07′03″N 75°57′00″W	Johnson City, New York	Built in 1923. Part of Broome County Carousels NRHP MPS.
29	B&B Carousell	B&B Carousell	February 23, 2016 (#16000035)	Luna Park; 1615 Boardwalk; 40°34′23″N 73°59′00″W	New York, New York (Coney Island, Brooklyn)	Built in 1906 or 1909. Only historic carousel made in Coney Island that is still located in Coney Island.
30	1964-1965 New York World's Fair Carousel	1964-1965 New York World's Fair Carousel	February 23, 2016 (#16000038)	Fantasy Forest Amusement Park; 54th & 56th Avenues on 111th Street; 40°44′36″N 73°50′57″W	New York, New York (Flushing, Queens)	Built in 1964. Combination of two historic carousels made in Coney Island.
31	Forest Park Carousel	Forest Park Carousel	July 16, 2004 (#04000706)	Woodhaven Boulevard and Myrtle Avenue; 40°42′01″N 73°51′24″W	New York, New York (Woodhaven, Queens)	Built in 1903
32	Twentieth Century Steam Riding Gallery No. 409	Twentieth Century Steam Riding Gallery No. 409	January 16, 1998 (#97001618)	Race Street; 42°32′50″N 74°49′32″W	Schenevus, New York	Built c. 1909
33	Philadelphia Toboggan Company Carousel Number 15	Philadelphia Toboggan Company Carousel Number 15	June 8, 2001 (#01000583)	Palisades Center; 1000 Palisades Center; 41°05′48″N 73°57′21″W	West Nyack, New York	Built c. 1907. Located in Palisades Center shopping mall until 2009. In storage in Portland, Oregon, as of 2010. Owned by Perron family.
34	Menagerie Carousel	Menagerie Carousel	August 30, 1982 (#82003420)	Burlington City Park; 1368 South Main Street; 36°05′05″N 79°27′09″W	Burlington, North Carolina	Built c. 1913
35	Pullen Park Carousel	Pullen Park Carousel	September 8, 1976 (#76001344)	Pullen Park, Western Boulevard; 35°46′48″N 78°39′50″W	Raleigh, North Carolina	Built c. 1900
36	William H. Dentzel 1921 Carousel	William H. Dentzel 1921 Carousel	November 8, 1990 (#90000627)	Frontiertown, Cedar Point Amusement Park; 41°29′04″N 82°41′33″W	Sandusky, Ohio	Built in 1921. Located in Dorney Park in Dorneyville, Pennsylvania, since 1995.
37	William H. Dentzel 1924 Carousel	William H. Dentzel 1924 Carousel	November 8, 1990 (#90000625)	Kiddieland, Cedar Point Amusement Park; 41°28′51″N 82°40′51″W	Sandusky, Ohio	Built in 1924
38	Great American Racing Derby	Great American Racing Derby	November 8, 1990 (#90000626)	Midway, Cedar Point Amusement Park; 41°28′50″N 82°40′56″W	Sandusky, Ohio	Built in 1922. Horse figures move backwards and forwards as the platform spins, creating a horse racing effect. One of only two racing carousels that still exist in the United States.
39	Daniel C. Muller Carousel	Daniel C. Muller Carousel	October 20, 1982 (#82001426)	Midway at Cedar Point; 41°28′44″N 82°40′47″W	Sandusky, Ohio	Built in 1912
40	Herschell-Spillman Noah's Ark Carousel	Herschell-Spillman Noah's Ark Carousel	August 26, 1987 (#87001380)	Oaks Amusement Park; East End of Sellwood Bridge; 45°28′22″N 122°39′44″W	Portland, Oregon	Built c. 1913
41	William F. Mangels Four-Row Carousel	William F. Mangels Four-Row Carousel	August 26, 1987 (#87001383)	4033 Southwest Canyon Road; 45°30′37″N 122°43′04″W	Portland, Oregon	Built c. 1914. Moved to World Forestry Center in 1978 and received its NRHP listing there in 1987. Owned by Perron family.
42	Weona Park Carousel	Weona Park Carousel	August 4, 1999 (#99000879)	PA 512; 40°52′16″N 75°14′52″W	Pen Argyl, Pennsylvania	Built in 1917
43^{†}	Crescent Park Looff Carousel	Crescent Park Looff Carousel	April 21, 1976 (#76000045)	Bullock's Point Avenue; 41°45′24″N 71°21′34″W	East Providence, Rhode Island	Built c. 1895
44^{†}	Flying Horse Carousel	Flying Horse Carousel	January 11, 1980 (#80000019)	Bay Street; 41°18′33″N 71°51′30″W	Westerly, Rhode Island	Built c. 1876. Horse figures suspended from chains rather than mounted on poles.
45	C.W. Parker Carousel No. 825		July 31, 2017 (#100001399)	109 9th Avenue South; 45°02′02″N 99°07′32″W	Faulkton, South Dakota	Built c. 1950–1955. All horse figures are cast aluminum, a carousel industry standard during the mid-20th century.
46	Herschell-Spillman Steam Riding Gallery		December 6, 2016 (#16000825)	Prairie Village; 45205 SD 34/US 81; 44°00′24″N 97°10′03″W	Madison, South Dakota	Built c. 1903
47	Lagoon Carousel	Lagoon Carousel	October 24, 2012 (#12000883)	Lagoon; 375 Lagoon Drive; 40°59′06″N 111°53′38″W	Farmington, Utah	Built c. 1913
48	Buckroe Beach Carousel	Buckroe Beach Carousel	October 27, 1992 (#92001396)	602 Settlers Landing Road; 37°01′26″N 76°20′36″W	Hampton, Virginia	Built in 1920
49	Natatorium Carousel	Natatorium Carousel	September 19, 1977 (#77001362)	Riverfront Park; Spokane Falls Boulevard; 47°39′39″N 117°25′13″W	Spokane, Washington	Built in 1909
50	City of Waterloo Carousel	City of Waterloo Carousel	August 15, 1997 (#97000890)	Firemen's Park; 500 Park Avenue; 43°11′21″N 88°59′07″W	Waterloo, Wisconsin	Built in 1911. Fully restored and moved to higher ground within the park by 2011 after receiving major flood damage three years prior.

=== Former carousel listings ===
#	Name on the Register	Image	Date listed	Date removed	Location	City or town	Description
1^{*}	Idora Park Merry-Go-Round	Idora Park Merry-Go-Round	February 6, 1975 (#75001482)	October 29, 1985	Idora Park on Canfield Road; 41°04′16″N 80°41′10″W	Youngstown, Ohio	Built in 1922. Located in Brooklyn Bridge Park in New York City since 2011. First carousel added to NRHP.
2^{*}	Charles Looff 20-Sweep Menagerie Carousel	Charles Looff 20-Sweep Menagerie Carousel	August 26, 1987 (#87001379)	May 27, 1998	Holladay Street at Northeast Eighth Avenue; 45°31′47″N 122°39′27″W	Portland, Oregon	Built in 1895. Located in Seaport Village in San Diego, California, since 2004. Owned by Perron family.
3^{*}	C. W. Parker Four-Row Park Carousel	C. W. Parker Four-Row Park Carousel	August 26, 1987 (#87001381)	January 4, 2008	Jantzen Beach Center; 1492 Jantzen Beach Center; 45°36′44″N 122°41′02″W	Portland, Oregon	Built in 1921. Located in Jantzen Beach Center shopping mall until 2012. In storage in North Portland, Oregon, as of 2023. Planned to reopen at National Neon Sign Museum in The Dalles, Oregon, by 2028.
4^{*}	Allan Herschell Two-Abreast Carousel		August 26, 1987 (#87001382)	May 27, 1998	300 Broadway; 45°59′37″N 123°55′35″W	Seaside, Oregon	Built c. 1926. Moved to Seaside Town Center shopping mall in 1987 and received its NRHP listing there that same year. In storage as of 2011. Owned by Perron family.
5^{*}	Libertyland Grand Carousel	Libertyland Grand Carousel	July 3, 1980 (#80003865)	November 18, 2009	Libertyland Theme Park; 35°07′08″N 89°59′01″W	Memphis, Tennessee	Built in 1909. Located in Children's Museum of Memphis since 2017.

== Roller coasters ==
Roller coasters
#	Name on the Register	Image	Date listed	Location	City or town	Description
1^{†}	Mission Beach Roller Coaster	Mission Beach Roller Coaster	December 27, 1978 (#78000753)	Belmont Park; 3000 Mission Boulevard; 32°46′17″N 117°15′06″W	San Diego, California	Built in 1925
2^{†}	Looff Carousel and Roller Coaster on the Santa Cruz Beach Boardwalk	Looff Carousel and Roller Coaster on the Santa Cruz Beach Boardwalk	February 27, 1987 (#87000764)	Santa Cruz Beach Boardwalk; Along Beach Street; 36°57′52″N 122°00′58″W	Santa Cruz, California	Built in 1924 (roller coaster)
3	Cyclone Roller Coaster	Cyclone Roller Coaster	June 25, 1991 (#91000907)	Luna Park; 834 Surf Avenue at West 10th Street; 40°34′30″N 73°58′40″W	New York, New York (Coney Island, Brooklyn)	Built in 1927
4^{†}	Leap-the-Dips	Leap-the-Dips	March 15, 1991 (#91000229)	Lakemont Park; 700 Park Avenue; 40°28′14″N 78°23′47″W	Altoona, Pennsylvania	Built in 1902. Oldest operational roller coaster in the world.
5	Lagoon Roller Coaster	Lagoon Roller Coaster	October 24, 2012 (#12000885)	Lagoon; 375 North Lagoon Drive; 40°59′05″N 111°53′39″W	Farmington, Utah	Built in 1921

=== Former roller coaster listing ===
#	Name on the Register	Image	Date listed	Date removed	Location	City or town	Description
1^{*}	Pippin Roller Coaster	Pippin Roller Coaster	November 8, 2007 (#07001166)	March 21, 2011	Mid-South Fairgrounds bounded by East Parkway, Central & Southern Avenues & Early Maxwell Boulevard; 44°32′00″N 87°58′59″W	Memphis, Tennessee	Built in 1912. Ridden constantly by Elvis Presley for a two-hour period while renting Libertyland in the early morning hours of August 8, 1977, the last time he appeared in public before his death on August 16, 1977. Located in Bay Beach Amusement Park in Green Bay, Wisconsin, since 2011.

== Trains ==
Trains
#	Name on the Register	Image	Date listed	Location	City or town	Description
1	Century Flyer	Century Flyer	May 28, 2010 (#10000284)	Conway Human Development Center; 150 East Siebenmorgan Road; 35°06′08″N 92°25′44″W	Conway, Arkansas	Built c. 1955
2	East Tennessee & Western North Carolina Railroad Locomotive No. 12	East Tennessee & Western North Carolina Railroad Locomotive No. 12	March 12, 1992 (#92000147)	Tweetsie Railroad Theme Park, Junction of Tweetsie Railroad Road and US 321; 36°10′16″N 81°38′55″W	Blowing Rock, North Carolina	Built in 1917
3^{‡}	Portland Zoo Railway Historic District	Portland Zoo Railway Historic District	March 5, 2020 (#100005018)	Oregon Zoo and Washington Park; 4001 Southwest Canyon Road; 45°30′33″N 122°42′57″W	Portland, Oregon	Built in 1958

== Other ==
Other
#	Name on the Register	Image	Date listed	Location	City or town	Description
1	Parachute Jump	Parachute Jump	September 2, 1980 (#80002645)	Luna Park; Coney Island; 40°34′23″N 73°59′04″W	New York, New York (Coney Island, Brooklyn)	Built in 1939. Standing, but not operating since the closure of Steeplechase Park in 1964.
2	Lagoon Flying Scooter	Lagoon Flying Scooter	October 24, 2012 (#12000884)	Lagoon; 375 North Lagoon Drive; 40°59′14″N 111°53′36″W	Farmington, Utah	Built in 1941. Bisch-Rocco Amusement Company Flying Scooter model.

== See also ==
- Herschell Carrousel Factory Museum
- Kennywood, National Historic Landmark District
- Rye Playland, National Historic Landmark District
- Santa Monica Looff Hippodrome, National Historic Landmark
