= Jane's Carousel =

Carousel in Brooklyn, New York

- Jane's Carousel (Formerly the Idora Park Merry-Go-Round)
- Formerly listed on the U.S. National Register of Historic Places
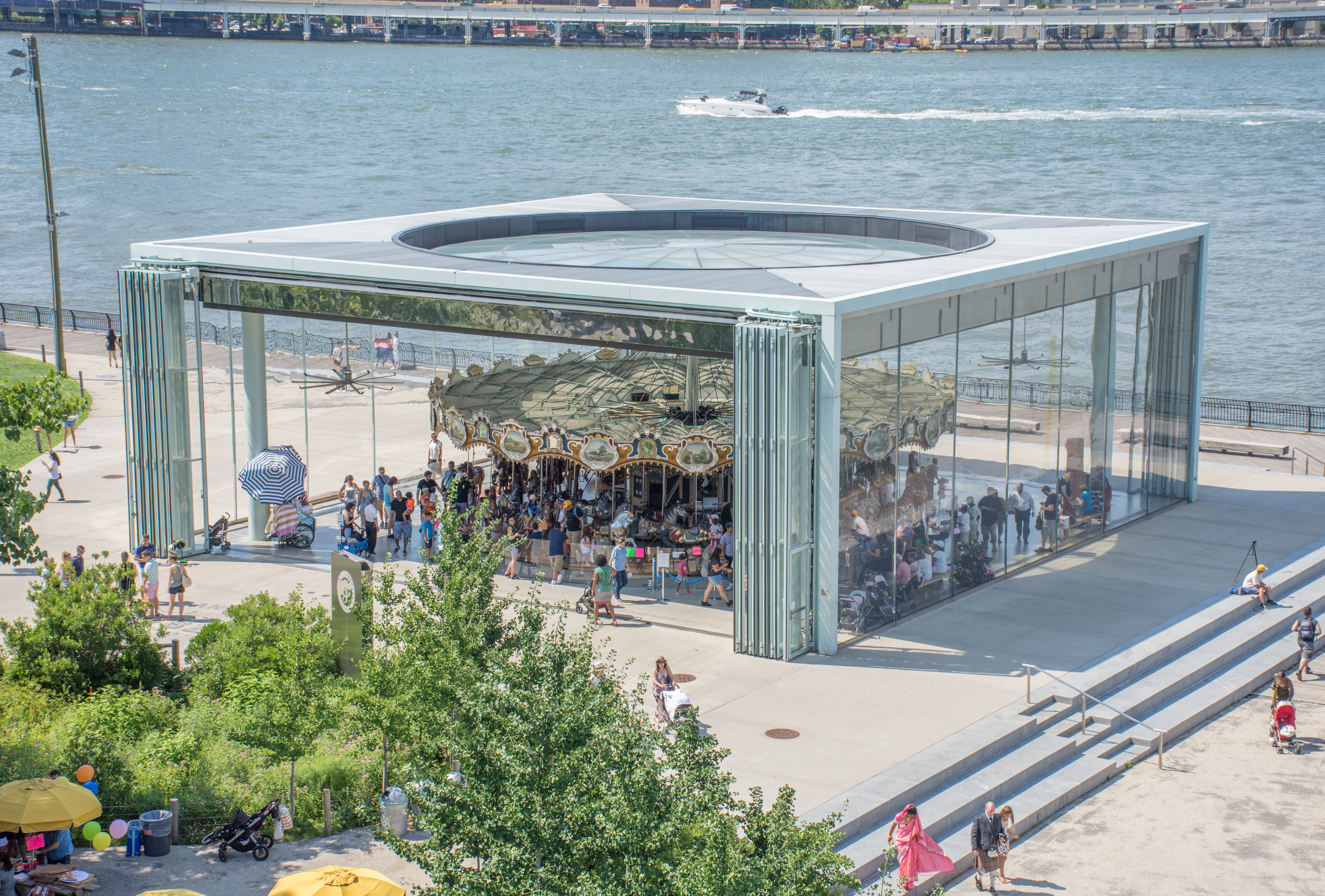
- Jane's Carousel in Brooklyn in July 2017
- Location: Formerly at Idora Park near Canfield Road, Youngstown, Ohio; Currently at Brooklyn Bridge Park, Brooklyn, New York
- Coordinates: 40.70442°N 73.99238°W
- Built: 1922
- Architect: The carvings are attributed to John Zalar & Frank Carretta
- NRHP reference No.: 75001482

Significant dates
- Added to NRHP: February 6, 1975
- Removed from NRHP: October 29, 1985

Jane's Carousel (formerly Idora Park Merry-Go-Round) is a carved wooden 48-horse carousel in Brooklyn, New York City, built in 1922 by the Philadelphia Toboggan Company (PTC) for the Idora Park amusement park in Youngstown, Ohio. It was carved by John Zalar and Frank Carretta, each of whom is attributed with carvings on carousels constructed by PTC and other carousel companies like Looff. The carousel has 30 "jumpers," 18 "standers," two chariots, and a Gebrüder Bruder Band Organ that provides the carousel’s music. Jane's Carousel was listed on the National Register of Historic Places (NRHP) on February 6, 1975, the first carousel to receive such designation. The merry-go-round was delisted from the NRHP on October 29, 1985.

When Idora Park closed to the public in 1984, the carousel was bought at auction by Jane and David Walentas and moved to Brooklyn, New York, for restoration. It was opened to the public at its new location in Brooklyn Bridge Park on the East River in Brooklyn on September 16, 2011. The building commissioned by the Walentas to house the carousel was designed by the French architect Jean Nouvel.

== History ==
The wooden merry-go-round (or carousel), which was built by the Philadelphia Toboggan Company in 1922, features 48 carved horses attributed to John Zalar and Frank Carretta. The manufacturer designated it PTC #61. The carousel had operated for many years at Idora Park in Youngstown, Ohio until a fire at the park prompted the owners to decide to put the carousel up for sale.

The Wurlitzer Style 153 Band Organ resides at DeBence Antique Music World in Franklin, Pennsylvania

At Idora's 1984 auction, the carousel was sold for $385,000 to David Walentas, a real estate developer, and Jane Walentas, a former art director for Estee Lauder. The auction was described by local Mickey Rindin to Vince Guerrieri in The New Colonist:

First, bids were taken on each individual horse. Then, when each individual horse had a sale price, bids were taken for the whole carousel. The opening bid was the sum of the price for all the horses plus ten percent, which came to $385,000. A buyer was found, and a great cry went up from the crowd because the horses would stay together. 'They didn't want it to leave one horse at a time,' Rindin said.

Originally, the carousel was supposed to be located in a waterfront development at Fulton Ferry, Brooklyn, created by David Walentas; however, the development was canceled in 1999. The Walentases restored the merry-go-round over the ensuing 22 years, the culmination of which was revealed on October 13, 2006, when it was rechristened "Jane's Carousel." Jane Walentas made it known that she wanted the carousel to be given a permanent place in Brooklyn Bridge Park, going so far as to pay a $500,000 fee for a pavilion to house it designed by Pritzker Prize-winning architect Jean Nouvel. Opinions differed at the time on whether the master plan for Brooklyn Bridge Park (which abuts Empire-Fulton Ferry State Park and borders the East River) could accommodate the carousel.

On September 16, 2011, Jane's Carousel reopened in Brooklyn Bridge Park at 65 Water Street in Brooklyn. In October 2012, the carousel suffered minor water damage due to Hurricane Sandy, and the ride reopened a few months later.

== Gallery ==
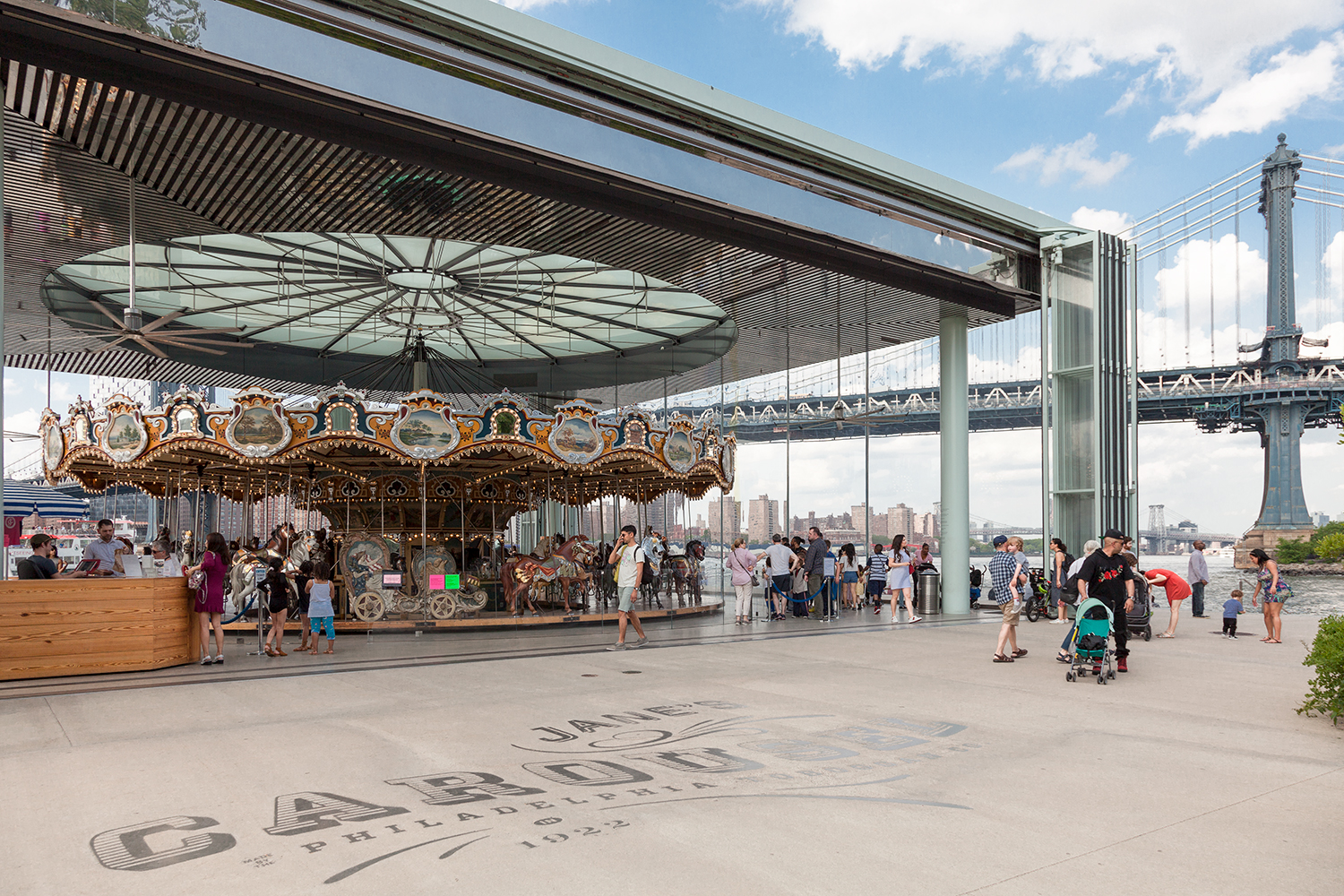
View towards Manhattan Bridge, 2019

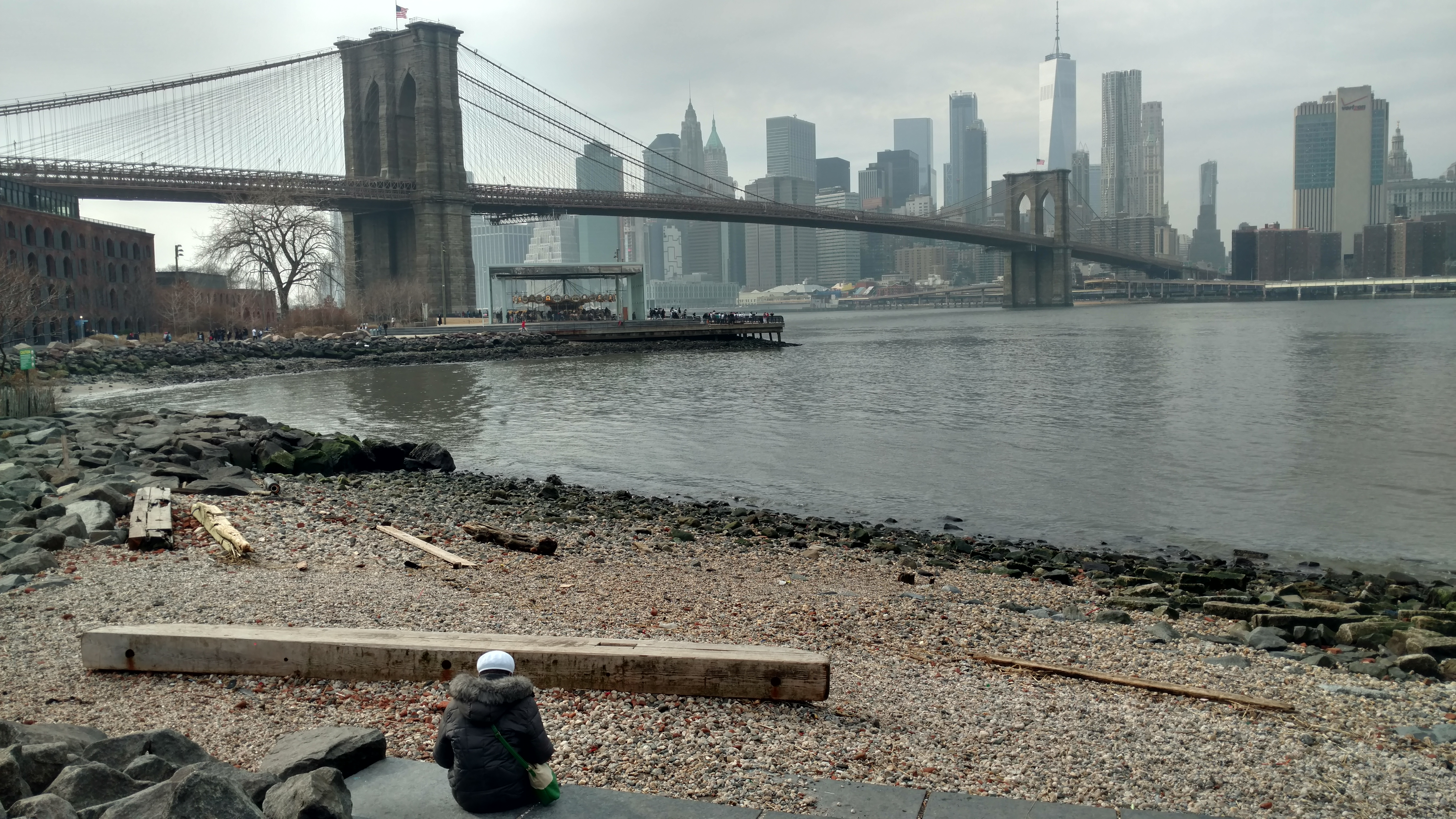
View towards Manhattan from the northern end of Brooklyn Bridge Park. Jane's Carousel is just below the bridge.

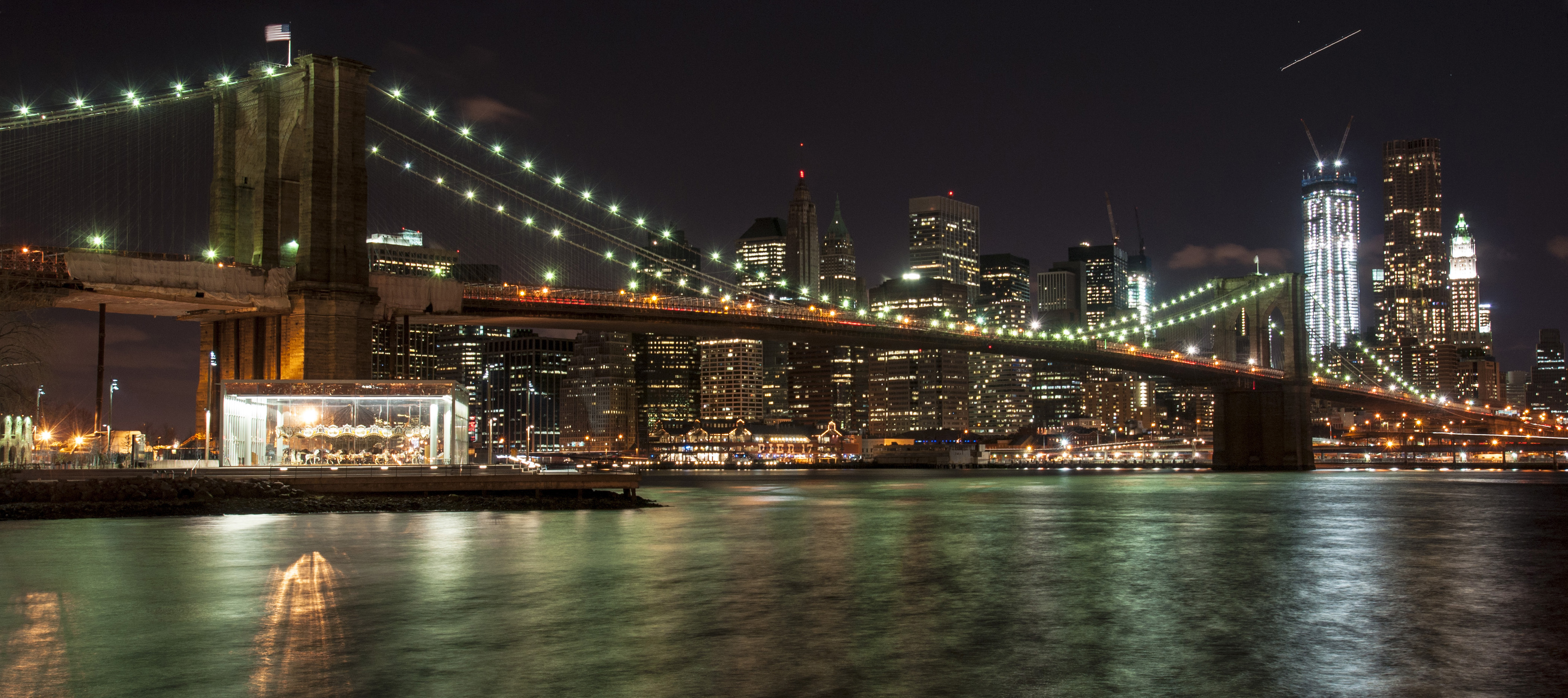
Carousel and Brooklyn Bridge at night

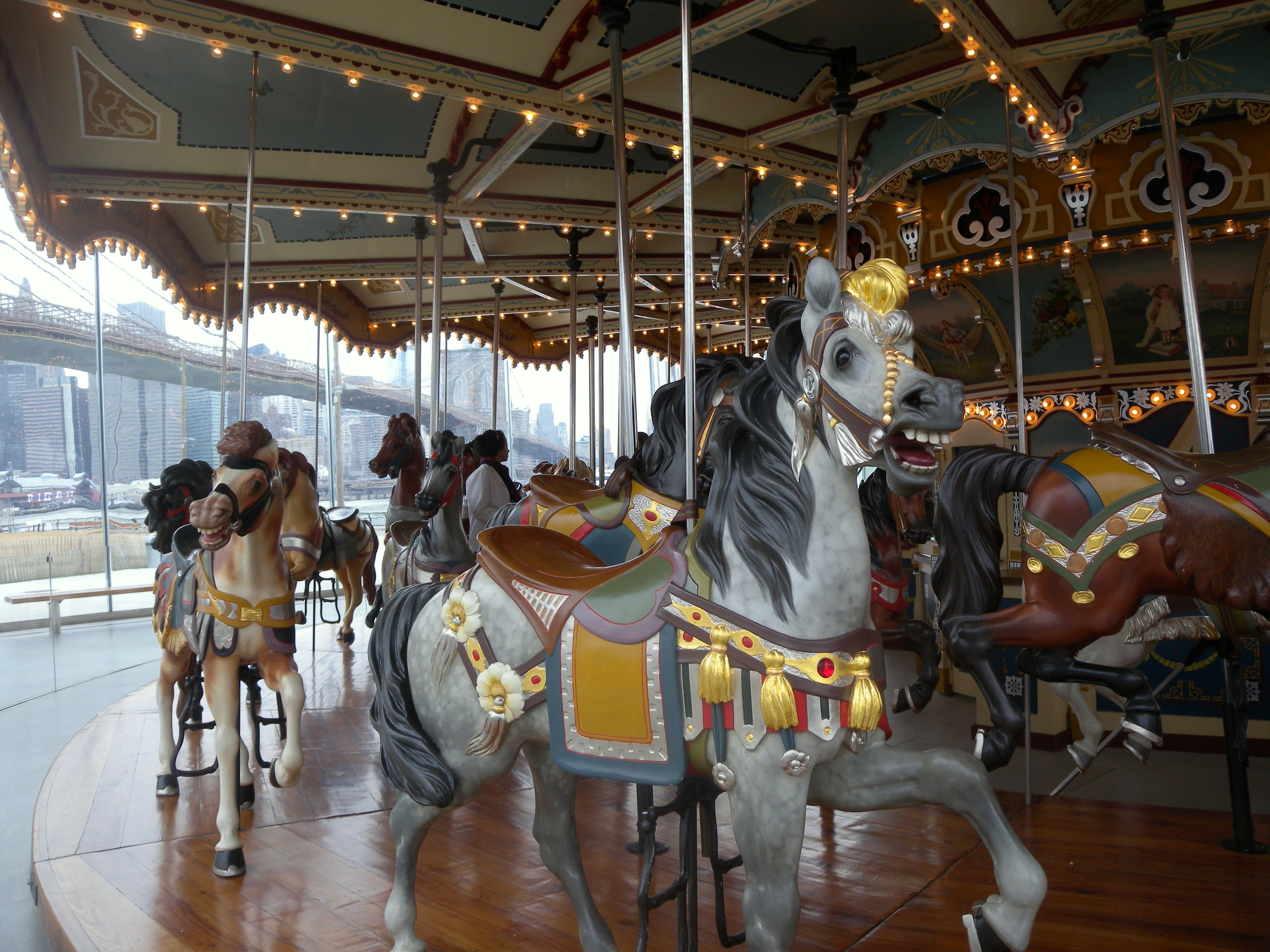
Jumper in Brooklyn

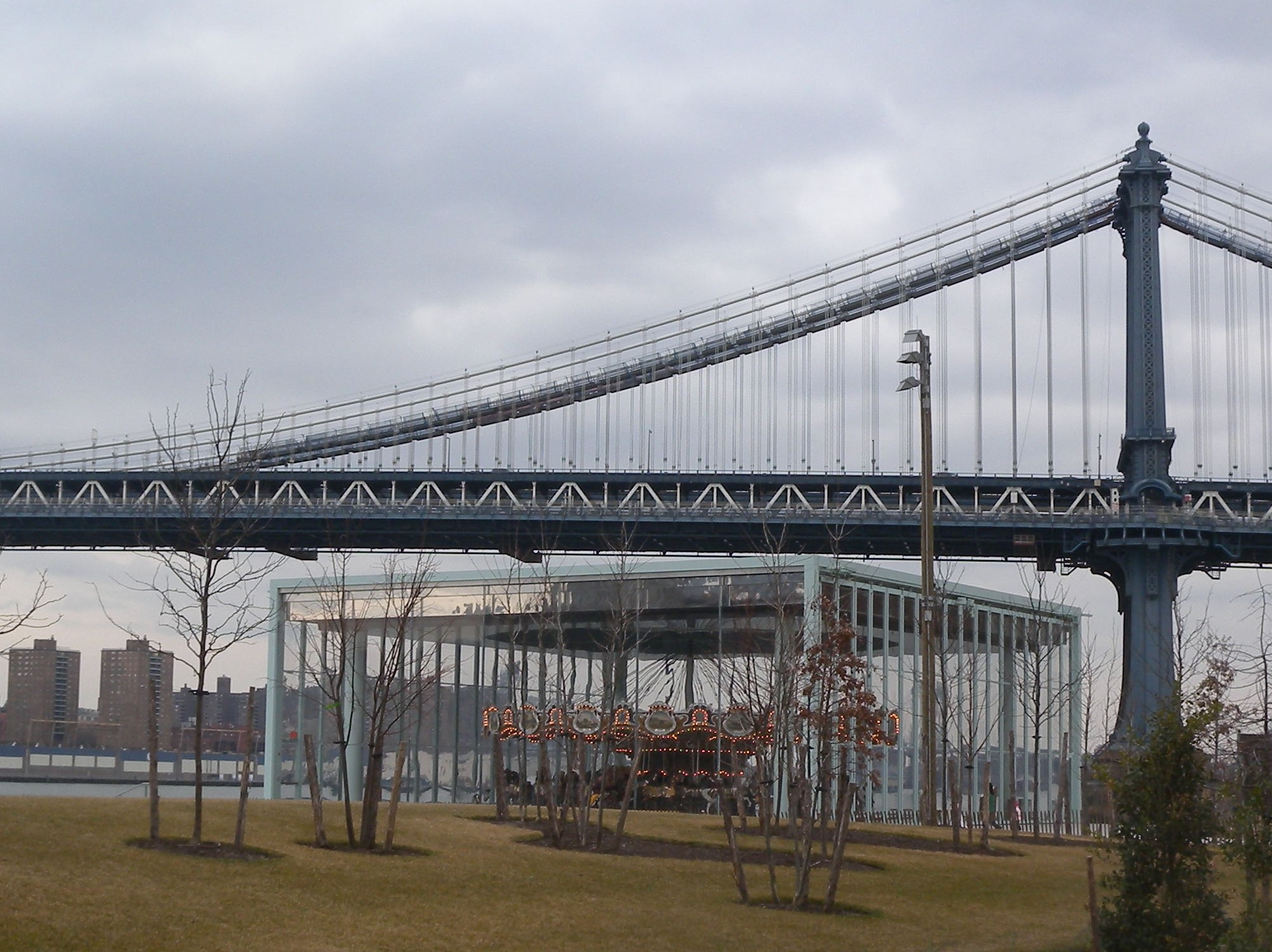
Brooklyn building

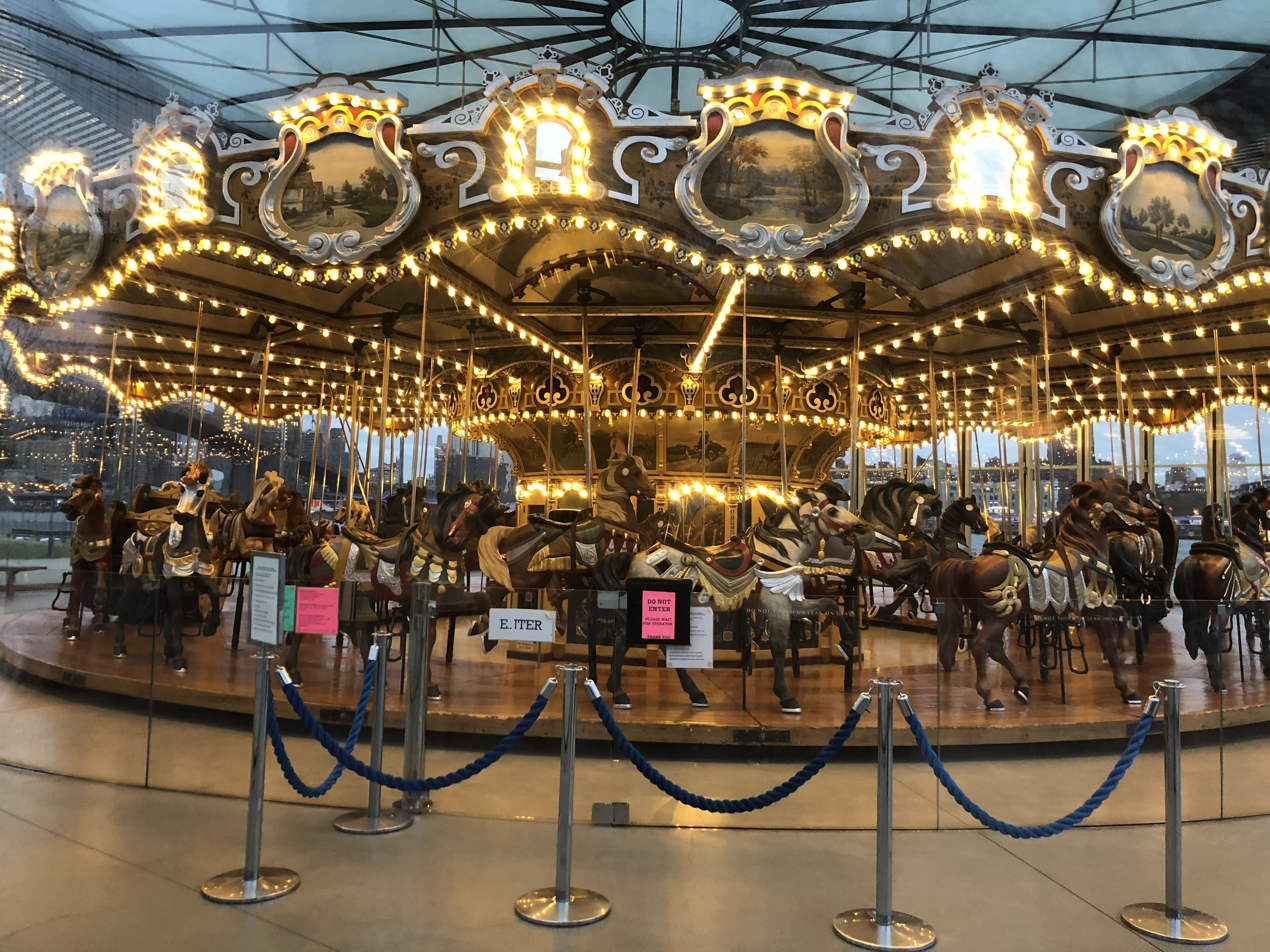
Another view of the carousel

== See also ==
- Amusement rides on the National Register of Historic Places
