= Pueblo City Park =

Park in Pueblo, Colorado

Coordinates: 38°15′50.15″N 104°39′7.63″W

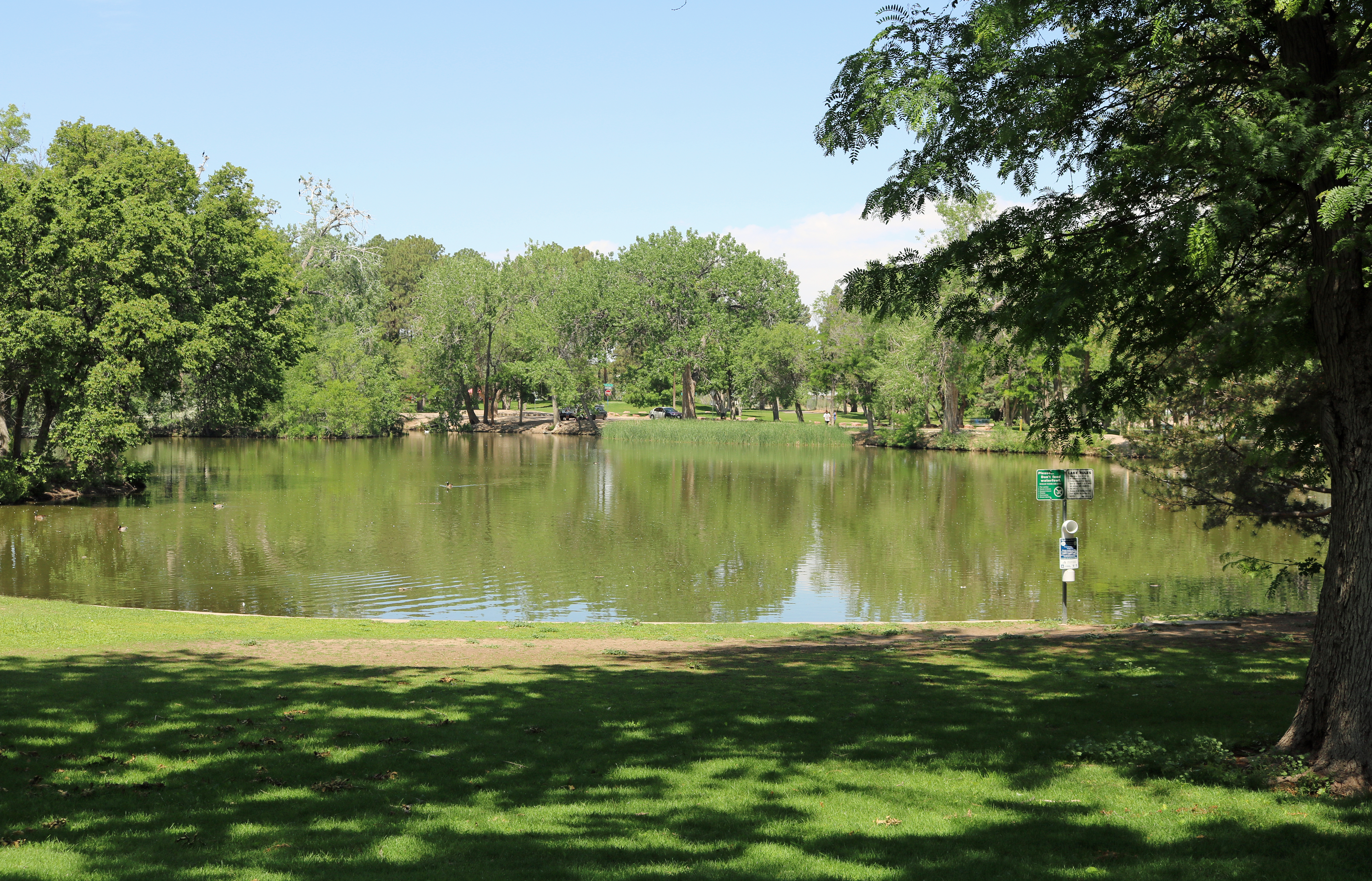
Lake Joy in Pueblo City Park

Pueblo City Park is a park established in 1904 in Pueblo, Colorado. It is managed by the Pueblo Department of Parks and Recreation. When the park first opened in 1904, the Pueblo Star-Journal published a full-page description of the park under the headline "City Park, Soon To Be Opened To The Public, Will Have The Handsomest Gates In The West."

== Park Features ==
- Pueblo City Park Carousel
- Pueblo City Park Zoo
- Pueblo City Golf Course
