= Herschel-Spillman Two-Row Portable Menagerie Carousel =

- U.S. National Register of Historic Places
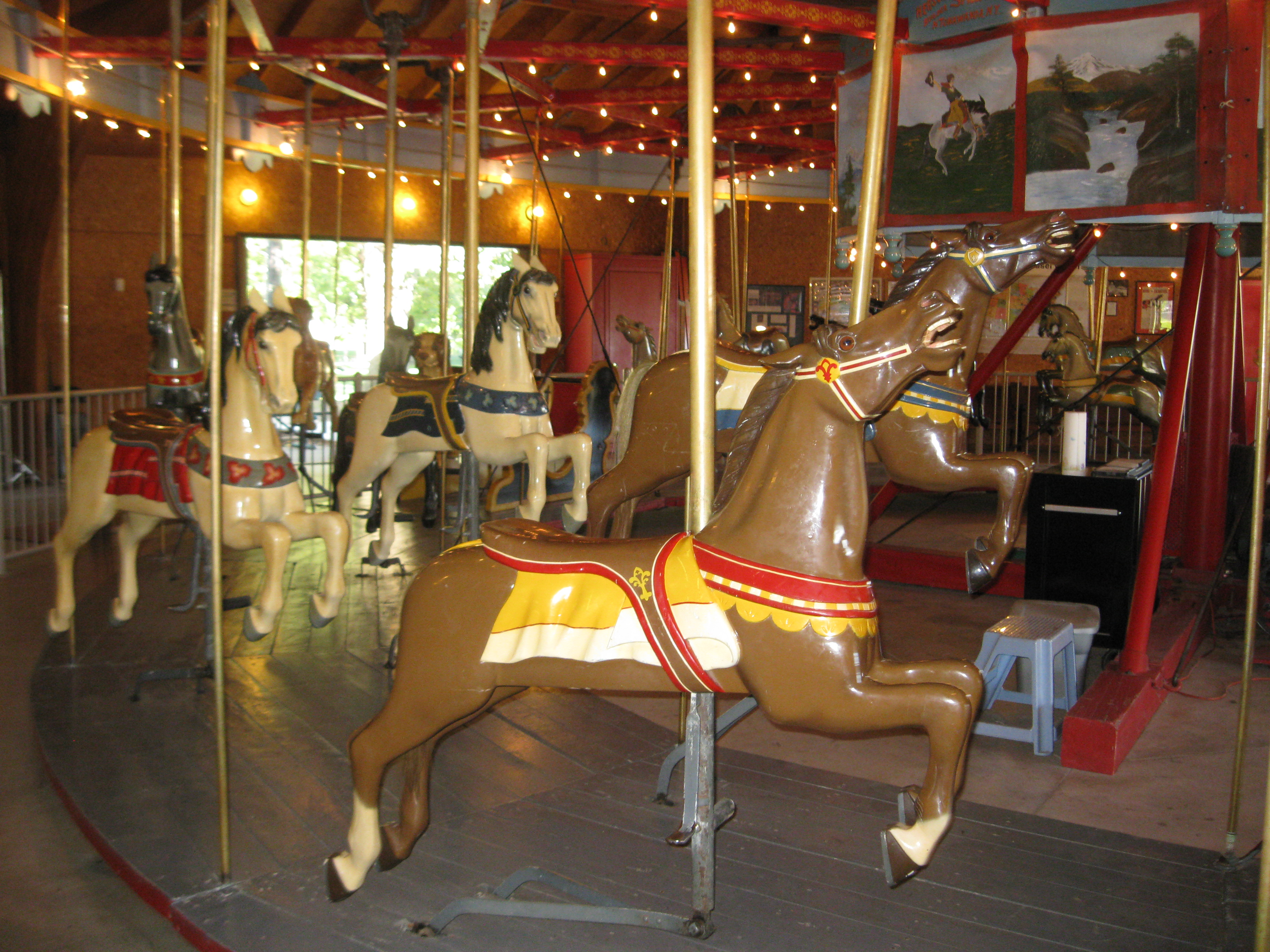

- Location within Iowa Location within the United States
- Location: North Park, Story Street, and Grove Avenue, Story City, Iowa
- Coordinates: 42°11′17″N 93°35′16″W
- Area: less than one acre
- Built: 1913
- Architect: Herschel-Spillman Company
- NRHP reference No.: 86001244
- Added to NRHP: June 6, 1986

The Herschel-Spillman Two-Row Portable Menagerie Carousel, also known as the Story City Carousel, is a historic structure located in Story City, Iowa, United States. It was created by the Herschell Spillman Company of North Tonawanda, New York in 1913, and it has been owned and maintained by the Greater Community Congress of the City of Story City since 1938. Its "menagerie" of carved figures included horses, pigs, chickens and chariots. The Uncle Sam chariot, the pig and chicken pairs, and the lovers tub are all considered rare. The carousel utilizes an under-animal scissor support system, which is an example of an earlier and simpler technology in the development of the merry-go-round. Its early history is unknown, but it was designed for temporary set-up and use.

P.T. Gifford, of Iowa Falls, at some point acquired the carousel and brought it to Story City every other year on the Fourth of July. It alternated with Eldora. The Greater Community Congress of Story City bought the carousel for $1,200 in 1938 when the usual arrangement fell through. It was stored in a local grain elevator when it was not is use until 1981 when the Greater Community Congress restored the carousel and had a pavilion built to shelter it. Butler Manufacturing Company designed the pavilion, which was completed in 1982 for $63,000. The carousel was listed on the National Register of Historic Places in 1986.

== See also ==
- Amusement rides on the National Register of Historic Places
