= New Orleans City Park Carousel and Pavilion =

Restored antique carousel in New Orleans, Louisiana

- U.S. National Register of Historic Places
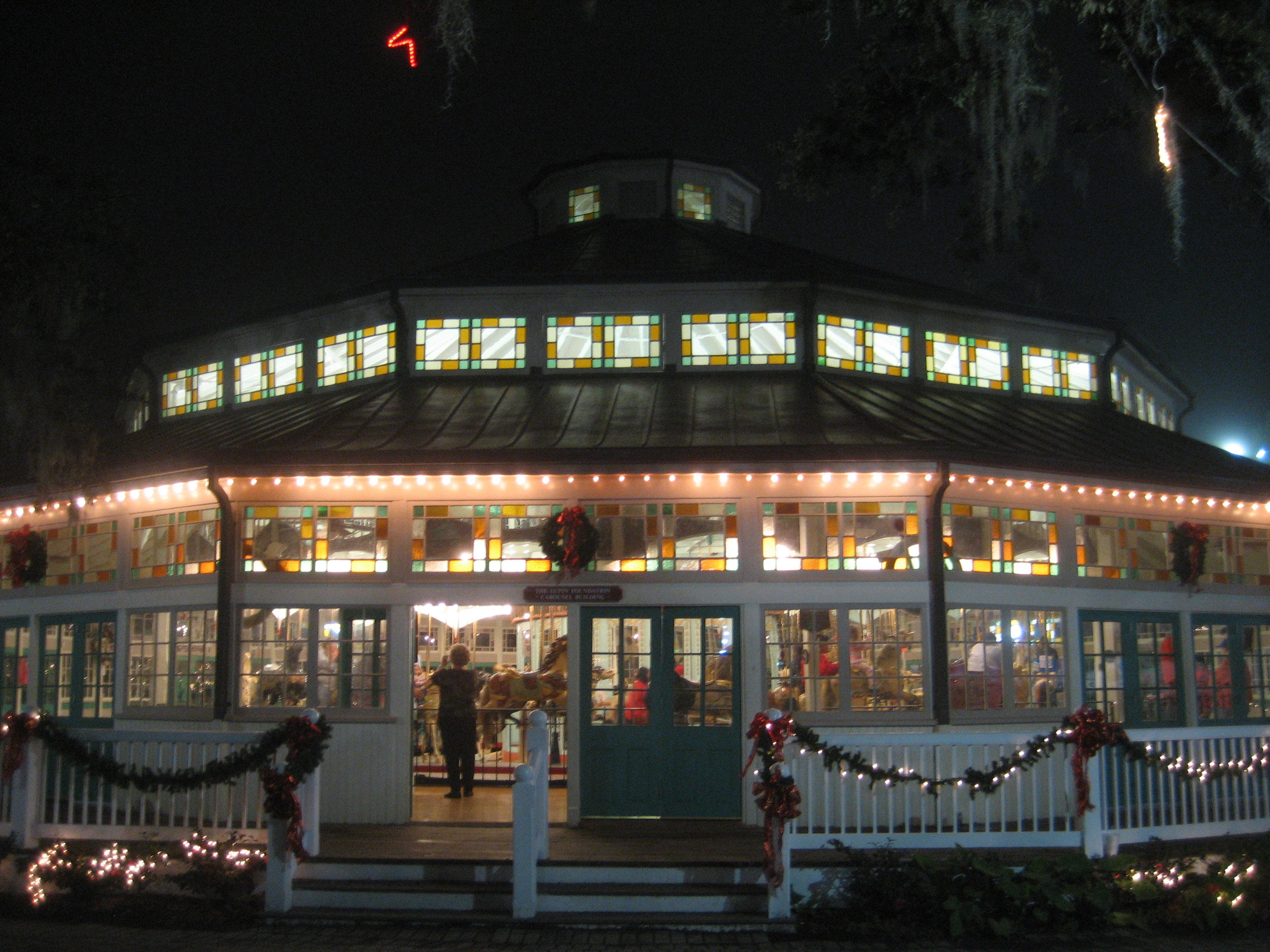
- Location: New Orleans, Louisiana
- Coordinates: 29.9877°N 90.0990°W
- Built: c. 1910
- NRHP reference No.: 86000254
- Added to NRHP: February 13, 1986

The New Orleans City Park Carousel and Pavilion is an antique carousel and shelter building in Carousel Gardens Amusement Park in New Orleans, Louisiana. The carousel was built c. 1910 and was added to the National Register of Historic Places in 1986.

== See also ==
- Amusement rides on the National Register of Historic Places
- National Register of Historic Places listings in Orleans Parish, Louisiana
