= All Hallows Guild Carousel =

- Traveling Carousel
- U.S. National Register of Historic Places
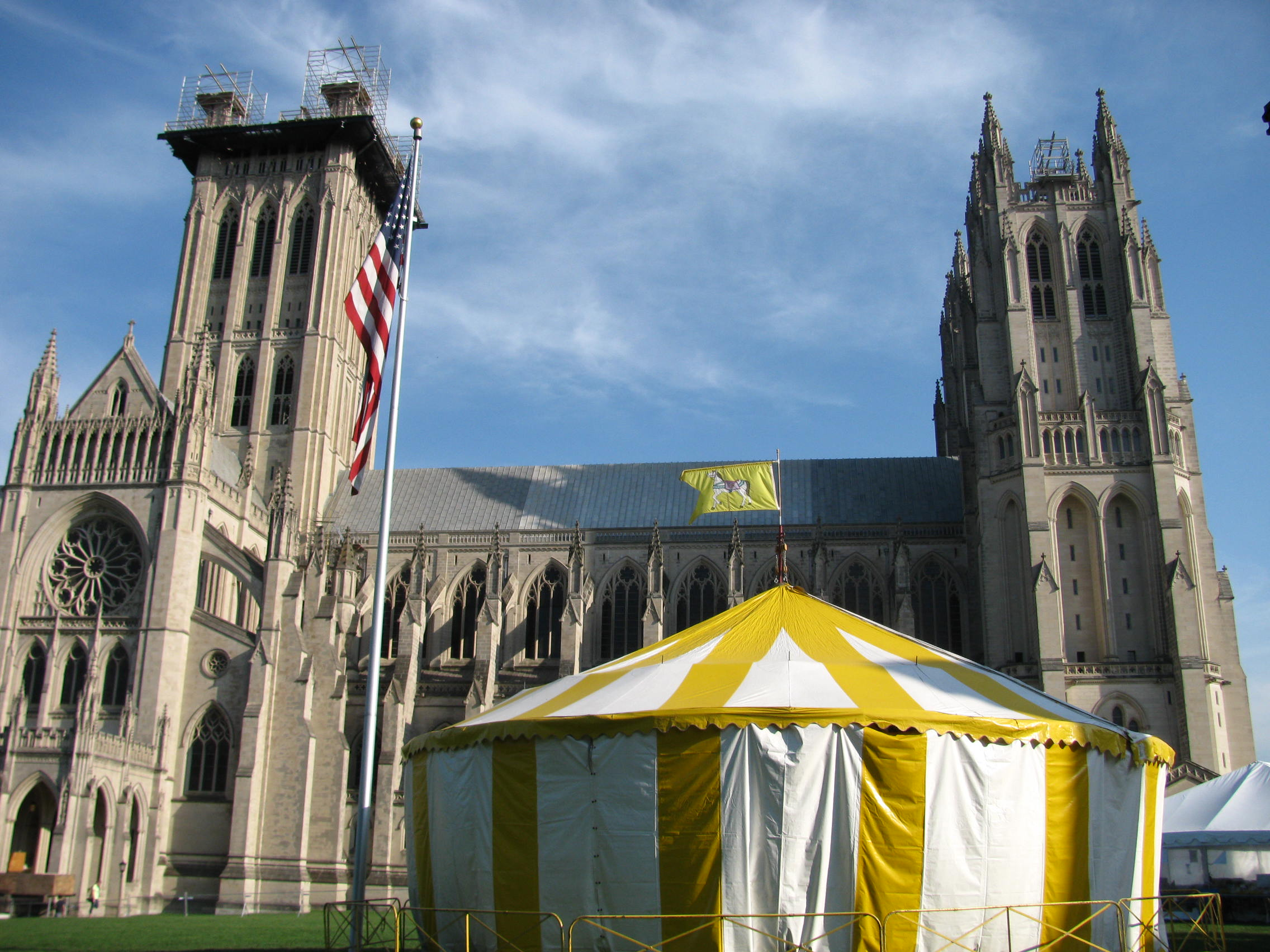
- Awaiting the opening of the Spring Flower Show, 2012

- Location within Washington, D.C. Location within the United States
- Nearest city: Washington, District of Columbia
- Coordinates: 38°55′43″N 77°4′15″W
- Area: less than one acre
- Built: 1890
- Built by: Merry-Go-Round Company of Cincinnati
- NRHP reference No.: 97001116
- Added to NRHP: September 11, 1997

The All Hallows Guild Carousel, or simply the Traveling Carousel, is a historic carousel housed at the National Cathedral in Washington, D.C. since 1963. Previously, it operated as a "county fair" carousel under Clifford Sandretzky as part of a traveling carnival based in the northern Virginia area. The carousel, constructed primarily of wood, is a rare piece believed to have been built by the Merry-Go-Round Company of Cincinnati in the 1890s. It features a unique caliola with brass pipes that was built by the Rudolph Wurlitzer Company of North Tonawanda, New York in 1937.

The original operator, Clifford Sandretzky, sold the carousel to the All Hallows Guild of the National Cathedral in 1963, and they have owned it ever since. It was used multiple times per year at fund raising events and then disassembled and stored. However, in recent years, the carousel has been assembled and used only once a year at the Guild's Spring Flower Show.

There are 24 animal figures on the carousel, along with two chariots. The animals are arranged into 12 pairs. The collection includes a single lion, zebra, and elephant, pairs of goats, camels, and deer, as well as four standing horses, and nine jumping horses. All of the figures are brightly painted and hand-carved in the European tradition.

A gasoline engine, situated near the 16-foot (4.9 m) center pole, drives the carousel. The structure is covered by a yellow and white canopy, which is topped with a small flag.

The All Hallows Guild Carousel is one of only two carousels listed on the National Carousel Census in the District of Columbia. The other, the Smithsonian Carousel on the National Mall, is a larger, non-traveling carousel with 60 wood and metal composition figures built fifty years after the All Hallows Guild Carousel.

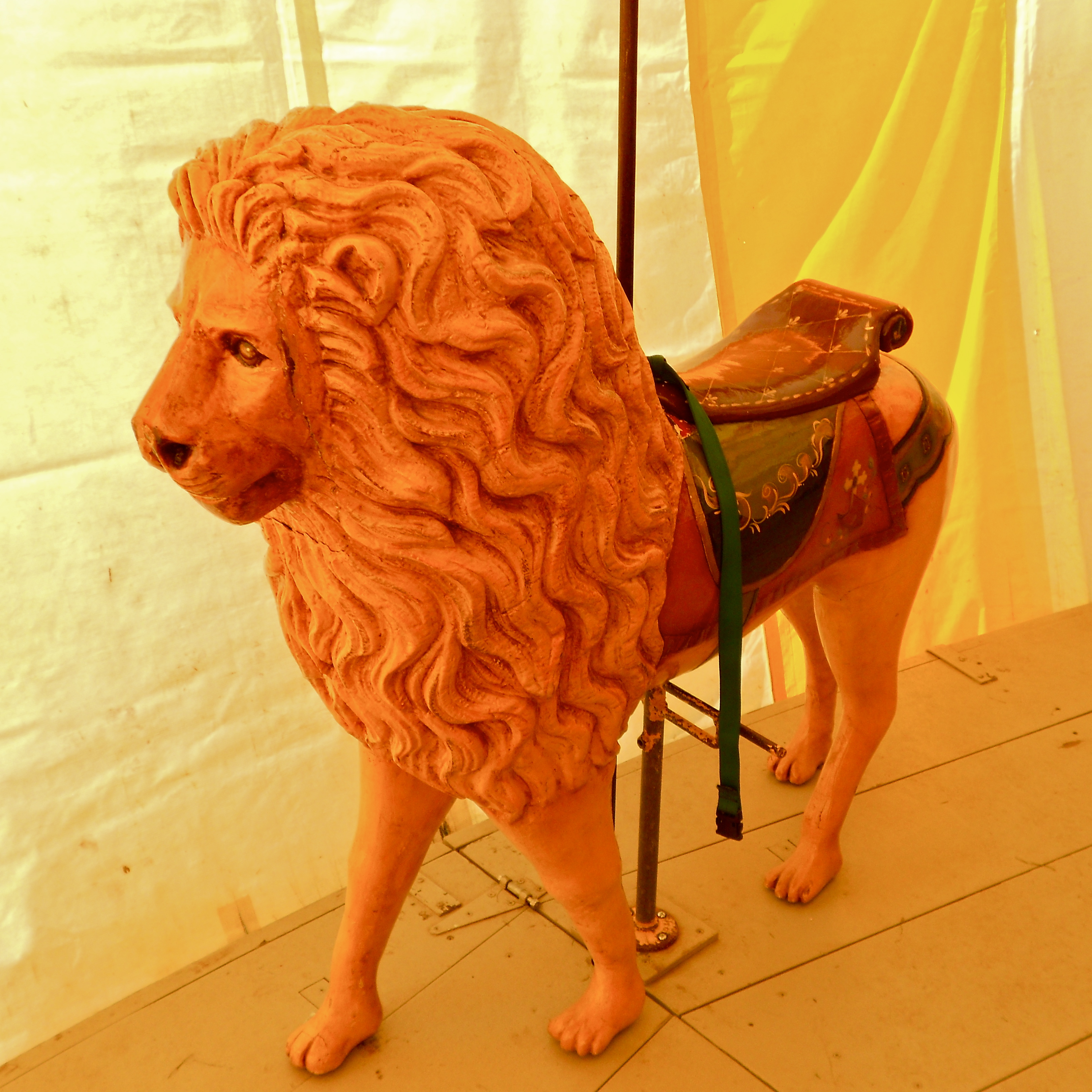
Lion figure

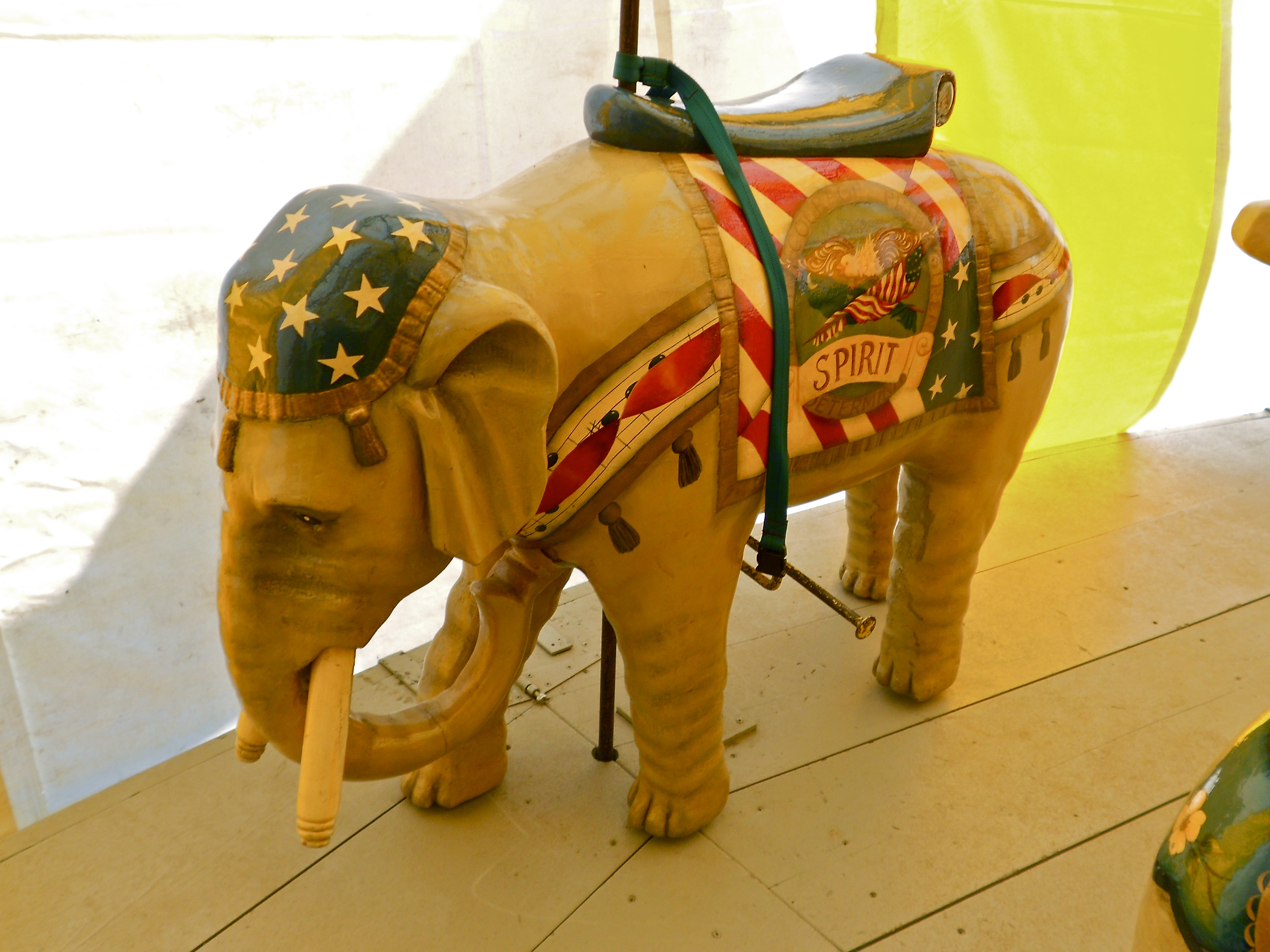
Elephant figure

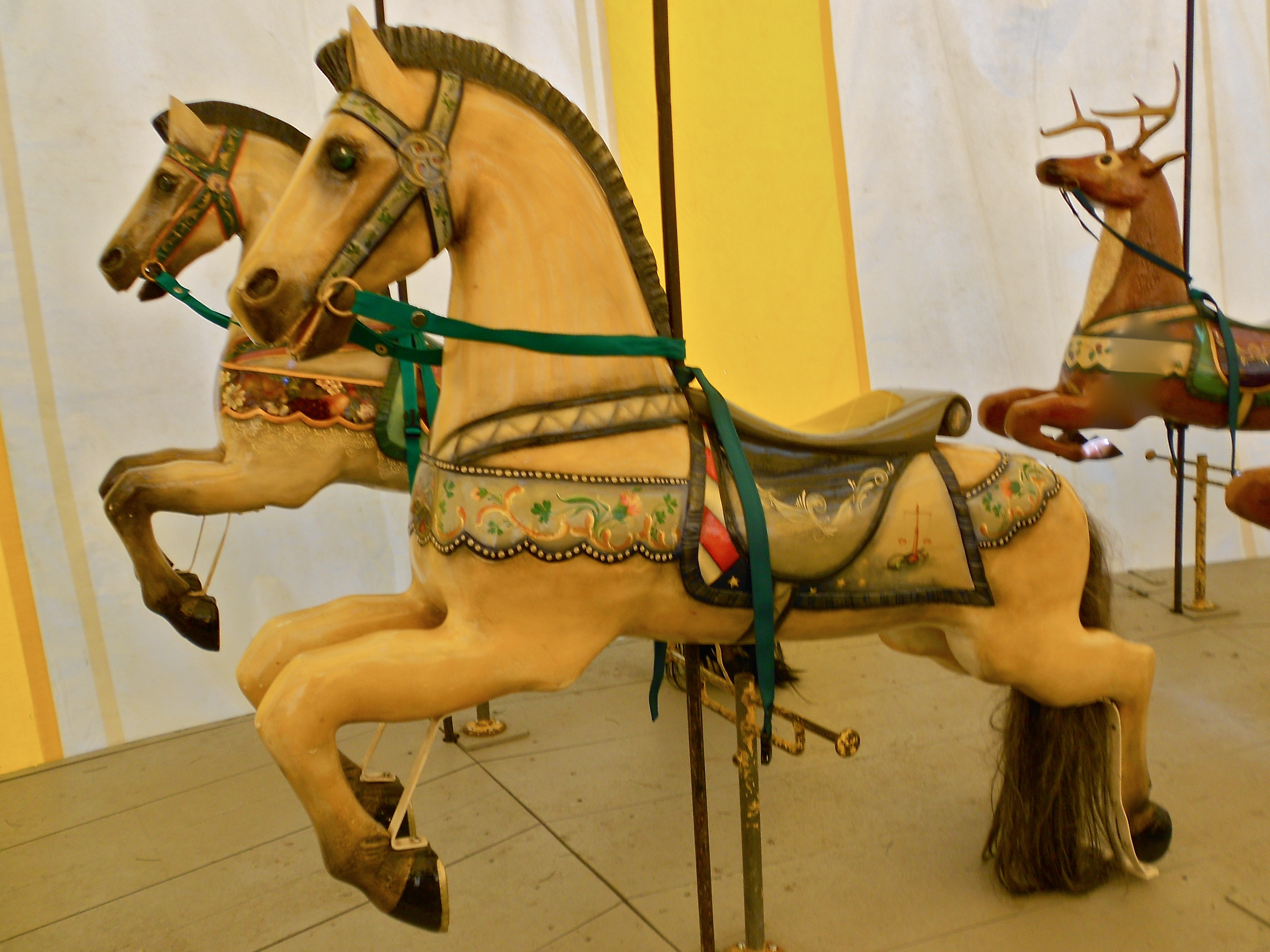
White horses

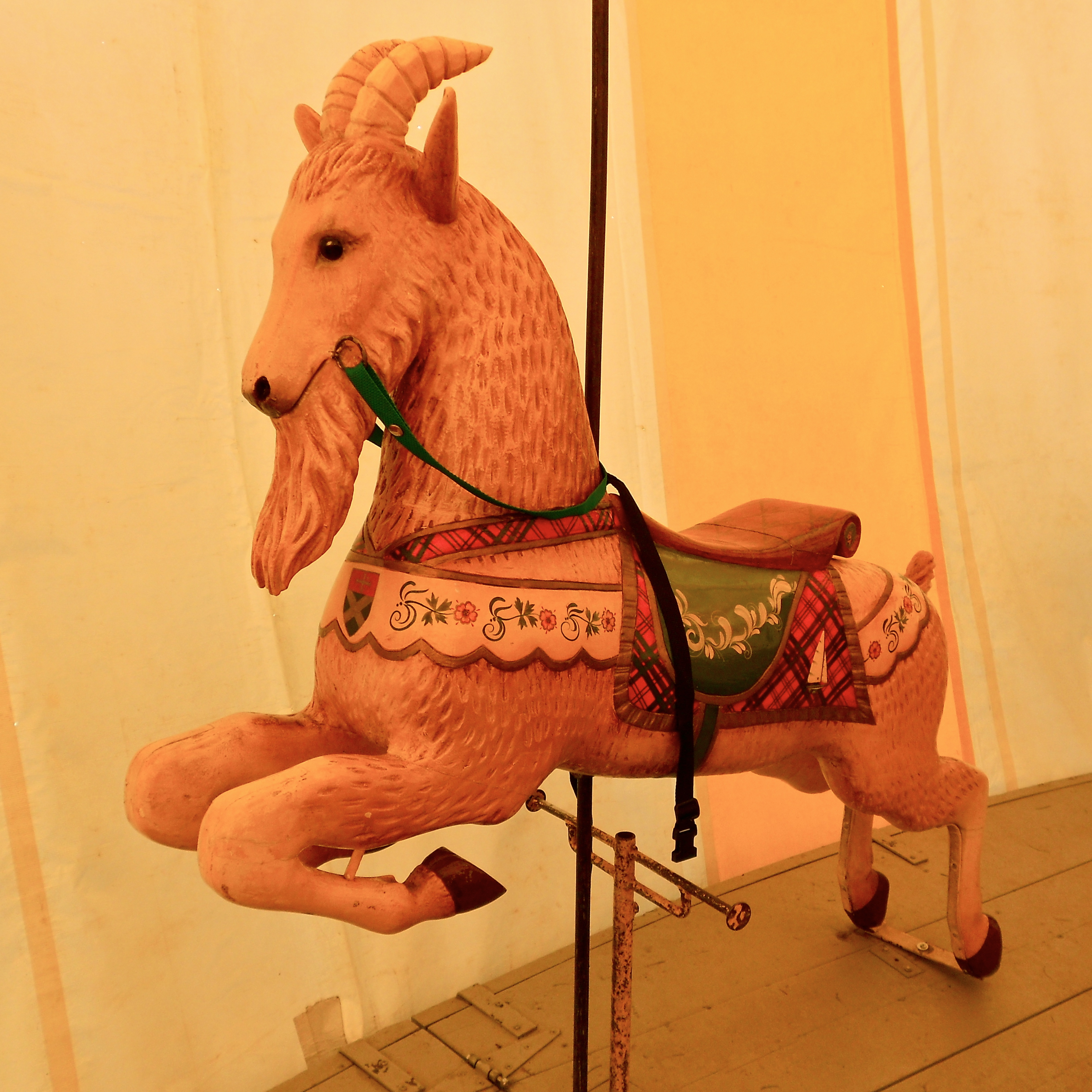
Goat

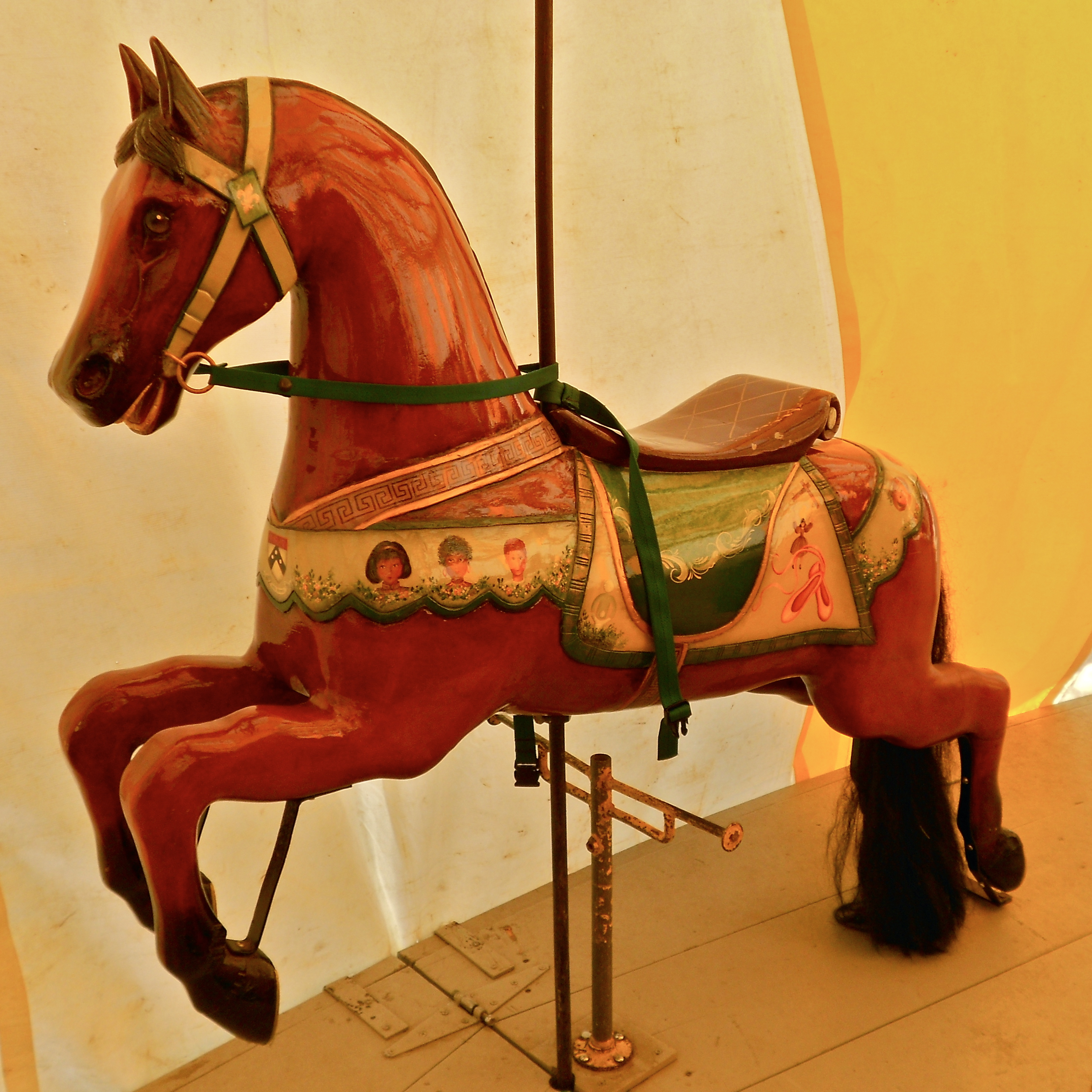
Brown horse

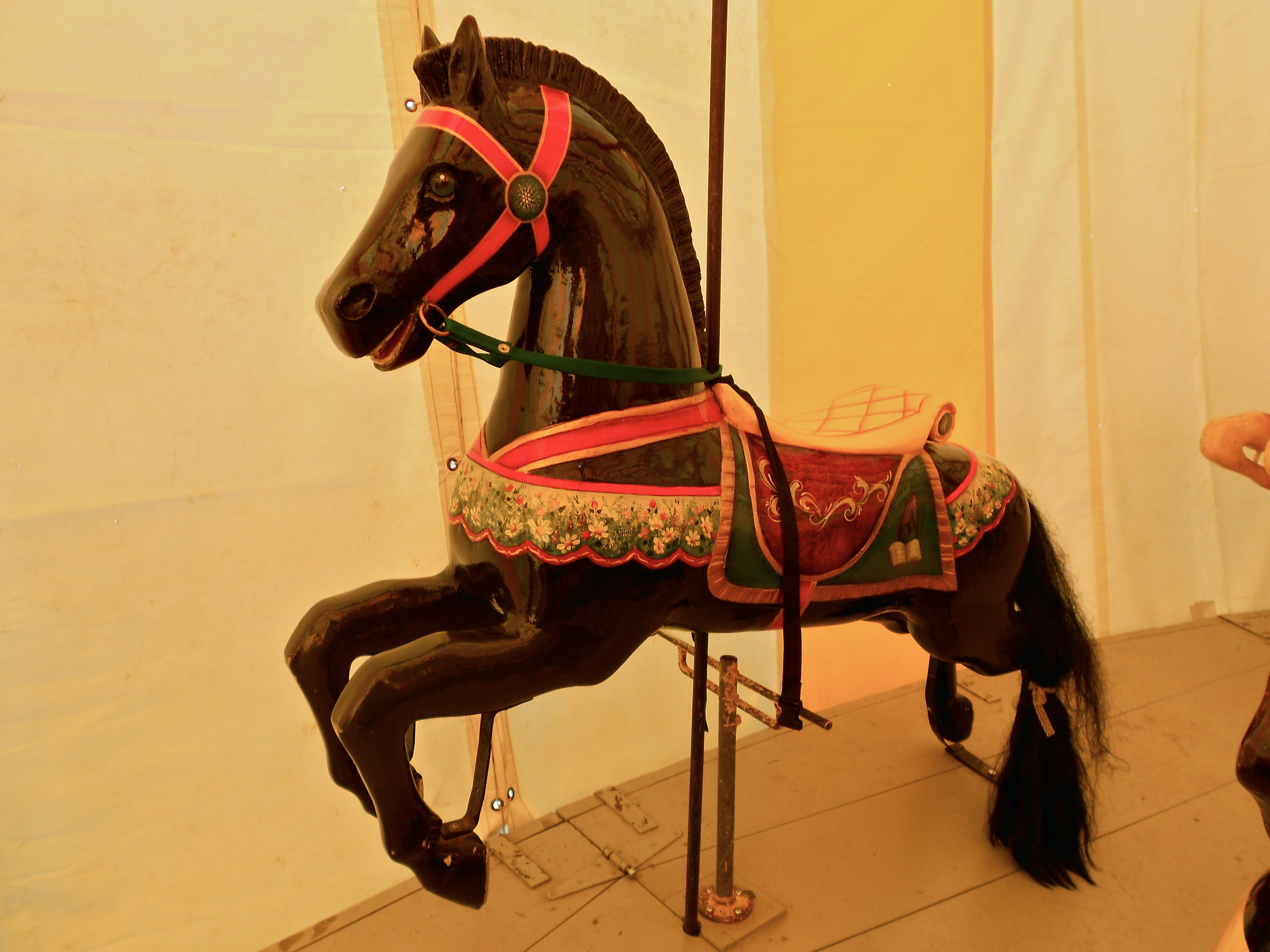
Black horse

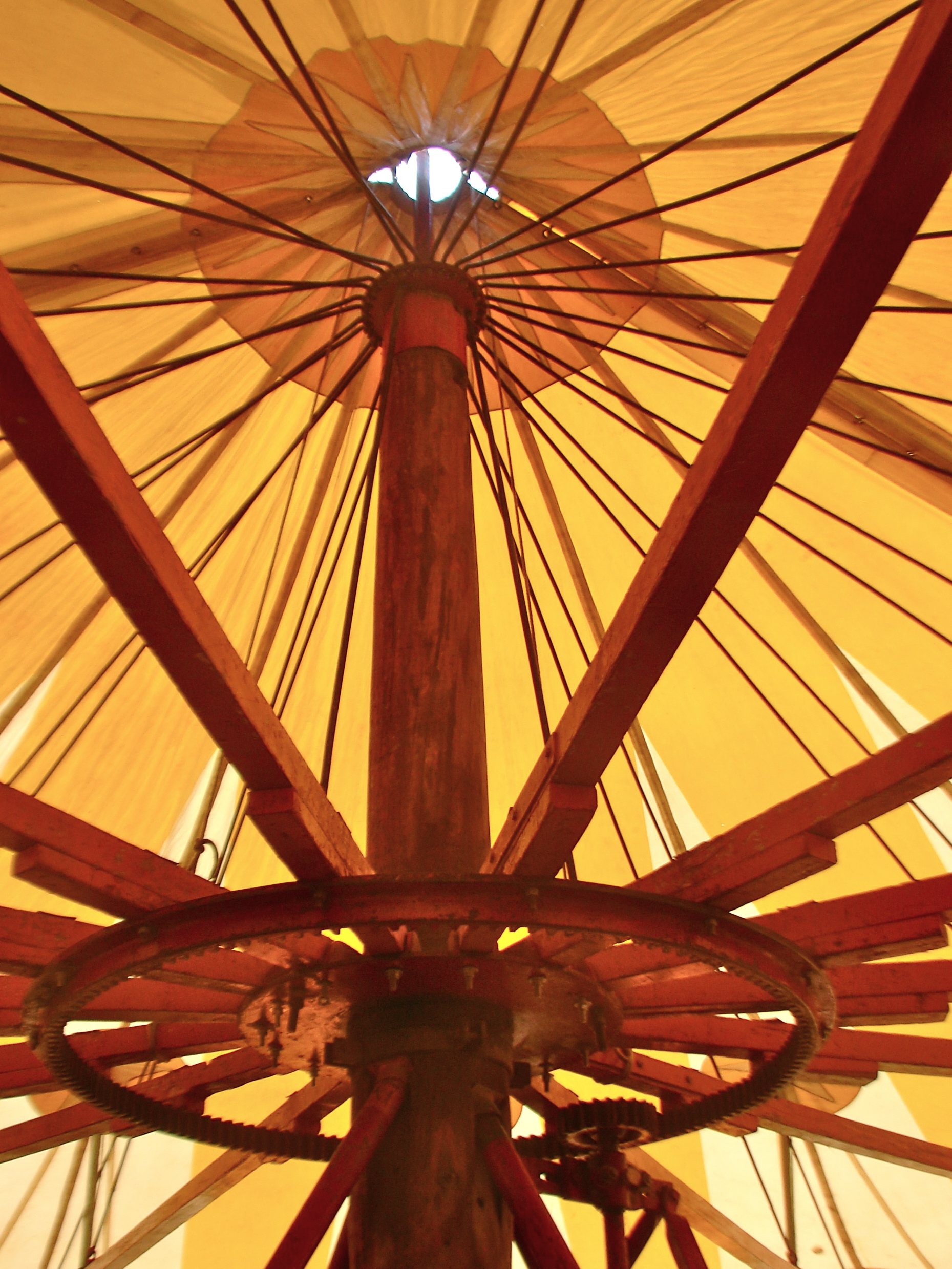
Interior of the carousel top

== See also ==
- Amusement rides on the National Register of Historic Places
