= Pueblo City Park Carousel =

- City Park Carousel
- U.S. National Register of Historic Places
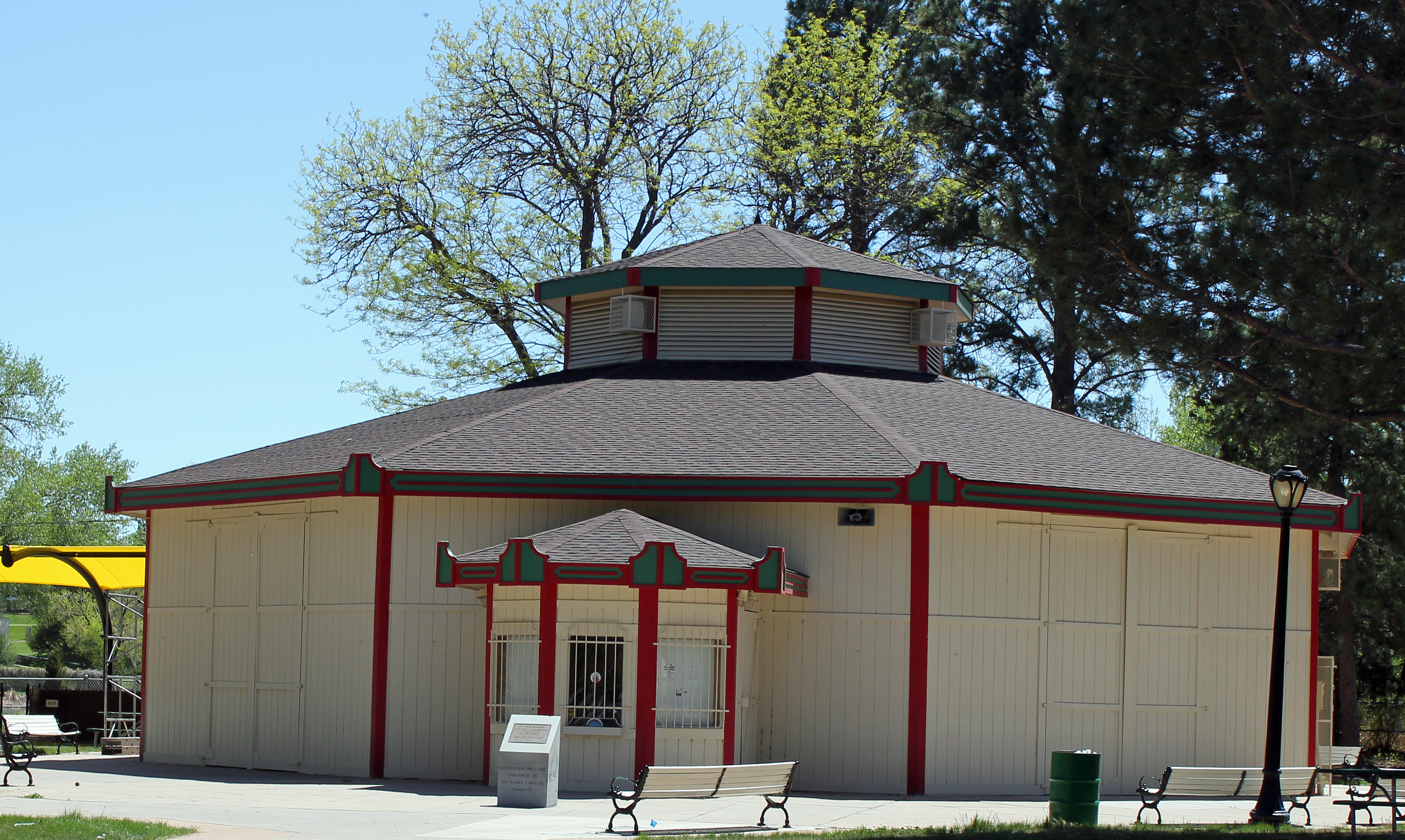
- The carousel during the off-season

- Location within Colorado Location within the United States
- Location: City Park, Pueblo, Colorado
- Coordinates: 38°15′44″N 104°39′17″W
- Area: 0.1 acres (0.040 ha)
- Built: 1911
- Architect: C. W. Parker
- NRHP reference No.: 83001297
- Added to NRHP: April 21, 1983

The Pueblo City Park Carousel is a historic carousel in Pueblo, Colorado, United States. Built in 1911, it is a Parker #72/Stein & Goldstein carousel. Its horses are believed to have been carved circa 1907. In 1983, it was listed on the National Register of Historic Places, and it is currently owned by Pueblo City Park.

== See also ==
- Amusement rides on the National Register of Historic Places
