= Carousel Gardens Amusement Park =

Amusement park

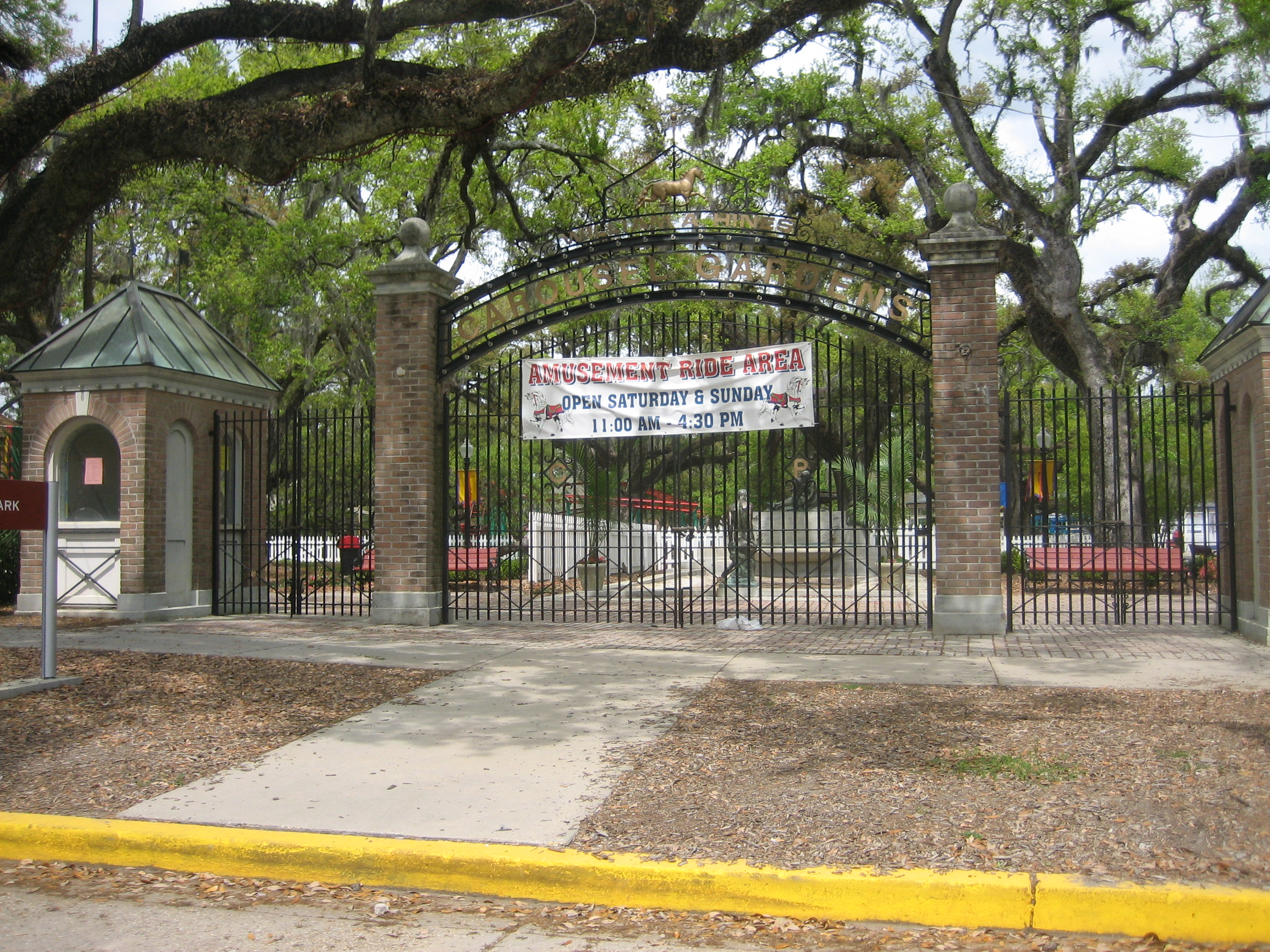
- Interactive map of Carousel Gardens Amusement Park
- Location: New Orleans, Louisiana, U.S.
- Coordinates: 29.9874°N 90.0985°W
- Opened: (Carousel moved to current location) 1928
- Operating season: Seasonal
- Area: City Park
- Website: http://neworleanscitypark.com/in-the-park/carousel-gardens

Carousel Gardens is a seasonally operated amusement park located in New Orleans, Louisiana at City Park. It features many rides, including the Live Oak Ladybug Rollercoaster, a ferris wheel, a drop tower called the Coney Tower, and a miniature train that tours the park. It is also home to the New Orleans City Park Carousel one of the oldest carousels in the US and also known as the "Flying Horses".

The park is open on the weekends and closed on holidays. In the park there are a few important rules guests are asked to follow. A few of the ones which are most emphasized are no pets or food are permitted, and to enter, wristbands are required.

== Rides and attractions ==
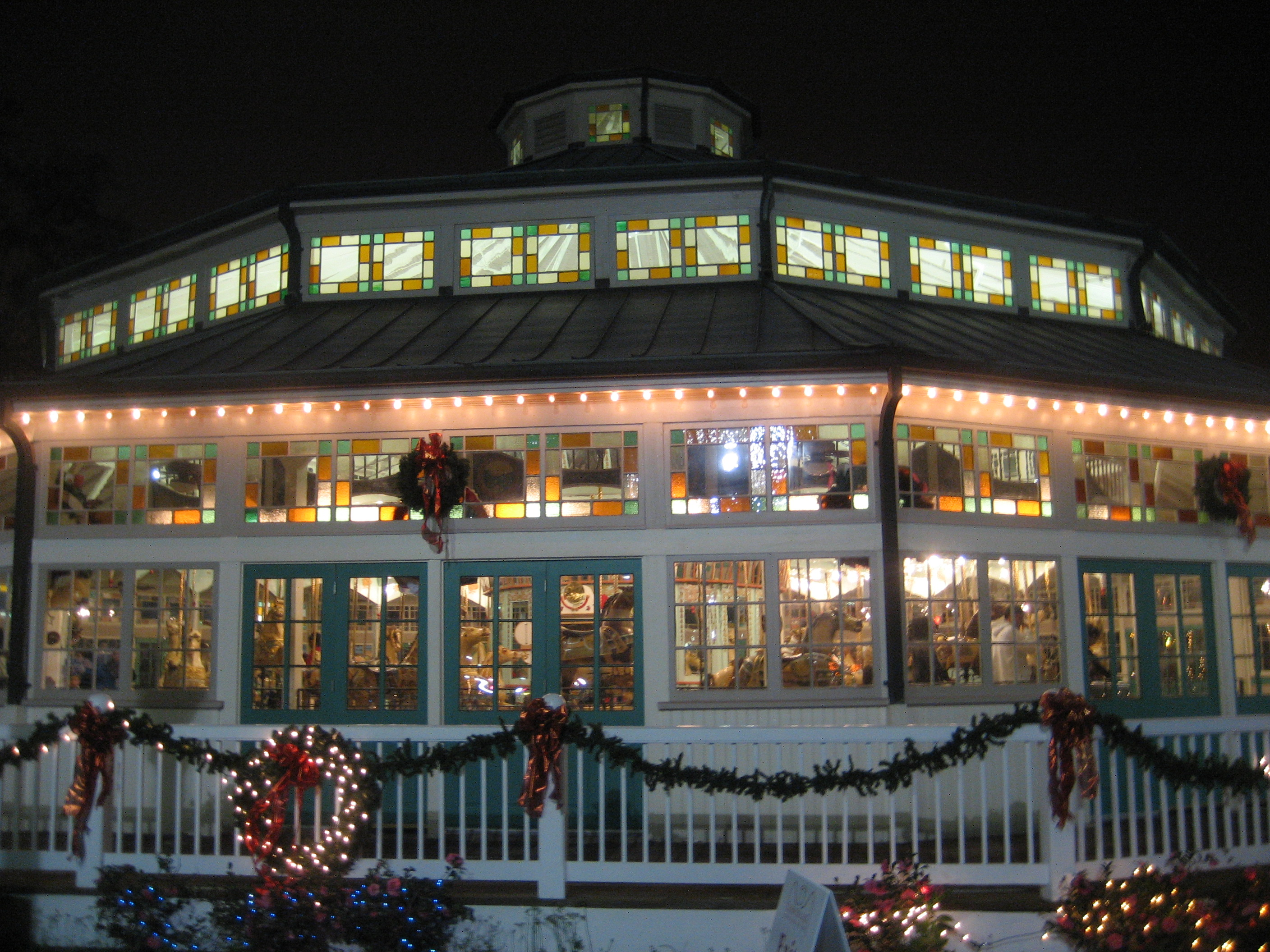
Night view of the 1906 Carousel structure

There are "…18 charming, old fashioned rides…" available to families at Carousel Gardens Amusement park|Amusement Park, but each has a height requirement, and children will be measured. The Park is mainly for families and small children and like many other amusement parks, safety is one of their priorities.

Tilt-A-Whirl	Children must be at least 46” to ride.
Bumper Cars	Children must be at least 48” to ride.
Ferris wheel	Children must be at least 48” to ride.
Scrambler	Children must be at least 48” to ride.
Train	Children must be at least 48” and the price of each ticket is $5/ ride
Fun Slide	Children must be at least 42” to ride or accompanied by a parent.
Rockin' Tug	Children must be at least 42” to ride or accompanied by a parent.
Coney Tower	Children must be at least 42” to ride.
New Orleans City Park Carousel	Children must be at least 42” or accompanied by an adult. The carousel is also known as the "Flying Horses' and is also the main attraction at the park.
Construction Zone	Children must be at least 36” to ride or accompanied by a parent.
Slime Buckets	Children must be at least 36” to ride or accompanied by a parent.
Monkey Jump	Children must be at least 36” to ride.
Red Barron	Children must be at least 36” to ride.
Umbrella cars	Children must be at least 36” to ride.
Lady Bug Rollercoaster	Children must be at least 52” to ride.
Music Express	Children must be at least 52” to ride.

*Carousel Gardens is located in New Orleans City Park, which means it is also connected with nearby attractions/ Venues also located in that park such as Storyland, Train Garden, City Put, etc.

== History ==
The park itself (City Park, which is where Carousel Gardens Amusement Park is located) has been running for about 150 years as of 2017. The famous carousel located in Carousel Gardens Amusement Park has been running for over 100 years. The antique carousel is the oldest ride in the park, otherwise known as the "Flying Horses", which has been around since 1906 is the main attraction and still uses the same motor. The carousel was moved to its current location in 1928. A Wurlitzer #150 Band Organ provides the carousel's music. This antique carousel is one out of 100 hand-carved carousels left in the United States and is the only one left in Louisiana. Some of the figurines on the rollercoaster have been around for even longer since they were created in 1885. On the carousel, there are 56 figurines altogether, 53 are animals and two are chariots. All of the figurines were carved and hand painted by two men: Charles Looff and Charles Carmel. Charles Looff is the most famous of the two for creating the carousel figurines. Looff was an American immigrant and a mast carver- carousel builder. During his lifetime, Looff created over 50 carousels, amusement parks, rollercoasters and Ferris wheels. Charles Carmel was one of quite a few carousel builders who were inspired by and learned from Looff. Carmel started off working with Looff, then moved on to work on his own. A few of the most distinctive things about his work are usually seen on the tongue and blanket of the horses, as well as the armor of the horses. The Looff figurines are older than the Caramel figurines and they contain faux gemstones. A few of the many things that make these figurines unique are that a few of the animals have heads that move, all of the horses have real horse hair in their tails, and the lion figurines weigh about 500 pounds. A few movies, television shows, and commercials have been based around this historic carousel. One of the earliest listed movies shot at this location was in 2008–2009, called Living Proof, along with many others including Now You See Me and 22 Jump Street in 2013, all the way through 2014. Some well-known television shows which have been filmed at this carousel as well are NCIS: New Orleans and American Horror Story. A few commercials which have also filmed at this location are from Nike, Adidas, and Toyota.

== Passes and events ==
Carousel Gardens Amusement Park offers season passes and venues to host birthday parties. With the wristband, guests are able to get unlimited rides in Carousel Gardens and the nearby Storyland Park. The passes last from one year to the date that they were purchased. The passes are valid during celebrations and they provide guests with 20% off boat and bicycle rentals as well.

Since Carousel Gardens is located in City Park it is one of the venues that the park offers parties to groups of 25–50 guests for two hours. The park provides all the necessary seating, supplies, etc. Each party gets two picnic tables, choice of pizza or sandwiches, plus muffins and ice cream, unlimited drinks (if the venue is indoors there are more options), plus coffee service, and all necessary paper products. There are indoor and outdoor venues available. A few recommended venues are Storyland, City Putt, Parkview Terrace, Peristyle, Reunion Shelter, Shelter, #1, *Carousel Gardens, Botanical Garden, and Garden Study Center and Lath House. Activities differ for each venue and all safety rules still apply.

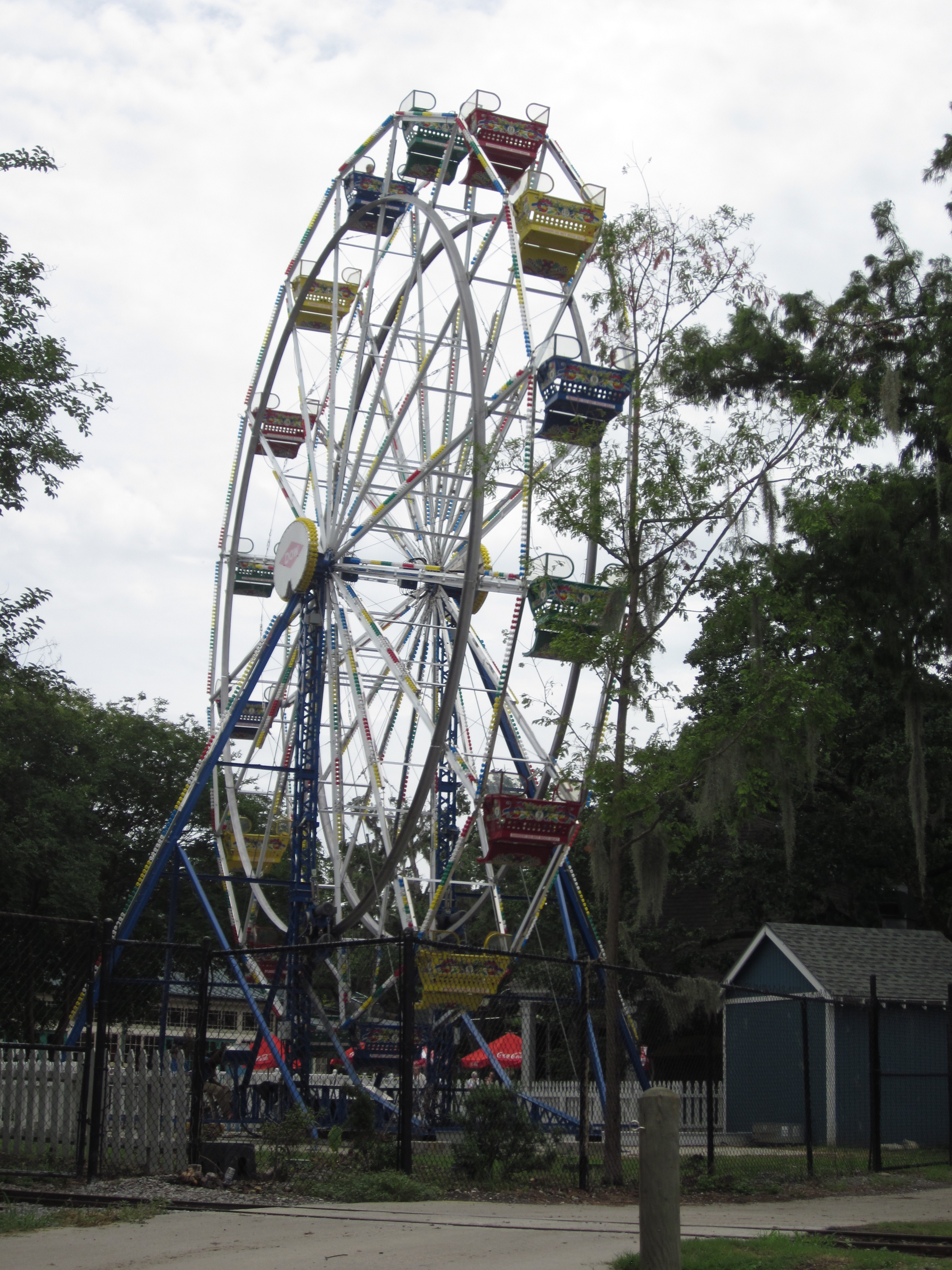
Carousel Gardens Ferris Wheel

Aside from personal parties and birthdays, there are celebration events the park puts on. These events and celebrations are for families; however, some events cater to adults as well. These specific events are held close to holidays and other special occasions. The main one that is put on for families is the whole City Park (all the parks and venues included along with Carousel Gardens) is Celebration in the Oaks.

== Reviews ==
The park has received a lot of feedback and many reviews from guests. On the bottom of the main page, there is a section called "Park Talk" and it gives reviews about City Park in general, but it is possible to keep scrolling through and find some comments specific to the Carousel Gardens Amusement Park as well. Many call City Park "worth seeing" or New Orleans "best kept secret" in an effort to describe how positive they feel about the park. Others call it "beautiful, magical" and "one of their favorite places to visit". There is plenty to do and people talk about wanting more time to visit, or the ability to come back again. People go on to talk about the antique "classy" carousel and how the park is a place to make memories with the whole family. The historical features of the park are also what draw a lot of guests in. There are many comments on things like the beauty of the old trees and the antique carousel itself. Multiple guests have enjoyed the parties there and others say it is "not only beautiful, but peaceful" and a great place to "get away from the city traffic". Other pages have mostly good things to say about the park too, some people comment on how some of things in the park are definitely for younger children (which was the extent of the negative comments), but say nevertheless, was a nice place to visit and to spend time with family.

An article was published in the NY Times by Amy Tara Koch which mentions Carousel Gardens Amusement Park. This article compares Carousel Gardens (along with other parks and locations) to a vacation spot such as Disney World. She gave her opinion about why she would prefer a park like this to a park like Disney and gave her opinion in the form of a review of each park. First of all, price is mentioned in the article and she says compared to somewhere like Disney, it is not so expensive. She also enjoys the historical and educational aspect of a vacation spot and with the park's "...century old hand painted, wooden carousel", the park has that historical aspect. She goes on to describe how to make a day of it based on other nearby activities and businesses.
