= Brass ring =

Small grabbable ring that a dispenser presents to a carousel rider

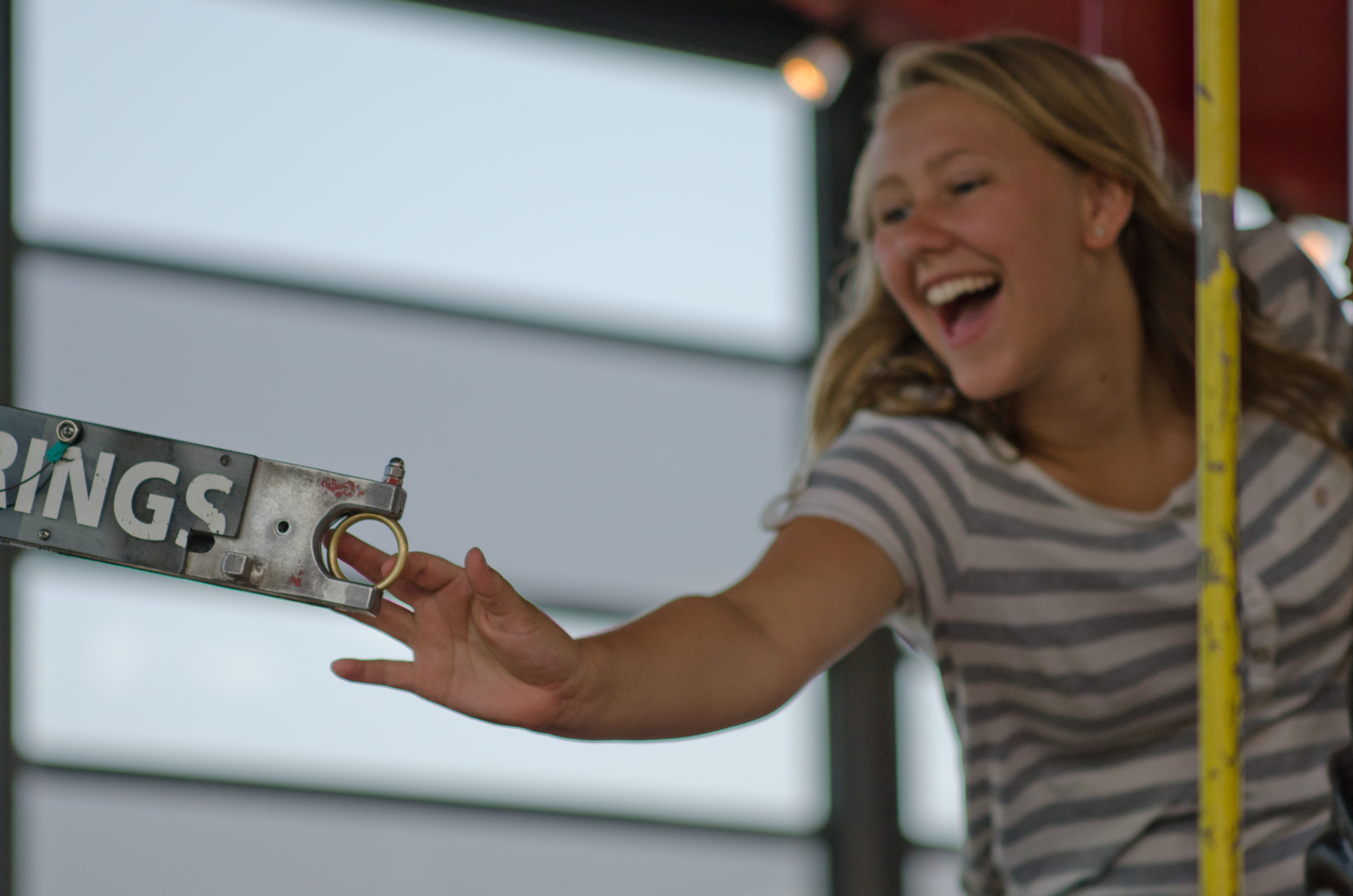
Catching the brass ring

A brass ring is a small, grabbable ring that a dispenser presents to a carousel rider during the course of a ride. These dispensers are filled with a large number of iron or steel rings and a single or a few brass rings. The rings can then be tossed at a target as the carousel rotates. Typically, a brass ring can be traded for a prize, which is often a free repeat ride. Although they were standard features for carousels during their heyday in the late 19th and early 20th centuries, brass ring dispensers are now rare. The figurative phrase to grab the brass ring is derived from this device.

== Background ==
Brass ring dispenser on arm end, from the carousel at Glen Echo Park

The general concept of obtaining rings while riding carousels originates from ring jousting competitions in Europe in the 17th century. Carousels were first developed during the late 17th century to allow participants in these competitions to practice ring jousting without overworking their horses.

Brass ring devices were prevalent during the heyday of the carousel from the 1870s to the early 1930s, and the first references to brass rings appeared in the 1890s. They were meant to encourage carousel riders to sit on the outermost row of carousel animals, which were often stationary. While a carousel is in motion, riders on the outermost row can grab rings dispensed from a wooden arm suspended near them. To discourage riders from keeping these rings as souvenirs, images such as clown's mouths and lion's mouths are placed as targets adjacent to the carousel at which the rider's rings can be thrown. Most rings are iron or steel, but one or two per ride are made of brass; if a rider manages to grab a brass ring, it can often be redeemed for a free ride.

== Brass ring carousels today ==
It used to be that you'd fall off a horse (reaching for a ring), pick yourself up and get back on. These days you fall off, pick yourself up and go to the nearest attorney.

— Carol Perron of the Perron family, historic carousel preservationists, 1990

Although there are many carousels in operation today, those that still use brass ring dispensers are very rare. The need for carousel riders to position themselves at wide angles to reach for rings from a ring dispensing arm often leads to lost balance and falls off of the ride, leading to personal injury lawsuits and hence their avoidance by most modern operators.

Operating carousels that use brass ring dispensers
Name	Location	Image	Builder	Date	Notes/Updates
Balboa Park Carousel	Balboa Park, San Diego, California		Herschell–Spillman	1910	
Santa Cruz Looff Carousel	Santa Cruz Beach Boardwalk, Santa Cruz, California		Looff	1911	
Lenny & Joe's Magical Fish Tale Carousel	Lenny & Joe's Fish Tale, Madison, Connecticut		Dentzel	1999	
The Carousel of Old Lyme	Old Lyme, Connecticut		Herschell–Spillman	1925	
Cass County Dentzel Carousel	Riverside Park, Logansport, Indiana		Dentzel	c. 1900–1903	Also known as the Spencer Park Dentzel Carousel
Flying Horses	Oak Bluffs, Massachusetts		Dare	1876	
A Carousel for Missoula	Caras Park, Missoula, Montana		Volunteer-built	2001	
Eldridge Park Carousel	Eldridge Park, Elmira, New York		Looff	1924 (2006)	Original carousel mechanism was built in the 1890s and installed in Elmira in 1924. The original animals were auctioned in 1989, and replacement antique horses were acquired starting in 2003.
Nunley's Carousel	Museum Row, Garden City, New York		Stein & Goldstein Artistic Carousell Manufacturing Company	1912	Formerly located in Nunley's in Baldwin, New York
Northrop Grumman Carousel	Mitchell Park, Greenport, New York		Herschell–Spillman	1920	
Grand Carousel	Knoebels Amusement Resort, Elysburg, Pennsylvania		Kremer's Carousel Works/Carmel	1913	
Weona Park Carousel	Pen Argyl, Pennsylvania		Dentzel	1917	One of only two remaining stationary Dentzel menagerie carousels with original factory paint on the carousel figures
Crescent Park Looff Carousel	East Providence, Rhode Island		Looff	c. 1895	
Flying Horse Carousel	Westerly, Rhode Island		Dare	c. 1876	
The Gesa Carousel of Dreams	Southridge Sports Complex, Kennewick, Washington		Fred Dolle Company/Carmel	1910	Formerly located in Silver Beach Amusement Park in St. Joseph, Michigan
Riverfront Park Carousel	Riverfront Park, Spokane, Washington		Looff	1909	
Roseneath Carousel	Roseneath Fairgrounds, Alnwick/Haldimand, Ontario		Parker/Herschell–Spillman	1906	

== Cultural references ==
"Grab the brass ring," "reach for the brass ring," and similar phrases are metaphors for seeking the highest prize (especially a championship ring in sports) or living life to the fullest. This is exemplified by the annual Brass Ring Awards presented by the International Association of Amusement Parks and Attractions (IAAPA) to recognize achievements in the worldwide amusement industry. It is not clear when the term brass ring used in this context came into wide use, but it has been found in dictionaries since the late 19th century. The term has also been used in multiple book titles.

Usage of the brass ring term and its symbolism can be found in numerous forms of media, including the last chapter of the 1951 book The Catcher in the Rye, when Phoebe, the sister of Holden Caulfield, reaches for a brass ring while riding a carousel. The brass ring is symbolic of adulthood, the transition to which is a preoccupation of Holden throughout the book. The term is also present in music, such as the Four Seasons' 1967 song "Beggin'." It contains the line "now that big brass ring is a shade of black," a reference to missing an important opportunity. The brass ring term also exists in film, specifically during the climax of the 1992 film Sneakers, in which all of the main characters have the opportunity to receive anything they want in exchange for handing over a crucial piece of technology to the US National Security Agency. When River Phoenix's character requests something with no monetary value, he is admonished by Robert Redford's character to think bigger, as "this is the brass ring." This term was also used in television-broadcast professional wrestling when Tyson Kidd and Cesaro of World Wrestling Entertainment (WWE) formed an official alliance in 2015, calling themselves the "Brass Ring Club."

== Bibliography ==
- Hinds, Anne Dion (1990). Grab the Brass Ring: the American Carousel (1st ed.). Crown Publishers, Inc. ISBN 0-517-57486-1.
