= Broad Ripple Park Carousel =

Antique carousel in Indianapolis, Indiana, US

- U.S. National Register of Historic Places
- U.S. National Historic Landmark
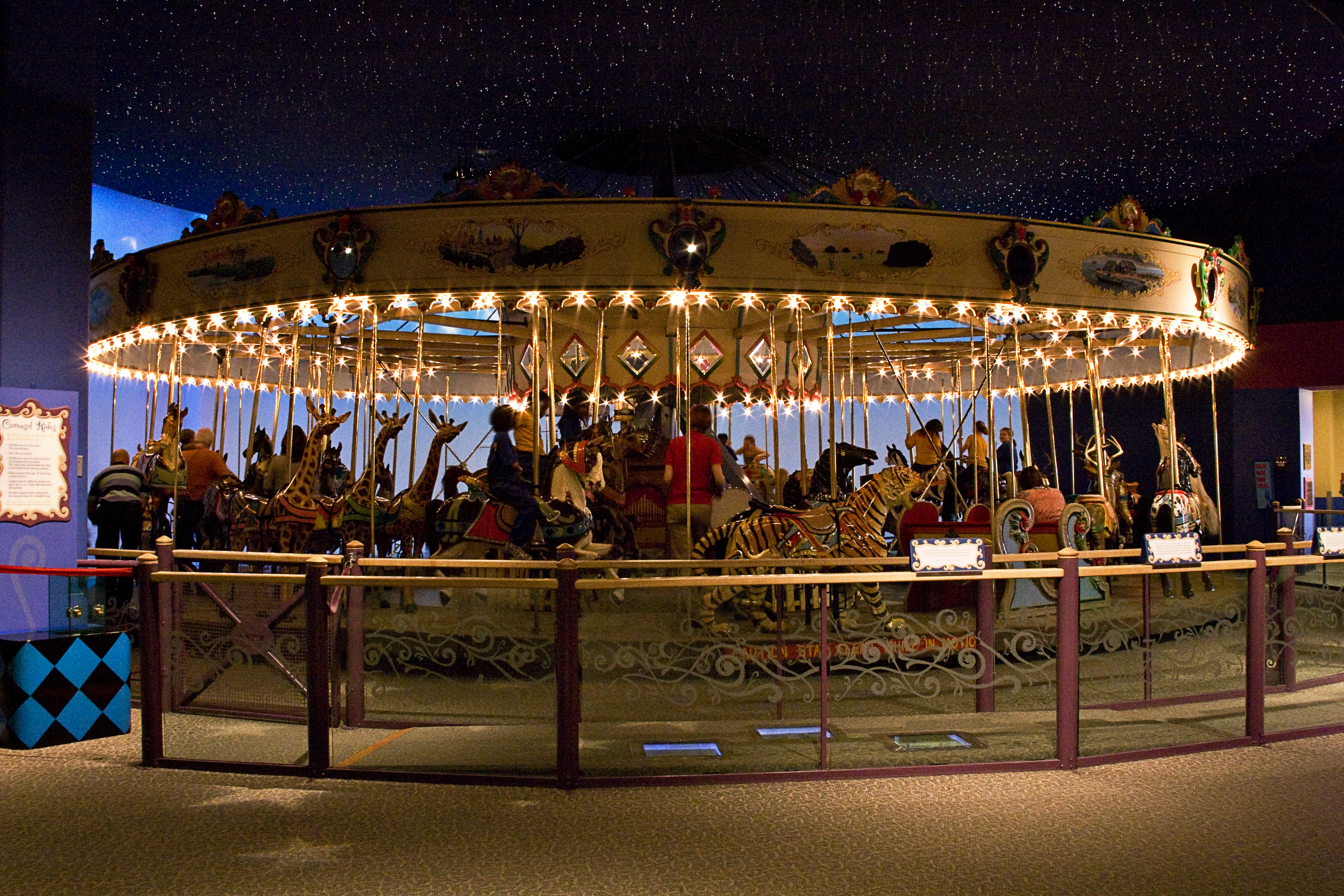
- The restored carousel in The Children's Museum of Indianapolis

- Location within Indianapolis Location within Indiana Location within the United States
- Location: 30th and Meridian Streets, Indianapolis, Indiana, United States
- Coordinates: 39°48′39″N 86°9′25.5″W
- Built: 1917
- Architect: William F. Mangels; Gustav Dentzel
- NRHP reference No.: 87000839

Significant dates
- Added to NRHP: February 27, 1987
- Designated NHL: February 27, 1987

Broad Ripple Park Carousel (Note: Also known as White City Carousel and Children's Museum Carousel.) is an antique carousel in The Children's Museum of Indianapolis. It was installed in 1917 at an amusement park near the White River in Indianapolis, Indiana, where it remained until the building housing it collapsed in 1956. The ride's mechanism was destroyed, but the animals were relatively unscathed and put into storage by the park's owners, the Indianapolis Department of Parks and Recreation. The animals were carved by the Dentzel Carousel Company sometime before 1900, but were assembled by the William F. Mangels carousel company, which also supplied the engine powering the ride.

The Children's Museum of Indianapolis acquired its first two carved animals from the ride in 1965 and the last few wooden animals in 1973. The museum planned to sell some to finance the restoration of others until the director of the museum, Mildred Compton, was convinced by carousel enthusiasts that the museum should instead restore all the animals and recreate the working carousel. Restoration of the carved animals began in 1966 and was only finished with the restoration of the entire carousel in 1977. No space had been allocated for the display of such a large exhibit in the museum's planned new building, which meant some re-designing was necessary to allow its installation on the fifth floor. A 1919 Wurlitzer band organ model No. 146, a type manufactured only for carousels, was also installed. As restored, the carousel is 42 feet (13 meters) wide and has a total of 42 animals, including – as well as the usual horses – goats, giraffes, deer, a lion, and a tiger. It was designated a National Historic Landmark in 1987.

== History ==
=== Background ===
The Broad Ripple Park Carousel was installed in 1917 in an amusement park on the outskirts of Indianapolis, Indiana. The White City Amusement Park had been established in 1906 in what is now Broad Ripple Village, alongside the White River. In 1908, a fire caused damage throughout the park, and only the swimming pool remained unscathed. The park closed for three years until its purchase by the Union Traction Company, which restored it and operated it for eleven years. The carousel was installed during the Union Traction Company's ownership. The park was sold in May 1922 to the new Broad Ripple Amusement Park Association and renamed Broad Ripple Park. In 1927, the park was sold again, and changed hands once more in 1938. The Board of Parks Commission of Indianapolis bought the property on May 18, 1945, paying $131,500 (approximately $2.35 million as of 2025) for the 60-acre (24-hectare) tract, and turned the property into a general-use park, destroying all rides it could not sell. The board's original plan was to sell the carousel and the narrow-gauge railway rides. Only the carousel remained in Indianapolis after it was unsold; the steam locomotive is now at the Indiana Transportation Museum at Noblesville, Indiana.

=== Installation ===
The carousel was commissioned by William Hubbs, who had it installed in White City Amusement Park in 1917. Built on a Mangel-Illions mechanism, it used animals carved by the Dentzel carousel company of Philadelphia, Pennsylvania, sometime before 1900. The carousel was assembled by the William F. Mangels carousel company in 1917. It was probably not the first carousel in the park, as there are indications of a previous ride that came from Hartford, Connecticut. (Note: If the previous carousel has been correctly identified, it then went to Virginia and then to Fort Wayne, Indiana after leaving Indianapolis.)

Nothing is known of the history of the animals before their installation in the 1917 carousel assembly. During the 1960s, newspaper reports stated that it was believed that the animals had arrived in Indianapolis in 1917, imported from Germany by two brothers named Mangels, but later research revealed the animals were manufactured by the Dentzel carousel company. Also included in the installation were oil paintings on the canopy over the animals and mechanism.

Part of the installation appears to have involved the retrofitting of some animals to fit the Mangels mechanism. During this process, some of the animals, which were carved in stationary or standing positions and thus not meant to be "jumpers" (animals that moved up and down), were modified to allow them to move.

=== Park usage ===
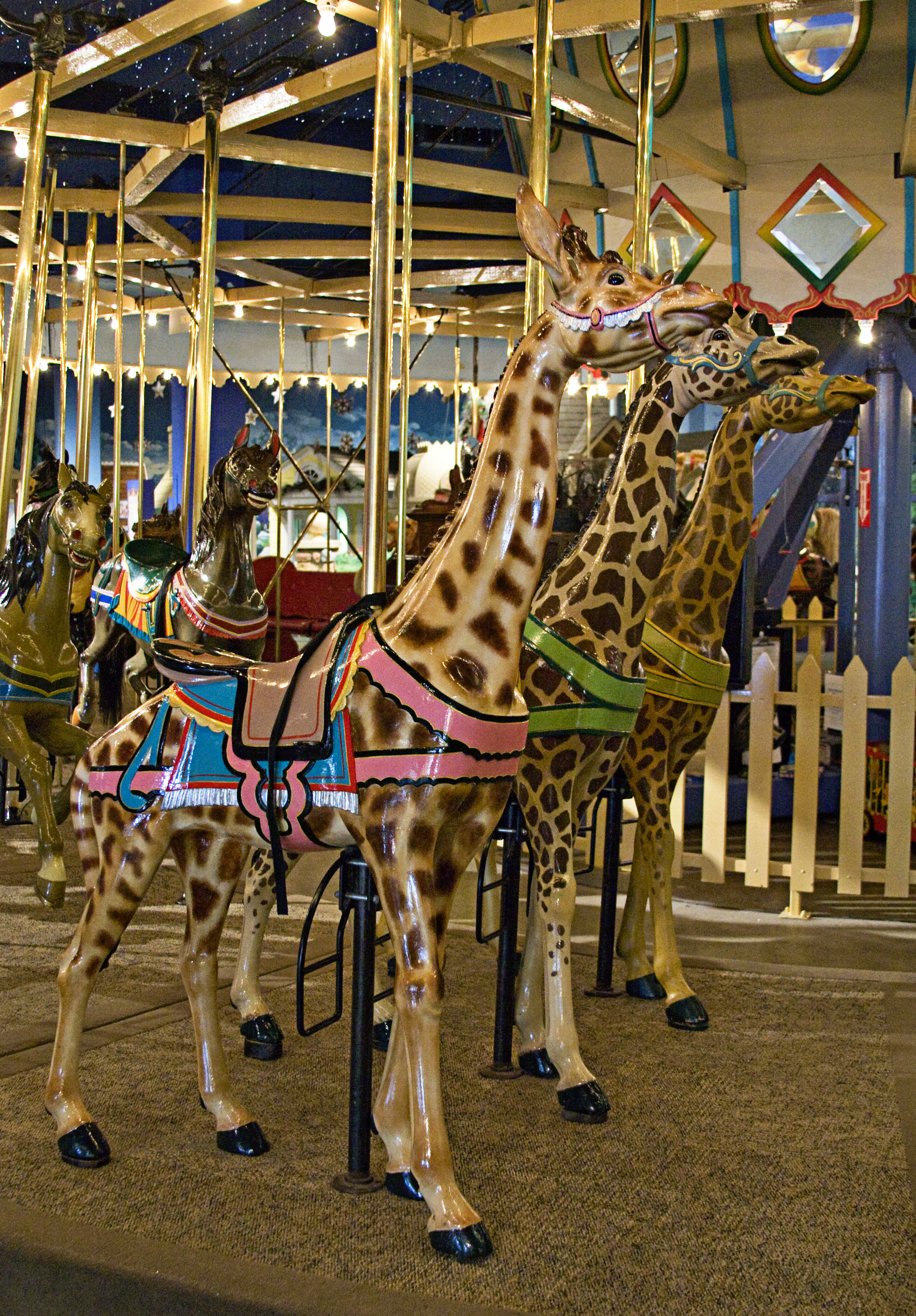
A row of giraffes was always part of one of Dentzel's carousels, as they were his favorite animal.

Between 1917 and 1938, the carousel was located near the White City park pool, in an enclosed building with numerous large windows. The carousel, as with the rest of the park, was allowed to be used only by White people. In 1938, after the park was purchased by William McCurry, the ride was enclosed within an unwalled pavilion with a domed roof and moved to the area of the park set aside as a children's playground. The carousel was operated as a concession, which one operator, William Hubbs, (Note: It is not clear if this is the same man as the former owner of the park or not.) held for almost 10 years.

The park district does not appear to have moved the carousel after taking over in 1945, as a 1955 newspaper article noted it was still in the same spot it had occupied for 38 years. The carousel was again operated as a concession within the park, this time by the wife of Everett DuBois, the park superintendent. Like Hubbs, Mrs. DuBois operated the carousel for almost 10 years. Although the district did not change the ride's location, it noted in 1955 that the equipment was showing its age. In 1955, the park district attempted to paint over the oil paintings on the canopy, which had deteriorated. The Indianapolis Art League objected, and volunteered to restore the original paintings rather than have them painted over with Disney characters.

The domed pavilion housing the mechanism collapsed in 1956, destroying the mechanism and the sweeps that supported the animals. The park district disposed of the destroyed mechanical parts and stored the animals. In 1961, the giraffes, along with other animals from the carousel, were used in a Christmas display at University Park in Indianapolis. During this time, discussions began between the park district and the Indianapolis Zoological Society about the possibility of the Zoological Society acquiring the animals for use in its children's zoo section. In April 1962 newspaper reports stated that the animals were to be donated to the zoo, for installation in the main zoo; the zoo planned to purchase a smaller merry-go-round for the children's zoo. The animals were apparently still being offered to the zoo in December 1963, as a newspaper story announced that the park district had just given the zoo authorization to use the carousel parts, and volunteers were being sought to restore the animals. The president of the Zoological Society described the animals as "bigger and more realistically colored, and more intricately detailed, sturdier, and they have more different kinds of animals than that aluminum junk they throw out today".

=== Acquisition by the museum ===
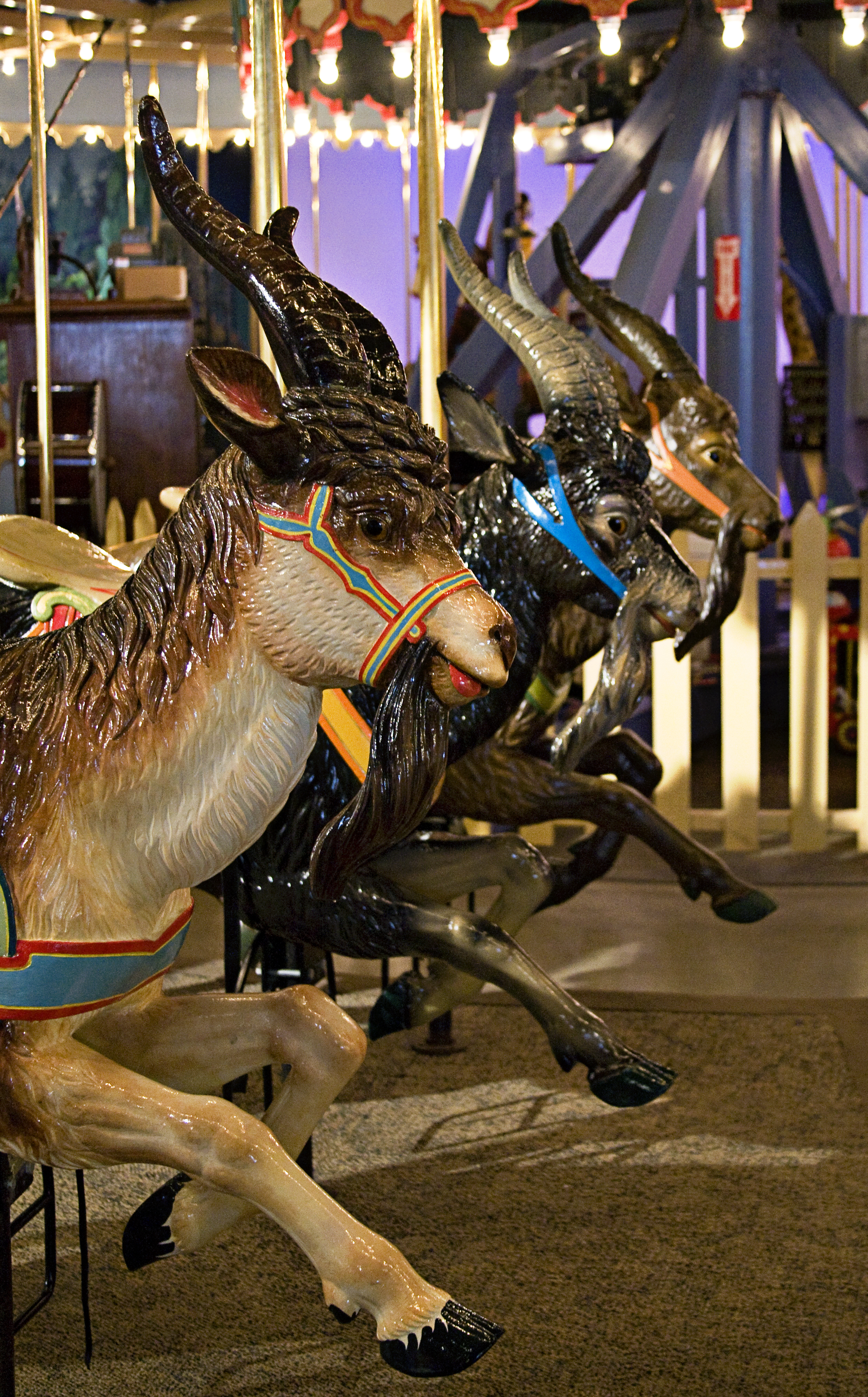
Closeup of the heads of the row of goats

In 1965 The Children's Museum of Indianapolis, then located in a building at 30th and Meridian Streets, acquired two horses from the carousel. Mildred Compton, the museum director, had seen the carousel in Broad Ripple Park before 1952, and hoped to secure the surviving animals, but the park district was initially unwilling to part with more than two, as the district was using five or six animals in the annual Christmas displays at Monument Circle. During the first half of 1966, the two horses were refinished by a museum volunteer. Both were stripped of old paint, one was repainted, and the other was refinished with lemon oil to feature the carvings on the animal. Compton obtained real horse tails from an Indianapolis slaughterhouse to replace the lost originals. By September 1966, the two horses were ready for display in the museum's front entrance.

The park district allowed the museum to use one of the surviving giraffes in a booth at a fall festival held at the Indianapolis Museum of Art in 1968. (Note: During the festival, the large number of children around the giraffe caused the animal to fall over, and its head broke off.) The museum subsequently acquired most of the remaining animals in 1969, after a search through the storage building containing the animals. The animals and parts of animals had to be searched for in corners and under boxes in the park district storage building. (Note: Originally, the animals were considered a loan from the park district, but after the new museum building was completed, the park district officially donated them.) Besides a large number of horses, 2 more giraffes, a lion, and a tiger were found. Photographs of the animals were sent to Frederic Fried, an expert in carousels, who confirmed that the animals were made in the United States, not Germany, probably before 1900. He also confirmed that they were carved by the Dentzel company.

The museum intended to keep a few of the animals and sell the others to finance its operations, but Mildred Compton returned from a visit to the 1973 National Carousel Roundtable convinced that it should instead restore all of them and recreate the working carousel in its planned new building. But no space had been allocated to allow the display of such a large exhibit, requiring the plans to be adjusted. Columns required in the original layout were removed to allow the carousel's installation on the fifth floor.

While plans were underway to secure funding for the restoration of the carousel, efforts were made to find some missing animals. By studying old photographs of the carousel, it was determined there had been three deer or stags that had not been found in the park district storage building. No one at the park district knew of their whereabouts, and some employees believed the animals had disintegrated. As well as the missing deer, two horses were missing. The museum contacted local newspapers, which published stories on the efforts to restore the carousel. The reports mentioned the missing animals and that the museum was trying to locate them. An anonymous tip received in December 1973 revealed the deer were used in the annual Christmas Gift and Hobby Show, where they served as escorts for Santa Claus. Compton was able to secure the animals from the park district for the museum.

=== Restoration ===
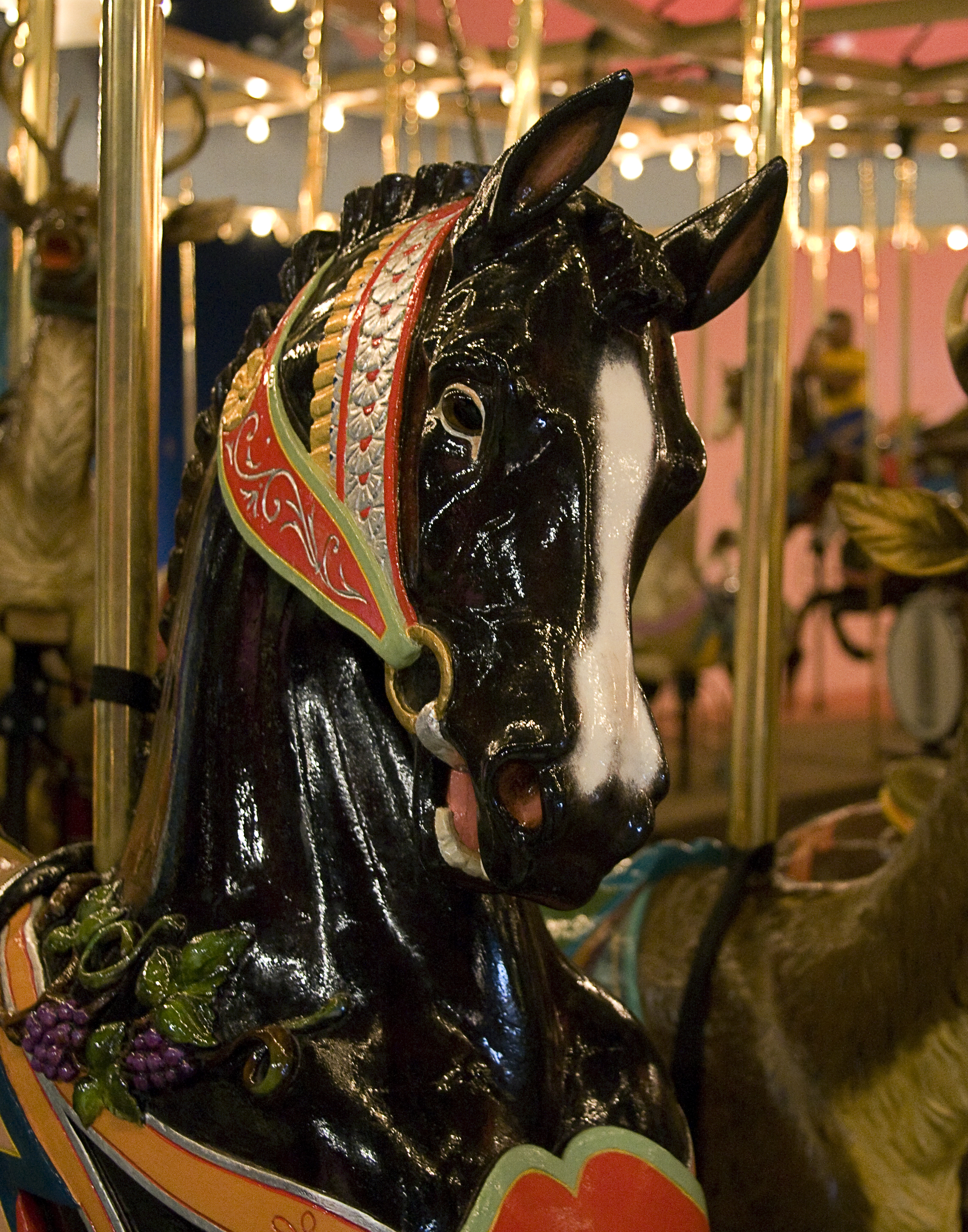
The head of one of the carousel's horses

The mechanical parts were assembled in the fifth-floor area in November 1975, using a non-original Mangel-Illions mechanism. A Wurlitzer carousel organ, which had belonged to an amusement park in San Francisco, was added. Before it was installed in the Children's Museum, the organ was refurbished and rebuilt by Carval Stoots of Plainfield, Indiana, in 1976.

An artist from Pennsylvania recreated the upper outside panels in the style of the carousels of the period around the time of World War I. The carvings on the panels were provided by Allen and Rita Orre of Ohio and the International Amusement Devices Company of Ohio; the mirrors were produced by an Indianapolis glass firm. The scenery panels were initially some discovered Dentzel company panels, and these were used in 1976 and 1977 while replica Mangels-Illions-style panels were built in the museum's shops.

The animals were restored between 1975 and 1977 by Bill and Caroline Von Stein of Cincinnati, Ohio. The Von Steins were experienced with other types of museum conservation work, but had never restored carousel animals. Because of the animals' poor condition, no attempt was made to restore them to their original paintwork; instead, the restorers were allowed to use their judgment on color choices and other decorations. The museum's only requirements were that they use reasonably natural decorative schemes and no high-gloss paint.

=== Changes since initial restoration ===
The original engine propelling the carousel was a belt-driven mechanism, but after the initial restoration it was exchanged for a fluid drive provided by the Kissell Brothers Amusement Rides company of Cincinnati, Ohio, (Note: The source used for this information spells the company name "Kissell", but the company itself uses "Kissel".) who suggested the platform for the carousel be improved. To provide crowd control, a pavilion was built over the carousel, and a ticket booth was installed. Neither was based on any extant buildings, but each was a composite of several other structures. The animals are removed one at a time from the carousel for routine maintenance and refurbishment, which is carried out in the museum's own shops.

The carousel was designated a National Historic Landmark on February 27, 1987, and the National Historic Landmarks Program assessed its condition as "satisfactory" in 2008. The carousel is one of the largest displayed artifacts in the museum, and is available to be ridden by visitors.

=== QRpedia ===
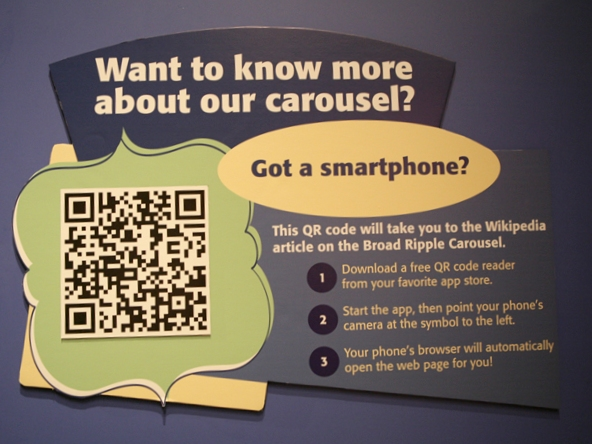
Label using a QRpedia code to direct visitors to the Wikipedia article on the carousel.

The carousel features a QR code as part of the museum's involvement in the QRpedia project. Visitors may scan the code with a suitable mobile device and will be served the Wikipedia article about it, in whatever language their device is set to use, if available.

== Carousel composition ==
The carousel is one of the three oldest surviving Dentzel menagerie carousels. (Note: The other two are the Spencer Park Dentzel Carousel in Logansport, Indiana and the Highland Park Dentzel Carousel in Meridian, Mississippi.) Thirty-one of its 42 wood-carved animals are horses, 14 standing and 17 jumping. There are also three goats, three giraffes, three deer, one lion, and one tiger. The single lion and tiger are typical of Dentzel-created carousels, as are the three giraffes; Gustav Dentzel's love of that animal resulted in all of his carousels including at least one row of giraffes. The animals are arranged in three circles around the central mechanism, alternating leaping or jumping horses with stationary animals. Typical for a Mangels-Illions manufactured carousel, there are 18 jumping animals, all but one of which is original; the horse that could not be found in 1975 was replaced with another Dentzel horse. Although the animals were not originally carved to display jewels, at some point they were so displayed at the amusement park, and thus the museum restored the animals on the outside circle with jewels.

The mechanism powering the ride is a 40-foot (12-meter) diameter Mangels-Illions manufactured carousel, but it is uncertain whether this exactly matches the original Mangels-Illions mechanism. The whole assembly has a diameter of 42 feet (13 meters). The organ, a 1919 Wurlitzer carousel organ model No. 146, is of a type designed specifically for carousels.

== See also ==
- Amusement rides on the National Register of Historic Places
- List of attractions and events in Indianapolis
- List of National Historic Landmarks in Indiana
- National Register of Historic Places listings in Center Township, Marion County, Indiana
