= Nunley's Happyland =

New York amusement park

Nunley's Happyland was the original name of an amusement park in the hamlet of Bethpage on Long Island, New York, located at the intersection of Hempstead Turnpike (Route 24) and Hicksville Road (Route 107). It operated from 1951 through the 1970s. After a change in ownership in its later years of operation, the park's name was changed to "Smiley's Happyland,"

Happyland was established by William Nunley, a third-generation amusement park entrepreneur, who already operated facilities in Baldwin, in Queens (in Broad Channel and Rockaway Beach), and in Westchester County (in Yonkers), N.Y. The new park would be larger than Nunley's other locations and, unlike its predecessors, was designed from the start for year-round operation, with a heated indoor ride area. Two walls of the pavilion were designed with large movable glass panels which could be opened in warm weather or closed when it was cold. (The glass doors used were salvaged from the French pavilion at the 1939-40 World's Fair.)

When Nunley announced plans for the new park, some colleagues in the amusement business questioned the wisdom of building an expensive facility at a site that seemed too far from population centers to be successful, calling the location "virtually deserted". However, the postwar suburban construction boom soon proved such doubts unfounded, as the area around Happyland was rapidly developed for housing. The park proved popular with young families who moved into surrounding communities such as Bethpage, Levittown, Massapequa, and Farmingdale, and attendance in the first years of operation surpassed expectations. In a further departure from tradition, Happyland was not located near a railroad or trolley line but was set up to cater to the motoring public, with a parking lot that initially held 400 cars.

William Nunley never got the chance to see Happyland in operation: he died in April 1951, six months before the park opened on October 12, 1951. His wife Miriam took over management of Happyland and the other family properties and remained involved in their operation, with partner Norman Russell, for years to come.

Adjacent to the main Happyland building and connected to it by a glass-walled passageway was a fast food-style restaurant called the Jolly Roger (alternatively "Jolly Roger's"). This was built by Max Lander and owned by two partners (Robert Rubin and Bill Feldstein). Over time, confusion arose between the park and restaurant names, and it was (and remains) common to hear the entire facility referred to by Long Islanders as "the Jolly Roger's amusement park".

The Smiley's Happyland Park was owned by Mildred Tarnow (later by her husband John Tarnow after she died) and the Giddens family. John Tarnow ran the park as well as kept the carousel and other rides in good mechanical shape. The Jolly Roger restaurant changed its name to "Robin Hood" in 1974. While the name of the restaurant changed, everything else in the restaurant was the same. The restaurant (as Robin Hood) closed in 1976, and the park followed in 1978. (Some sources say 1977.)

The site is now occupied by a strip mall.

== Attractions ==
When Happyland opened in 1951, it had a mix of outdoor and indoor rides. Outdoors were a Schiff Ferris wheel, Schiff roller coaster, Hodges hand cars, and a ridable miniature railway. Inside were a Herschel "Sky Fighter," Pinto fire engine, Schiff boat ride, Pinto pony ride, and a 48-horse carousel. (This carousel should not be confused with the one from Nunley's Baldwin facility, which is preserved at Nassau County's "Museum Row.") Along the walls were more than one hundred items of arcade equipment: small coin-operated rides, pinball machines, skee-ball games, and hand-cranked mutoscope-style movie viewers.

Of particular note was an antique German mechanical organ with elaborately carved animated musician figures who moved in time with the music. According to Mechanical Music Digest Archives, the organ was built by A. Ruth & Sohn of Waldkirch, Germany in 1910, and was the only one of its kind. It was installed in Nunley's Rockaway facility for many years before he moved it to the Bethpage site. The organ was rebuilt in 1948 and the 78-key book music system was replaced with a Wurlitzer-style 165 double-roll system. After Happyland closed, a collector named Gavin McDonough acquired the organ and restored it after several years' work.

Additional rides and attractions were added as the years passed, most notably a Wild Mouse-type roller coaster and a bumper car pavilion.

A miniature golf course and batting cages were located directly across Hicksville Road from the main Happyland site. These remain in operation as of 2019, but it is unknown if they ever had any actual corporate connection to the park.
