= Flying Horse Carousel =

Carousel in Westerly, Rhode Island

- U.S. National Register of Historic Places
- U.S. National Historic Landmark
- U.S. Historic district – Contributing property
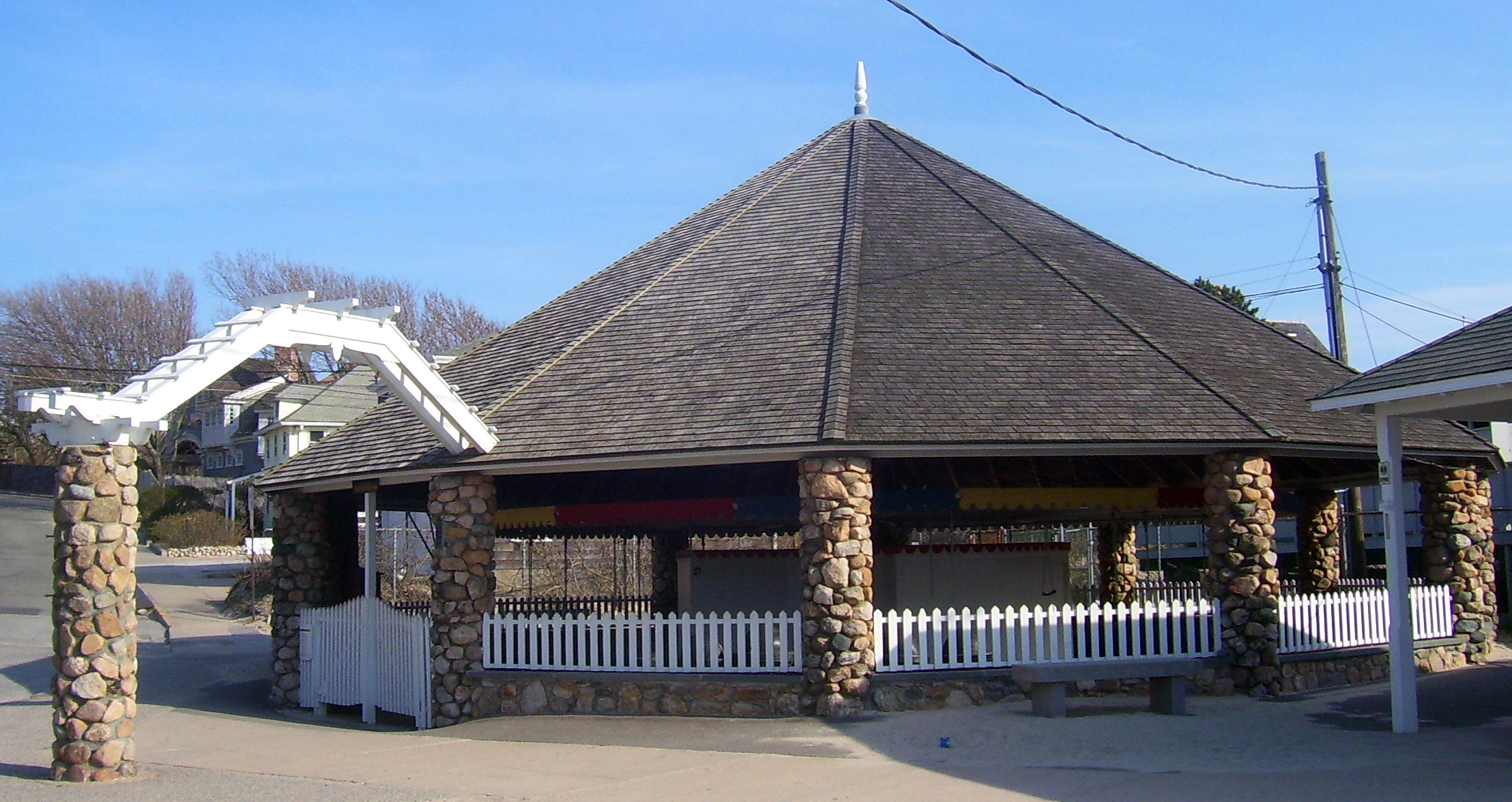
- Carousel shelter building in 2008, during off-season, with horses in storage

- Location within Rhode Island Location within the United States
- Interactive map showing the location of Flying Horse Carousel
- Location: Watch Hill, RI
- Coordinates: 41°18′32″N 71°51′31″W
- Built: 1876; 150 years ago
- Architect: Charles W.F. Dare Co.
- Part of: Watch Hill Historic District (ID85001948)
- NRHP reference No.: 80000019

Significant dates
- Added to NRHP: January 11, 1980
- Designated NHL: February 27, 1987
- Designated CP: September 5, 1985

The Flying Horse Carousel is a historic carousel in Watch Hill, the principal summer resort area of the town of Westerly, Rhode Island, United States. It is one of two in the state designated as National Historic Landmarks, along with the Crescent Park Looff Carousel in East Providence. It is the oldest operating carousel in the United States in which the horses are suspended from chains.

== Description ==
The carousel is believed to have been built around 1876 by the Charles W. F. Dare Company of New York. This is about the same time attributed to the construction of the Flying Horses Carousel in Oak Bluffs, Massachusetts, although both dates are based on inferences and lack certainty. It consists of twenty horses in two sizes which are suspended by chains from sweeps radiating out from the center of the carousel under its canopy. The bodies of the horses are believed to have been carved from single blocks of wood, with the legs carved separately and attached. The horses still have their original agate eyes; other trappings have been replaced, including manes and reins. The chains holding the horses are attached to the rump and to an iron bar added to the pommel, apparently a modification. When the carousel rotates, centrifugal force drives the horses outward, giving rise to the name "flying horses." The horses in the Oak Bluffs carousel are fixed to columns between spreader panels above and a platform below.

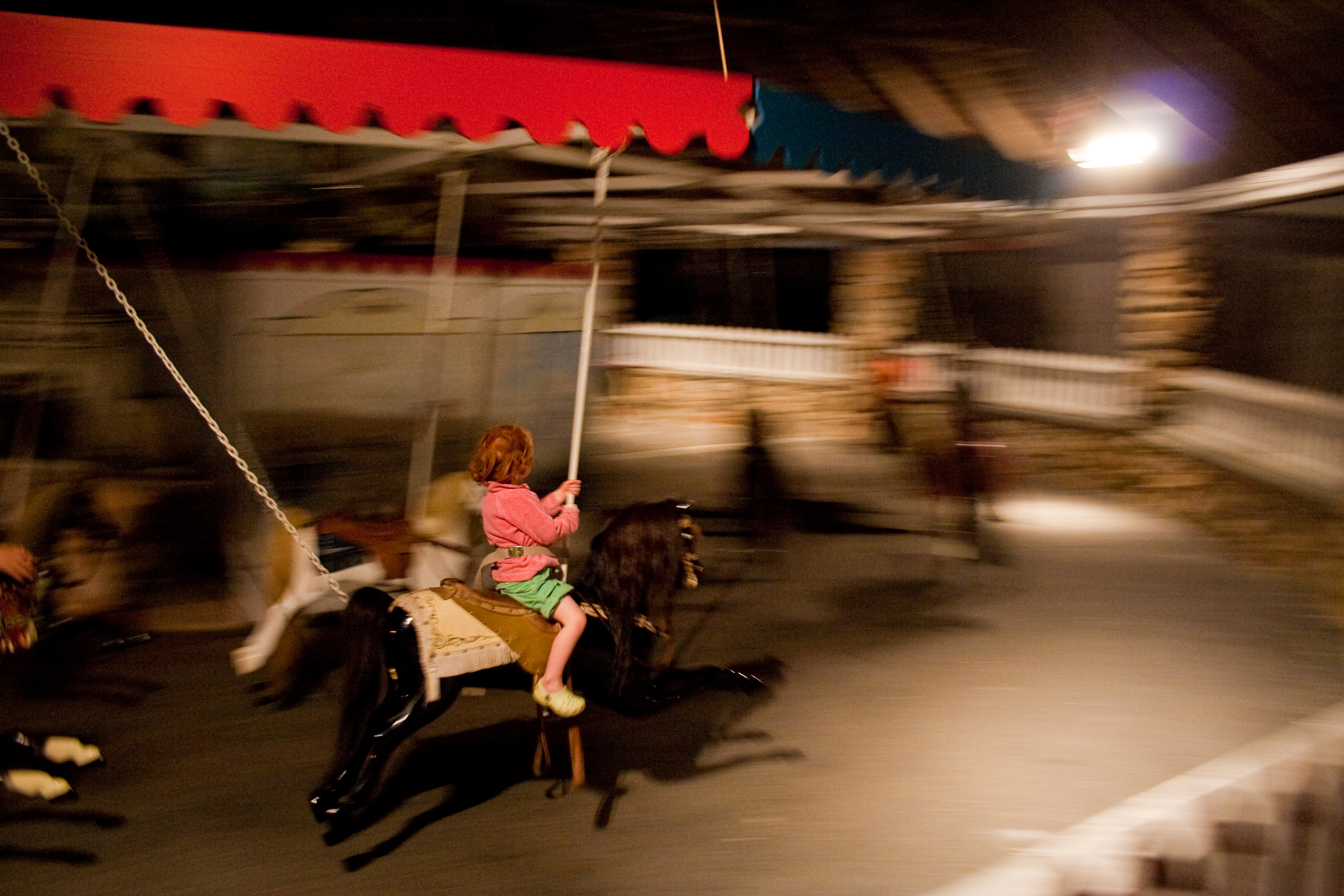
A child rides the carousel

The carousel is located in a wood-frame pavilion at the end of Bay Street in Watch Hill. It is a ten-sided structure with a hipped roof, and appears to date to the early 20th century. A low picket fence surrounds the structure to prevent access to the space in which the horses fly when the carousel is in operation. The floor of the pavilion is now concrete; it was originally sand.

Children younger than 12 years old may ride. In the middle of the ride, a device holding metal rings is lowered for riders to grab as they pass. The last ring is brass, granting the rider a free ride token. The cost for riders on the outer horses is $4.00, whereas a ride on the inner is $1.00.

== History ==
The carousel was originally part of a traveling carnival until 1879, when the carnival was forced to abandon it in Watch Hill. It was powered by a horse at that time, with music provided by a hand-cranked organ. Power was provided by water in 1897, and the carousel was electrified about 1914. It was extensively damaged by the New England Hurricane of 1938 which devastated Watch Hill. However, its horses were recovered from the sand dunes and the carousel was restored to operation; three chariots were lost which were not replaced. The carousel and its buildings have been the subject of repairs and restorations in the following decades. It is maintained by the non-profit Watch Hill Improvement Society.

The carousel was listed on the National Register of Historic Places in 1980 and declared a National Historic Landmark in 1987. It operates annually from June to Labor Day.

== See also ==
- Amusement rides on the National Register of Historic Places
- List of National Historic Landmarks in Rhode Island
- National Register of Historic Places listings in Washington County, Rhode Island
