= Crescent Park Looff Carousel =

Carousel in East Providence, Rhode Island

- U.S. National Register of Historic Places
- U.S. National Historic Landmark
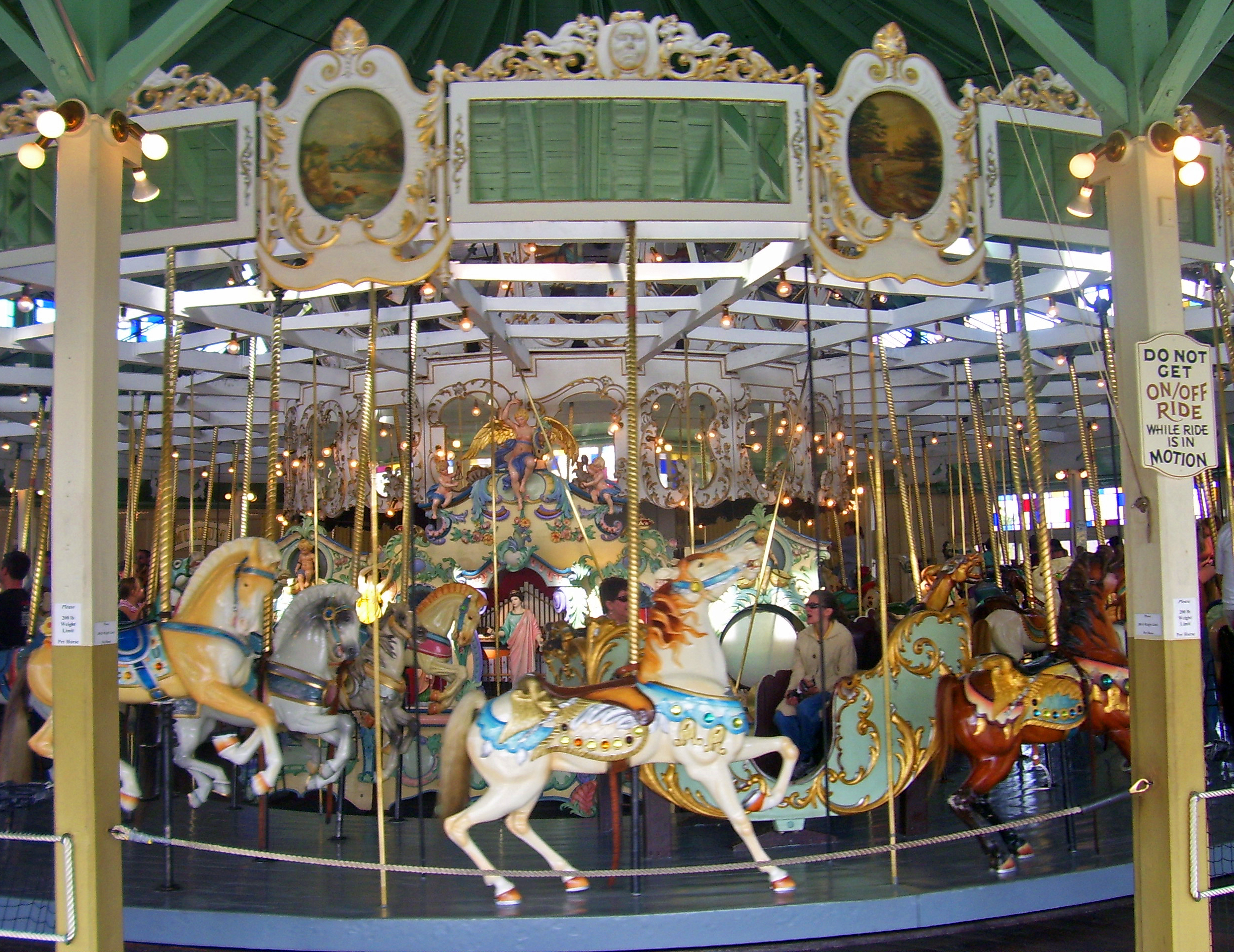
- Riders on carousel, 2008

- Location within Rhode Island Location within the United States
- Location: Bullock's Point Avenue, East Providence, Rhode Island
- Coordinates: 41°45′23″N 71°21′33″W
- Built: 1895; 131 years ago
- Architect: Charles I.D. Looff
- MPS: East Providence MRA (AD) (2.6MB)
- NRHP reference No.: 76000045

Significant dates
- Added to NRHP: April 21, 1976
- Designated NHL: February 27, 1987

Crescent Park Looff Carousel, also known as Crescent Park Carousel or more officially as Crescent Park Looff Carousel and Shelter Building, is a National Historic Landmark in East Providence, Rhode Island.

The hand-carved carousel was built in 1895 by Charles I. D. Looff at his Brooklyn, New York factory and installed at Crescent Park Amusement Park in the Riverside section of East Providence, Rhode Island. The ride's fifty-foot platform contains sixty-one horses, one camel, two single coaches, and two double chariots. Fifty-six of the horses are jumpers. It is among the finest and least-altered of Looff's surviving carousels, serving as a showcase for his workmanship.

== History ==
Charles I. D. Looff was born in Denmark in 1852 and immigrated to the United States in 1870. He built the first carousel at Coney Island in 1876. From his Brooklyn factory, Looff built many carousels for the East coast and places like the Texas State Fair in Dallas, the Oklahoma State Fair in Oklahoma City, as well as Houston and Fort Worth. In 1905, Looff moved his factory to Crescent Park and used this carousel as a showpiece for customers to select the horses that they wanted on their rides. Most of the figures on this carousel were carved between 1905 and 1910 when Looff moved his factory to Long Beach, California. Of almost fifty carousels that Looff built between 1875 and 1918, this is one of the ten or twelve remaining in operation.

When Crescent Park closed in 1977, the City of East Providence kept the carousel off of the auction block after being pressured by local coalitions in a lengthy legal battle. The restored ride continues to operate every summer and is controlled by a commission of eighteen people who maintain statutory authority over a managerial and operational staff.

The carousel was listed on the National Register of Historic Places in 1976, and was declared a National Historic Landmark in 1987. The Rhode Island General Assembly proclaimed the carousel as "the State Jewel of American Folk Art."

The carousel was re-opened on August 6, 2022 after a three year closure due to repair work.

== Building ==
The carousel is housed in one of Looff's classic "hippodrome" buildings topped with his traditional onion dome. Sunlight floods through multicolored clerestory windows and reflects off of faceted mirrors to create a magical kaleidoscope effect. The carousel is circled by several rows of wooden benches and a rope fence. Tickets are purchased from a free-standing booth located just inside the entrance and opposite from a small gift and snack stand. Adjacent to this stand is a small exhibit of historical artifacts. Vents at the roof's peak provide natural air circulation. A full-sized hand-carved American bald eagle sits atop the rides center pole. Managerial offices are located in a pavilion annex opposite the main access road which was formerly Looff's on-site workshop.

== Rides ==
Rides begin and end when a brass fog bell manufactured by PERKO Inc. is rung. The duration of the ride is determined with the help of a small hourglass affixed to the snare drum cabinet of the band organ. It is one of the only carousels in America where riders can play the ring game by grabbing a brass ring to earn a free ride. After catching the rings, riders throw them into the cut-out mouth of a clown face painted on a large canvas. Originally, the ride was powered by steam from the park's steam plant. The carousel is currently operated by an electric motor.

== Band organ ==
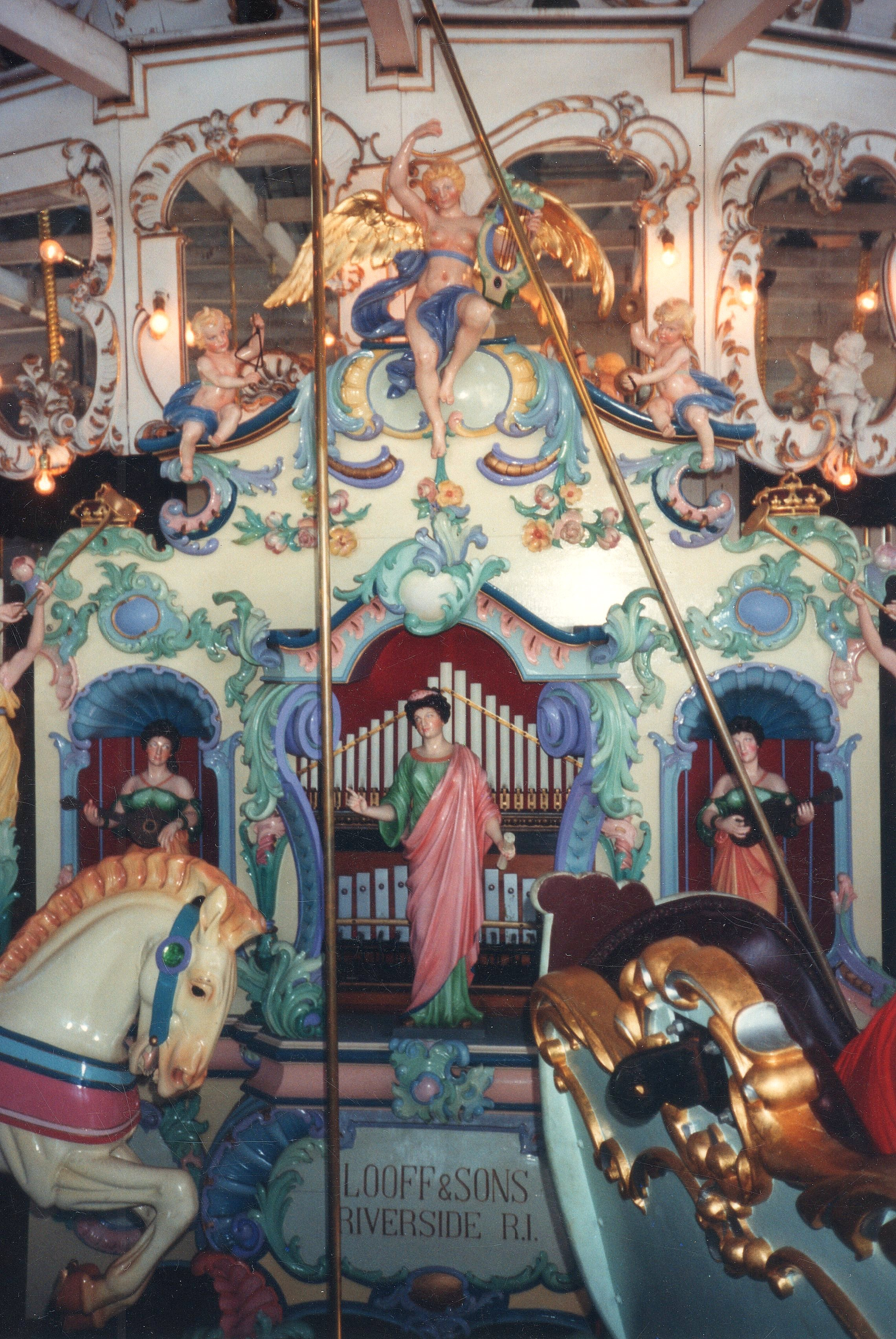
The band organ of the Looff Carousel

An Andreas Ruth und Sohn Style 38(or 38er Ruth) band organ, imported from Waldkirch, Germany, provides music from a Wurlitzer 165 music roll system, which replaced the original Ruth 96-keyless cardboard book music system. At least six cassette volumes of recorded music were previously sold at the carousel and have become rare collector's items. In response to noise complaints by the carousel operators and visitors, several of the ranks of pipes in the band organ have been disabled to reduce the music volume. In a notable 1995 incident, carved instruments from the facade of the band organ were stolen.

== See also ==
- Amusement rides on the National Register of Historic Places
- Flying Horse Carousel, a National Historic Landmark carousel in Watch Hill, Rhode Island
- List of National Historic Landmarks in Rhode Island
- National Register of Historic Places listings in Providence County, Rhode Island

== Images ==
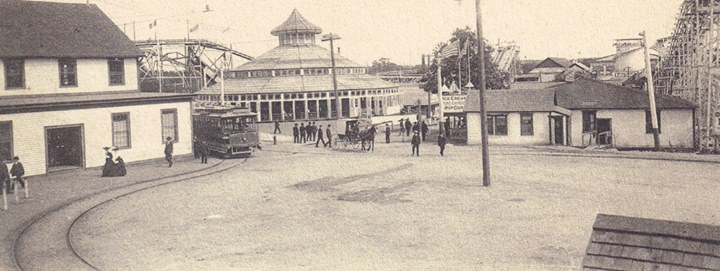
Crescent Park Looff Carousel and midway c.1905

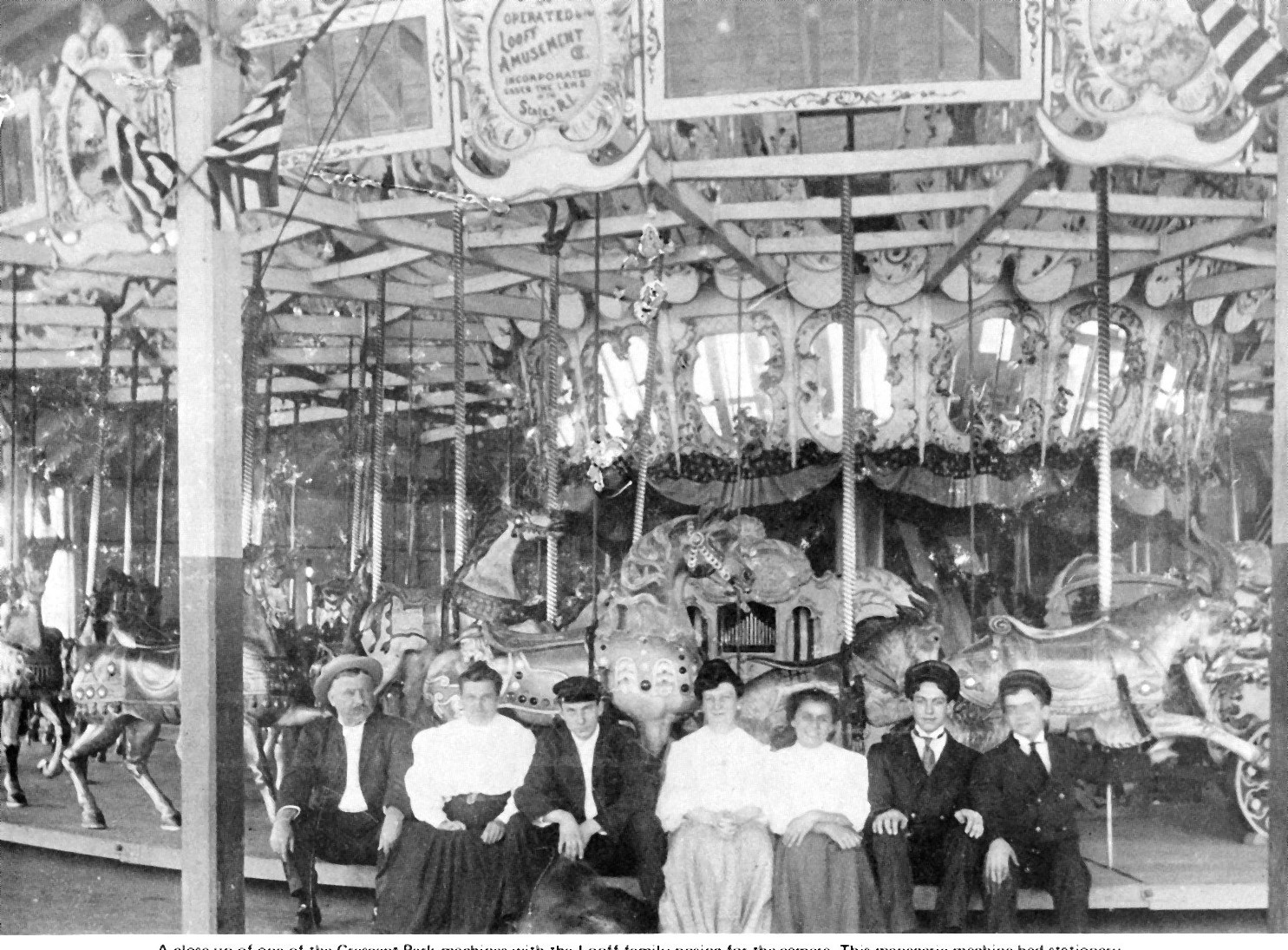
Looff family at Crescent Park mgr c.1905-1910

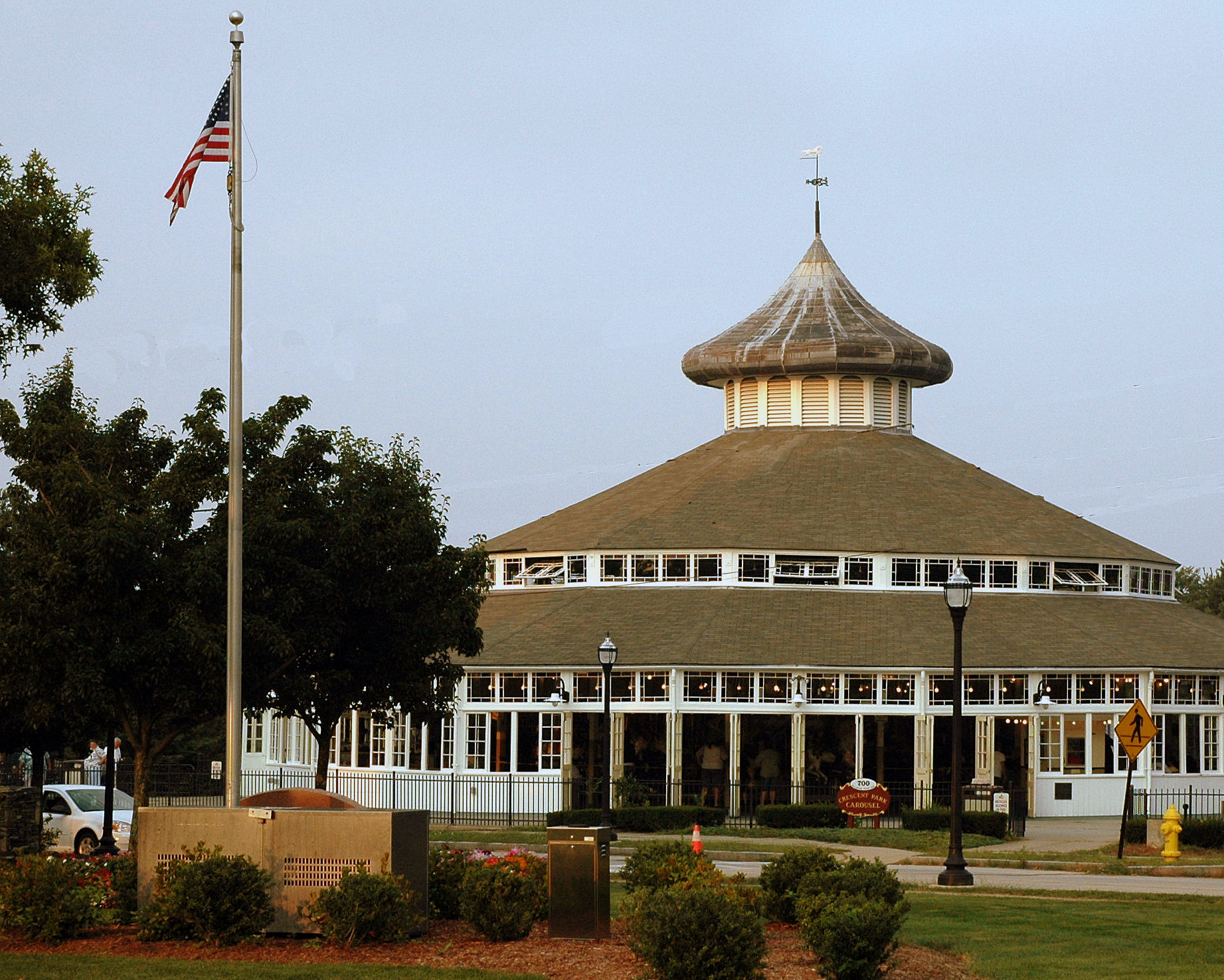
Crescent Park carousel in 2007
