= Tyson Kidd and Cesaro =

Professional wrestling tag team

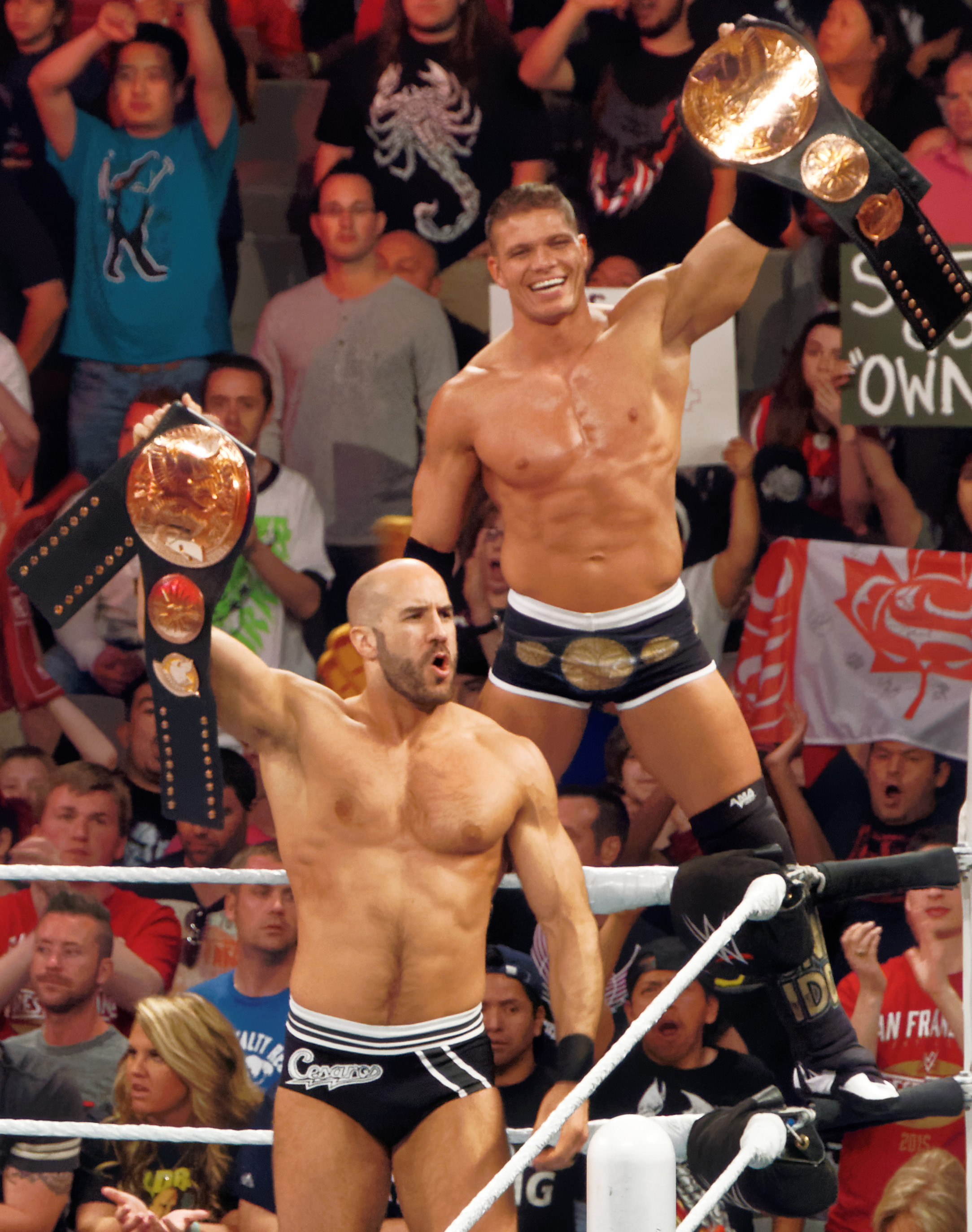
- Tyson Kidd and Cesaro as the WWE Tag Team Champions in March 2015

Tag team
- Members: Tyson Kidd; Cesaro; Natalya (valet)
- Name: Tyson Kidd and Cesaro
- Billed heights: Tyson Kidd; 5 ft 9 in (1.75 m); Cesaro; 6 ft 5 in (1.96 m); Natalya; 5 ft 5 in (1.65 m)
- Combined billed weight: 571 lb (259 kg)
- Debut: December 1, 2014
- Disbanded: June 7, 2015
- Years active: 2014–2015

Tyson Kidd and Cesaro were a professional wrestling tag team in WWE. They are former WWE Tag Team Champions. They formed a tag team in December 2014, and were accompanied to the ring by Natalya, Kidd's real-life wife. While the team had no official name, they were unofficially called the "Masters of the WWE Universe", a reference to the Masters of the Universe franchise, and the "Brass Ring Club", a reference to the New Japan Pro-Wrestling stable Bullet Club as well as a criticism of Cesaro from WWE chairman Vince McMahon. Other nicknames included BTE (Best Team Ever) and #FACT.

== History ==
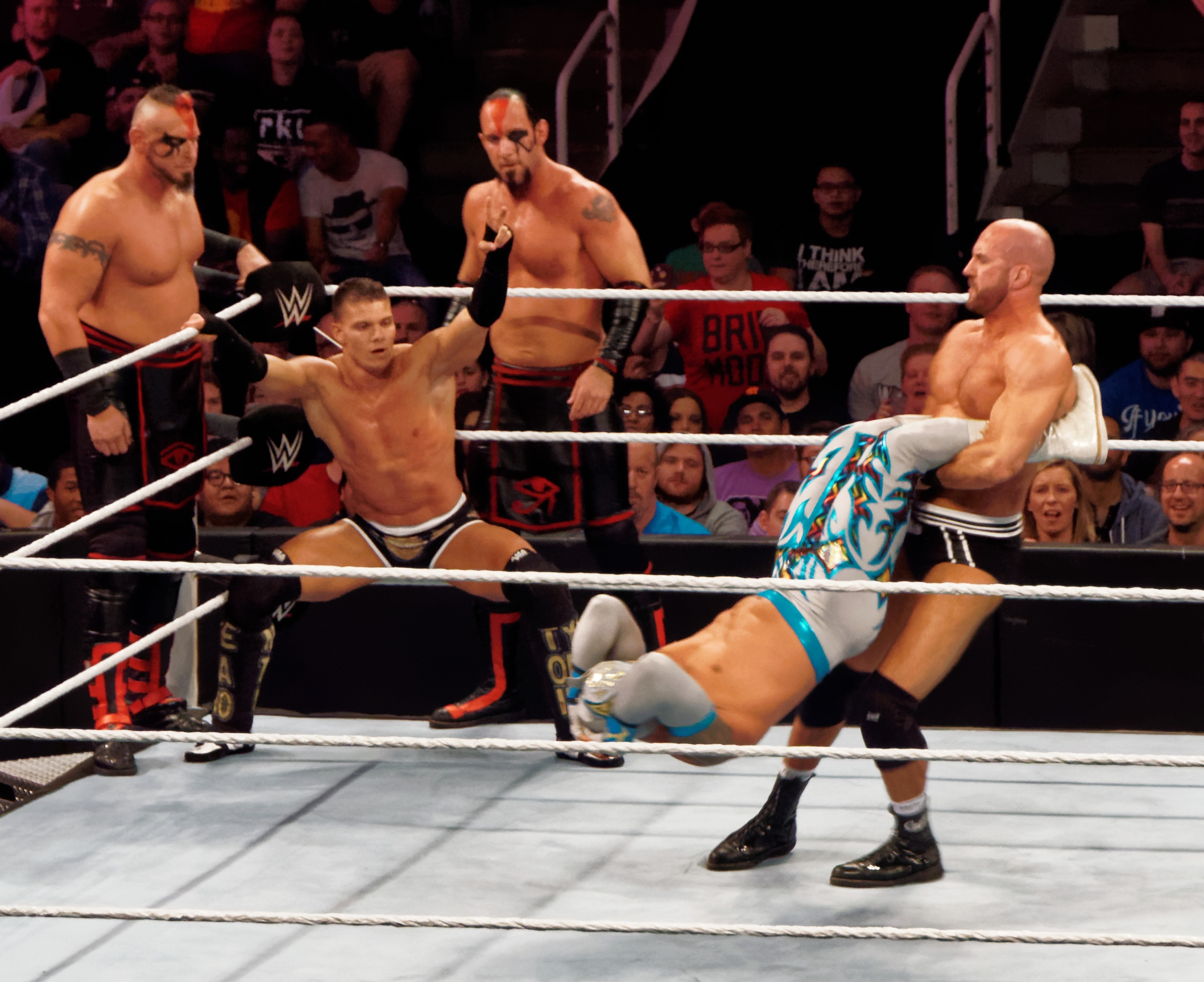
Kidd and Cesaro performing the Cesaro Swing/Dropkick combination.

Cesaro and Tyson Kidd first teamed on the December 1, 2014, episode of Raw during a tag team gauntlet match, where they were eliminated by The Usos. In January 2015, the pairing became an official alliance, informally adopting the name “The Brass Ring Club.” The duo earned several victories over Los Matadores and aligned with Adam Rose in a short-lived storyline feud with The New Day. At the Royal Rumble, Kidd and Cesaro defeated New Day members Big E and Kofi Kingston on the kickoff show.

At Fastlane on February 22, 2015, Kidd and Cesaro defeated The Usos to win the WWE Tag Team Championship. They retained the championship in a rematch the following night on Raw after Natalya, serving as their ringside ally, caused a disqualification. The pair successfully defended the titles at WrestleMania 31 in a fatal four-way tag team match involving The Usos, Los Matadores, and The New Day.

Kidd and Cesaro lost the titles to The New Day at Extreme Rules on April 26. At Payback, they had an unsuccessful two-out-three falls title rematch. The duo also competed in a tag team Elimination Chamber match for the titles at Elimination Chamber on May 31, where they were eliminated fourth.

On June 7, WWE announced that Kidd had suffered a serious neck and spinal injury during a dark match with Samoa Joe. The injury sidelined him indefinitely, and Kidd later confirmed his retirement on June 29, 2017, effectively putting an end to the team. He subsequently transitioned into a backstage producer role with WWE.

== Championships and accomplishments ==
- WWE
  - WWE Tag Team Championship (1 time)
