= Flying Horses Carousel =

Carousel in Oak Bluffs, Massachusetts

- Flying Horses
- U.S. National Register of Historic Places
- U.S. National Historic Landmark
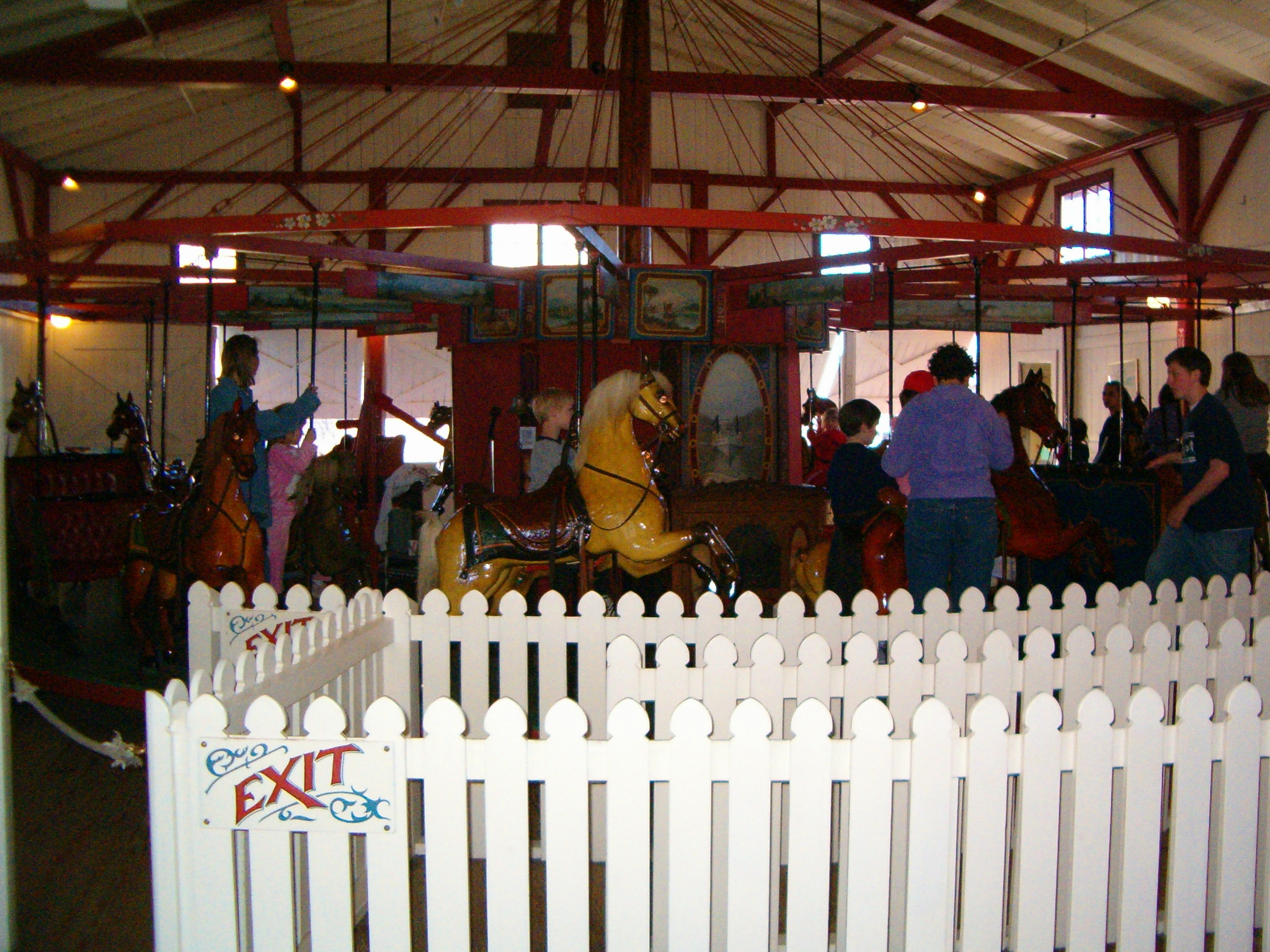
- The Flying Horses Carousel is the oldest operating platform carousel in America.

- Location within Massachusetts Location within the United States
- Interactive map showing the location of Flying Horses Carousel
- Location: Oak Bluffs, Massachusetts
- Coordinates: 41°27′26″N 70°33′28″W
- Built: 1876
- Architect: Charles W. F. Dare Co.
- NRHP reference No.: 79000342

Significant dates
- Added to NRHP: August 27, 1979
- Designated NHL: February 27, 1987

The Flying Horses Carousel is the oldest operating platform carousel in the United States. Located in the historic resort community of Oak Bluffs, Massachusetts, on Martha's Vineyard, the carousel was apparently first located in New York City before being moved to the island in the 1880s.

The carousel was listed on the National Register of Historic Places in 1979 and designated a National Historic Landmark in 1987. The carousel is one of only a handful of carousels that still have brass rings for a rider to attempt to grab as the carousel rotates.

== History ==
Oak Bluffs, located on the northeastern part of the island of Martha's Vineyard, was originally settled as part of Edgartown in the 17th century. In 1835 the Methodist camp known as Wesleyan Grove (also a National Historic Landmark) was established in the area. Development of the area as a summer resort became more formally organized with the establishment of the Oak Bluffs Land and Wharf Company in 1866. The company developed what was then one of the earliest plants artwork closely resembles that found in an 1870s catalog published by the Charles W. F. Dare Company, a major manufacturer of carousels in the late 19th century. At least one expert believes that artwork of the carousel itself was done by the same artist whose work appears in the catalog, suggesting its construction date to be between 1876 and 1878.

In 1884, F. O. Gordon of New York City acquired the carousel and moved it to Cottage City, as Oak Bluffs was then known. Evidence of its use in New York is surmised from a stamp "Coney Island #4" on the inside of one of its decorative panels. It was originally sited near the entrance to Oak Bluffs Harbor. In 1889, the town of Oak Bluffs acquired the carousel and moved it to its present location at the base of Circuit Avenue, the town's business and entertainment district. The town sold the carousel to Joseph Turnell in 1896, and it then went through a succession of owners before its acquisition by the Martha's Vineyard Land Trust in 1986.

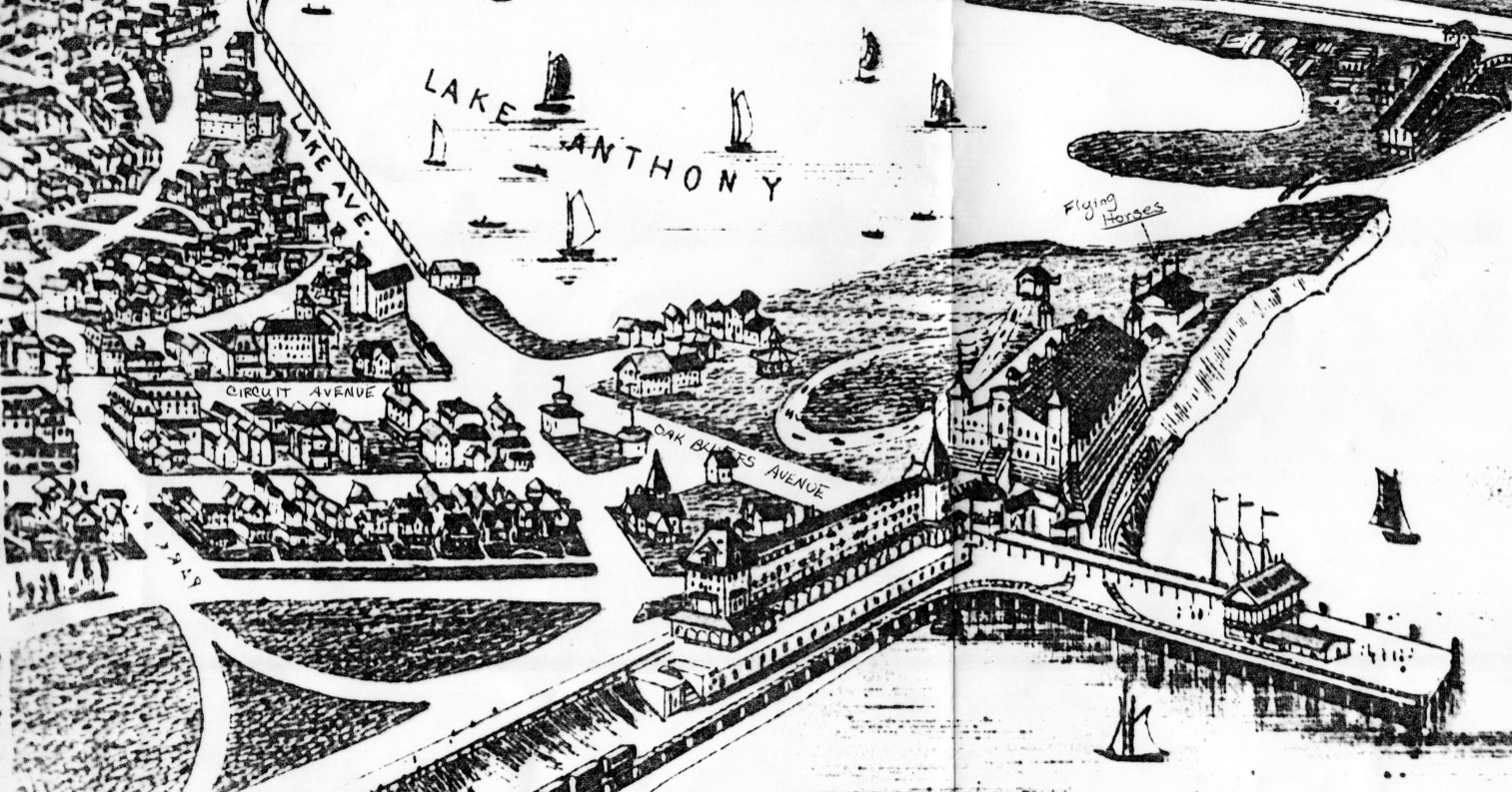
This 1880s scene of Oak Bluffs shows the carousel in its first location.

The carousel was listed on the National Register of Historic Places in 1979, and designated a National Historic Landmark in 1986. It is one of the two oldest operating carousels in the United States; the other, the Flying Horse Carousel in Watch Hill, Rhode Island (also a National Historic Landmark), is of a similar vintage, and is also a Dare Company carousel.

== Description ==
The carousel is sited on a roughly triangular piece of land at the base of Circuit Avenue in Oak Bluffs that is bounded by Circuit Avenue, Oak Bluffs Avenue, Lake Avenue and Kennebec Avenue. Its address is 33 Oak Bluffs Avenue. Since being moved to the island, it has been housed in a somewhat utilitarian single-story building. It is sheathed in painted vertical pine boards, and has a low gable roof.

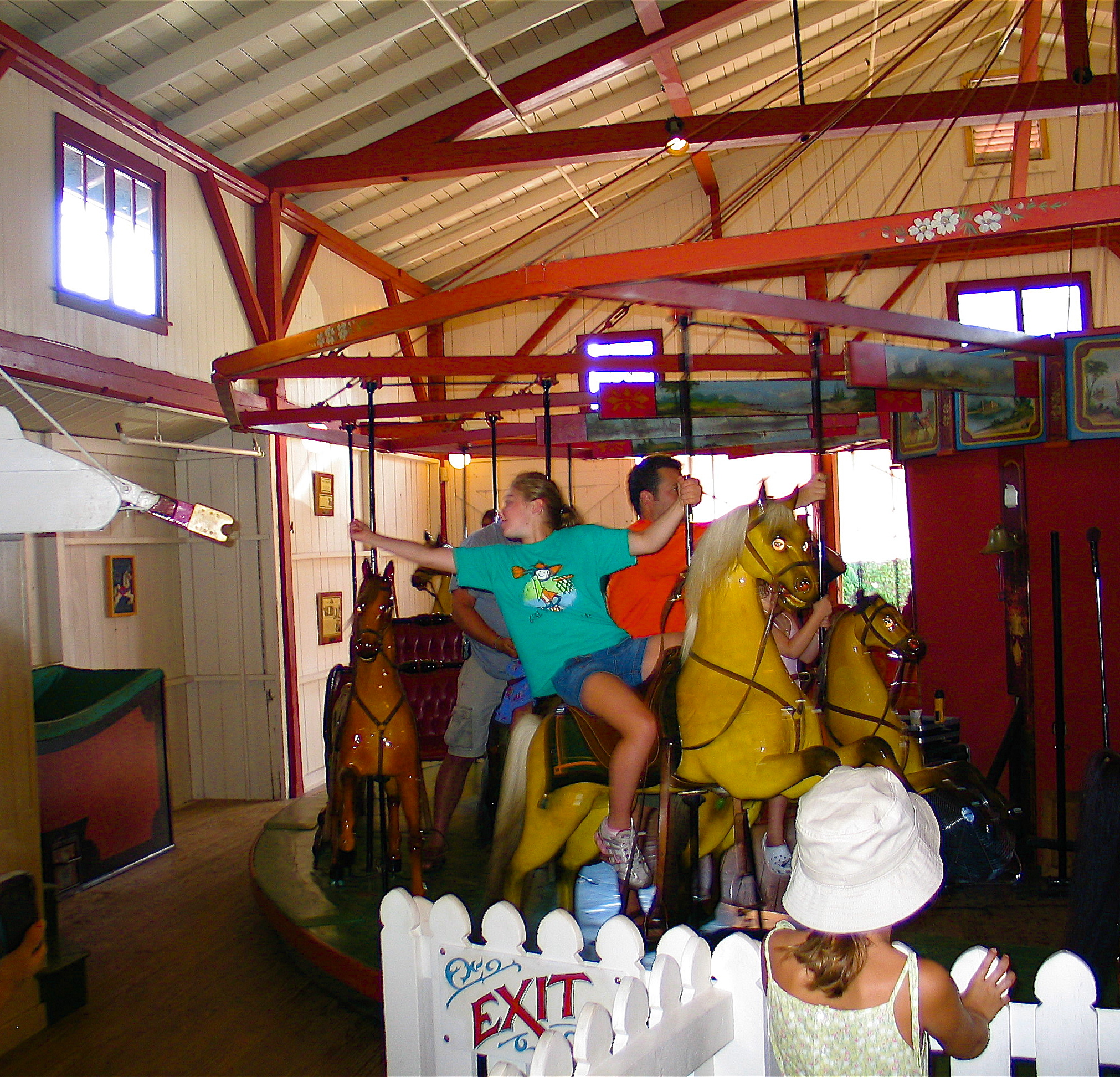
A rider of the carousel reaches for the brass ring.

The carousel is about 36 feet (11 m) in diameter. Fourteen spreader panels radiate from the central platform, and are secured to the upper canopy by the columns that also support the horses and carriages of the carousel. Despite the name "Flying Horses" (given by Joseph Turnell), the horses are stationary when the carousel is rotating. The horses have their original oxide eyes, but their original horsehair manes have been lost.

The layout of the horses and carriages is as follows: a chariot, two pair of horses, a chariot, three pairs of horses, and then the entire sequence repeated. The panels that decorate the carousel, including those surrounding the central column housing the carousel machinery, depict equestrian and marine scenes. By the 1980s, these panels, needing restoration, had been removed and replaced by panels of local scenes done by a local artist. When the site was purchased by the Martha's Vineyard Land Trust, the Flying Horses underwent an extensive restoration, returning the carousel to its original appearance, complete with the historic panel paintings that were done by a Dare Company artist.

Although originally powered by steam, the carousel was converted to electricity in 1900, and is powered by a 10-horsepower motor located in the building's basement. The gears and belts connecting the motor to the carousel were rehabilitated in the 1980s. The ride has a traditional ring assembly, where the lucky rider who successfully grabs a brass ring gets a free ride.

The carousel’s music is provided by a 1923 Wurlitzer #103 Band Organ.

== See also ==
- Amusement rides on the National Register of Historic Places
- List of National Historic Landmarks in Massachusetts
- National Register of Historic Places listings in Dukes County, Massachusetts
