= Highland Park Dentzel Carousel and Shelter Building =

Carousel in Meridian, Mississippi

- Highland Park Dentzel Carousel
- U.S. National Register of Historic Places
- U.S. National Historic Landmark
- Mississippi Landmark
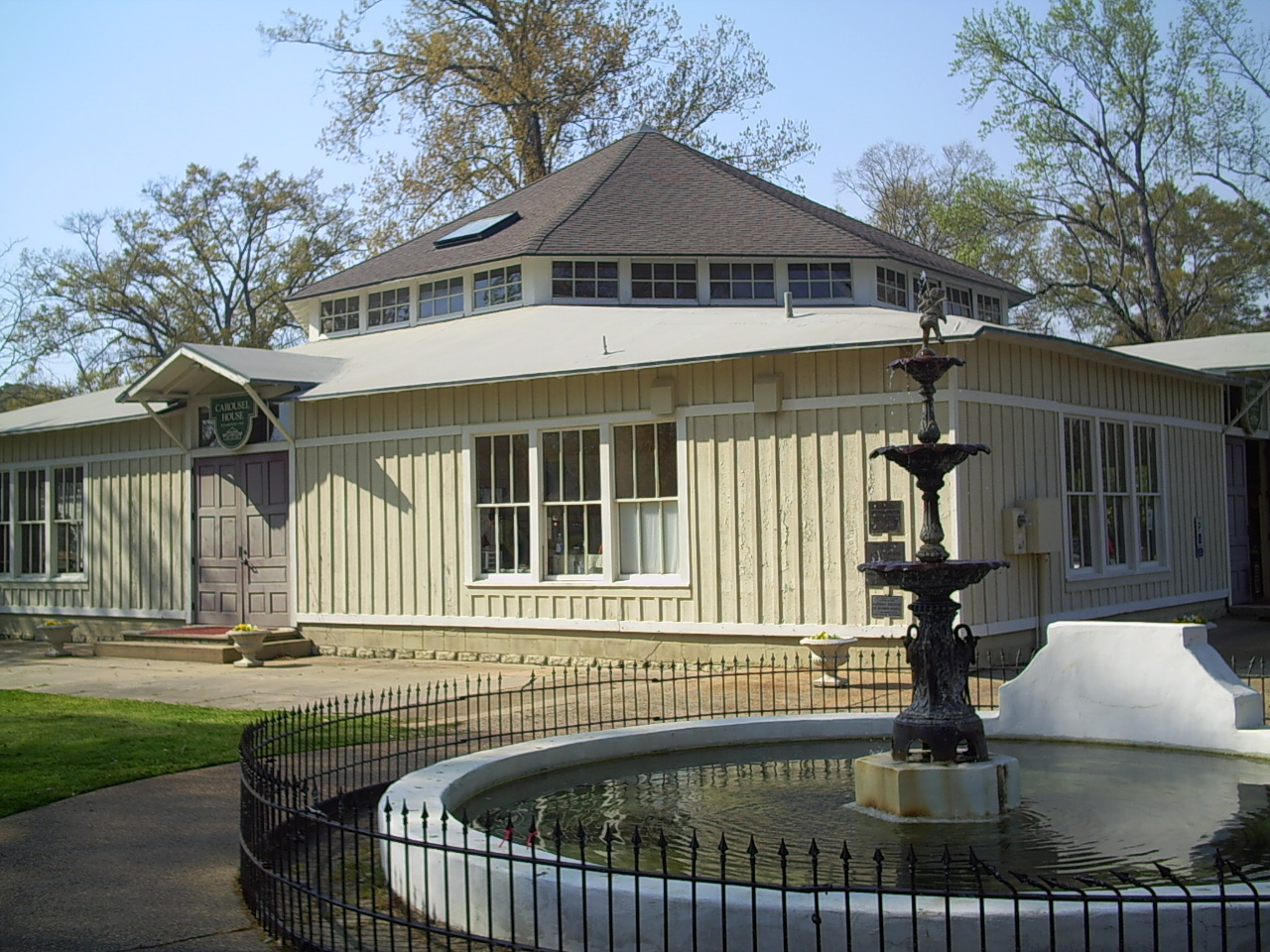
- Highland Park Dentzel Carousel in 2008

- Location within Mississippi Location within the United States
- Location: Meridian, Mississippi
- Coordinates: 32°22′36.67″N 88°43′7″W
- Built: 1896
- Architect: Dentzel Carousel Corp.
- NRHP reference No.: 87000863
- USMS No.: 075-MER-0961-NHL-ML

Significant dates
- Added to NRHP: February 27, 1987
- Designated NHL: February 27, 1987
- Designated USMS: August 1, 1984

The Highland Park Dentzel Carousel and Shelter Building is a carousel and building in Highland Park in Meridian, Mississippi. Manufactured about 1896 for the 1904 St. Louis Exposition by the Dentzel Carousel Company of Philadelphia, Pennsylvania, the carousel was sold and shipped to Meridian. Highland Park Dentzel Carousel has been in operation since 1909 and was declared a National Historic Landmark in 1987. It is the only remaining two-row stationary Dentzel menagerie in the world.

Its closest contemporaries both are held in Indiana. The Children's Museum carousel, also called The Carousel of Wishes and Dreams in Indianapolis, was probably manufactured pre-1900. It is not a pure Dentzel product, though; much of the original carousel has been modified from its original design. In Logansport, the Spencer Park Dentzel Carousel has been partially restored. It is dated between 1900 and 1903, although it may predate 1900 as well.

== The Carousel ==
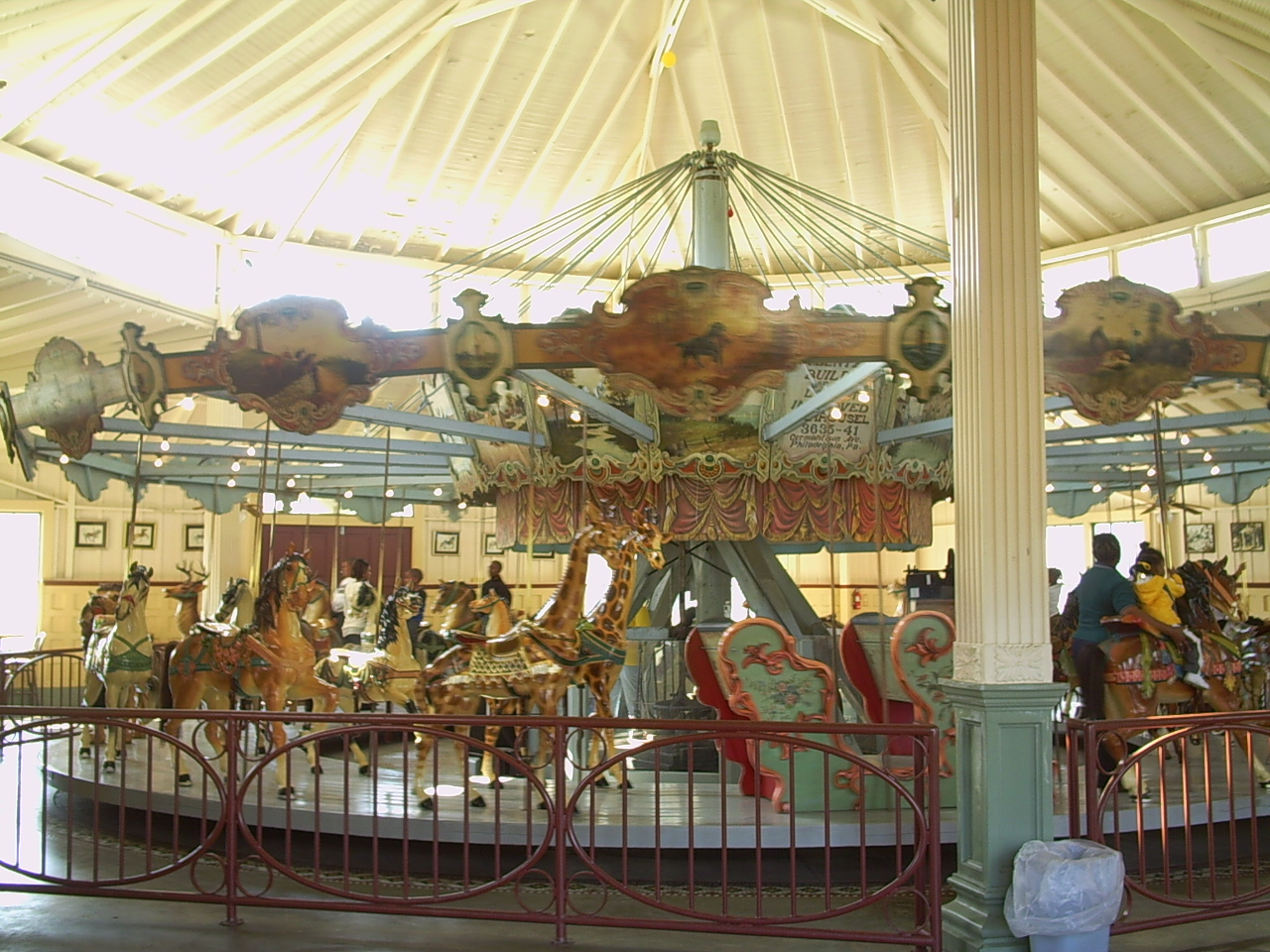
Inside view of carousel

Original oil paintings of museum quality adorn the top crown of the carousel. The carousel is approximately 30 feet (9.1 m) in diameter, smaller than the time's standard 2-abreast — 42 feet (13 m) in diameter, with 28 animals, two-abreast, and 2 chariots, providing seating for 36 people. All 28 animals on the carousel, including a lion, a tiger, 2 deer, 2 antelope, 2 giraffes, and 20 horses, are meticulously hand-carved of brass and poplar wood and have been recently restored to their original beauty.

Meridian's Dentzel Carousel arrived in the city in 1909 and has since occupied the same location in Highland Park. Its house, also a National Historic Landmark, is the only remaining original carousel building built from a Dentzel blueprint.

The carousel building was closed from 1983 to 1984 for major restoration, performed by Ralph E. Young Contractor, Inc. The carousel animals were removed and placed in various local institutions while funds were raised.

From 1984 to 1995, the animals, chariots, and canvas oil paintings of the carousel were meticulously restored to their original beauty. Colors and designs were documented with careful color matching, tracing of designs, working drawings, and photographs showing where colors and designs originally occurred. The restoration was done by Rosa Ragan of Raleigh, N.C., one of the foremost restoration specialists in the U.S.

== The building ==
Built from a Dentzel blueprint, the carousel's shelter building is a rectangular building approximately 70 by 75 by 22 feet (21.3 m × 22.9 m × 6.7 m) with board and batten siding. The exterior of the building is distinctive in appearance with a low, square, main block and a central section of octagonal roof with clerestory light windows. The clerestory is about 40 feet (12 m) in diameter and lights the interior. Inside the building, the original mosaic tile floor with a large snowflake pattern in green, yellow, terracotta, and white is intact. The carousel house has recently (1983–84) been restored, using a combination of city funds via private donations from "Friends of the Carousel," grants, fund-raisers, city budgeted money, and a small National Park Service grant.

== Dentzel Carousels ==
The Dentzels have been credited with essentially jump-starting the carousel industry in America. The family's work has been praised for the artistry of its carving and even described as "the finest built." This characterization especially applies to their work up to 1910. Some Dentzels of the time were as large as 54 ft (16 m) in diameter carrying up to 72 animals and four chariots and contained animals such as cats, dogs, rabbits, goats, pigs, donkeys, kangaroos, giraffes, lions, tigers, deer, buffaloes, ostriches, and more.

Gustav A. Dentzel, a young German immigrant, began building carousels in Philadelphia, Pennsylvania in 1864. It is commonly believed that several parts for his first American carousel were imported from his father, Michael Dentzel, who manufactured carousels in Kreuznach, in present-day Germany. Gustav continued to construct and sell carousels in America until his death in 1908 in the Germantown section of Philadelphia. Gustav's two sons, William H. Dentzel and Edward P. Dentzel, continued their father's craft after his death, keeping the business running in Philadelphia until 1928, when William died. Edward continued the business for a short while in California, but quickly gave up the craft after the stock market crash of 1929 and the Great Depression to build homes in Beverly Hills, CA.

In the early 1970s, Edward's son, William H. Dentzel II, developed and produced a line of children's carousels finished in traditional Dentzel style with mirrors, artwork, lights and band organ music. He continued working in his grandfather's and father's footsteps until his death in 1991.

William H. Dentzel III, William II's son, and his three children, Zaryn, Sophia, and Noah, follow in the family tradition. David M. Dentzel, William III's younger brother, has also carved several large horses and menagerie animals. A Dentzel carousel from the closed Woodland Park is installed at Memorial Hall in Fairmount Park inside the new home of the Please Touch Museum in Philadelphia which opened in October 2008.

== See also ==
- Amusement rides on the National Register of Historic Places
- Broad Ripple Park Carousel, in Indianapolis, Indiana
- Spencer Park Dentzel Carousel, in Logansport, Indiana
