= Nunley's =

Carousel and amusement park in New York

Nunley's was a carousel and amusement park that was located in Baldwin, Nassau County, New York from 1940 to 1995. The namesake carousel was located in Golden City Park, within the neighborhood of Canarsie, Brooklyn, New York City, from 1912 to 1939.

== History ==
=== Brooklyn, New York (1912–1939) ===
Nunley's Carousel, originally known as "Murphy's" carousel, was created in 1912 by the Stein and Goldstein Artistic Carousell Co. of Brooklyn, New York and installed in Golden City Park in Canarsie, on the Brooklyn waterfront, where it operated for 20 years. The New York Times notes: "The horses were carved in Coney Island style, which eschewed the look of docile ponies and prancing fillies and produced much more muscular, ferocious creatures with bared teeth and heads often lifted in motion."

In the spring of 1940, when the Belt Parkway was planned in the area, the carousel was moved to Baldwin, on the border abutting Freeport.

=== Baldwin, New York (1940–1995) ===
In Baldwin, Nunley's was located on Sunrise Highway, on the border with Freeport, New York, and operated from 1940 to 1995. Nunley's Carousel and Amusement Park was established by William Nunley, a third-generation amusement park entrepreneur, who also operated facilities in Bethpage, in Queens (in Broad Channel and Rockaway Beach), and in Westchester County (in Yonkers), New York. The children's amusement park featured a roller coaster, little boats atop water, hand pedal cars on a track, a Ferris wheel, spin tubs, kiddie cars, planes, a miniature golf course, and a carousel. Often, the parents of visiting children had ridden the very same carousel when they were small. Children clambered up to the same old-fashioned ticket booth and sometimes pointed out its most famous resident, a man with white hair, whom they often called Mr. Nunley.

Nunley's restaurant served a cheeseburger deluxe, hamburgers, hot dogs, pastrami on rye, pizza, fountain soda, soft serve ice-cream in vanilla, chocolate, or twists with sprinkles, and bags of French fries slathered in ketchup. It was a popular arcade hot spot during the '80s gaming boom, featuring all of the latest games, but it also housed classics from generations gone past. There was an old fortune teller machine, much like the one featured in Tom Hanks' movie Big (1988), pinball, a coin-operated dancing clown band, and a number of skee ball lanes.

Nunley's underwent a hepatitis B scare in the late '80s when one of the chefs was diagnosed with the disease; no patrons were affected.

In 1995, after operating Nunley's Carousel and Amusements for 56 years in Baldwin, the owners closed the park, retired, and sold the land to Pep Boys, which erected an automobile parts retail store on the site.

== Nunley's Carousel ==
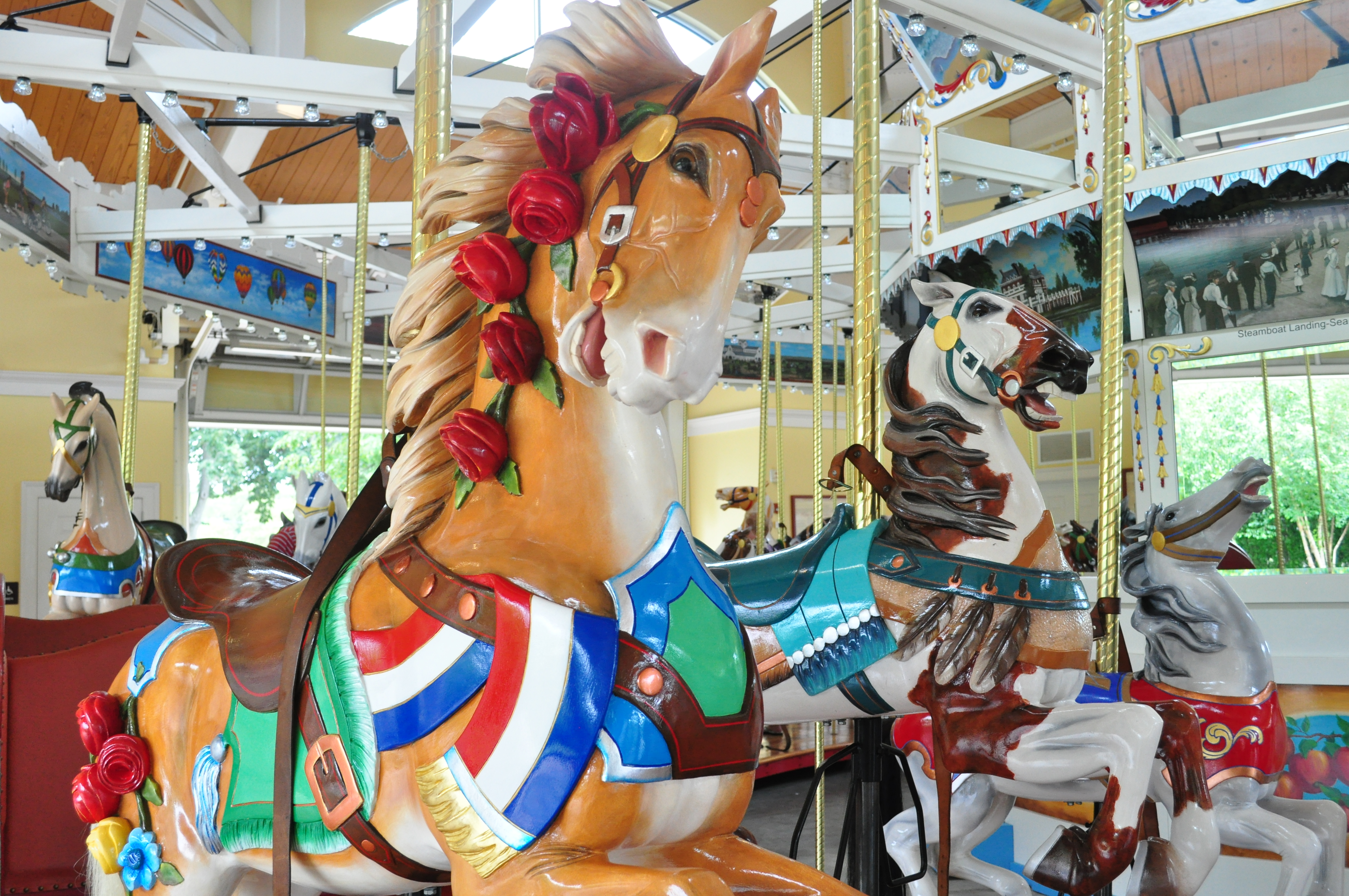
Nunleys Carousel (2013)

When Nunley's closed in 1995, Nassau County rescued the carousel, legally seizing it to ensure it was not sold off piecemeal. The New York Times reports: "The price was decided in State Supreme Court; the owners received $854,400 from the county." The article continues:

"The county recognized the carousel as a valuable historic artifact," said Gary Monti, the carousel's custodian since the county took possession. He is also an employee at the Cradle of Aviation Museum, which shares space in the hangar that is the carousel's current home. "In their day, carousels like these weren't thought of as anything but a kiddie ride," Mr. Monti said. "But by the 1970's [sic], they became appreciated as beautiful works of folk art."

After purchasing the carousel, Nassau County stored it in a hangar in Mitchel Field, next to the Cradle of Aviation museum. The neglected carousel languished there "in obscurity" for nearly 10 years, "neglected", "gathering dust", the hand-carved horses "coated in multiple layers of chipped and cracked paint", and "some of the Victorian paintings on the carousel's panels [had] deteriorated beyond recognition. The horsehair tails on many of the horses [had] been shredded to mere stumps, and some were even shabbily replaced with pieces of cut-up black shag rug."

=== Carousel refurbishing ===
Nonetheless, "affection for the carousel [was] powerful and widespread". For example, Long Island native Billy Joel wrote "Waltz #1 (Nunley's Carousel)" (2001) as a tribute to the beloved attraction, which he enjoyed riding on as a child. (The song was featured in his Broadway jukebox musical Movin' Out (2002) and on the show's original cast soundtrack.) Now residing in Oyster Bay, Long Island, the singer was unsuccessful in having the carousel moved out of storage and placed in a park in Oyster Bay.

In August 2007, two trucks from Carousel Works in Ohio, the largest manufacturer of wooden merry-go-rounds in the world, arrived at Museum Row at Mitchel Field and removed pieces of the Carousel for restoration at the company's headquarters in Mansfield, Ohio. In the fall of 2008, the restored carousel was returned for reassembly on a new plaza between the Cradle of Aviation Museum and Long Island Children's Museum in East Garden City, New York. It now plays a special soundtrack provided by Billy Joel. The singer-songwriter was asked if he would allow his "Waltz No. 1, Op. 2," which is subtitled "Nunley's Carousel" and is inspired by his childhood rides on it, to be played on the restored carousel organ. A Joel spokesman said Joel arranged for David Rosenthal, his keyboard player, to go into a studio to record the piano composition with a carousel organ-like instrumentation.

The restoration was paid for with $420,000 from discretionary capital funds controlled by Nassau County Legislator Joseph Scannell (D-Baldwin), along with money raised by Pennies for Ponies, a nonprofit group started by then 11-year-old Rachel Obergh, of Wantagh, New York. Additionally, many of the carousel animals were adopted for restoration for $2,000 each by schools, a Baldwin hardware store, the Lercari family (who owned Nunley's), and Nassau County Executive Thomas Suozzi. The county also budgeted $1 million for a new enclosure for the carousel.

On March 15, 2009, after painstakingly restoring the carousel to its former glory, Nassau County reopened the carousel in its new home, the Cradle of Aviation Museum on Museum Row, near the Nassau Coliseum in Garden City, Long Island. The caretakers for the old carousel said that it was scheduled to open for rides on Saturday, May 2, 2009.

=== Today ===
Nunley's Carousel, now on display on Museum Row in Garden City, has scores of painted wooden panels, 41 horses, two sit down chariots, a stand still lion, the original Wurlitzer calliope, and the brass ring machine comprising a wooden arm filled with silver and brass rings, which reaches out toward the carousel so that passerby riders can reach out and grab them. If a patron grabs a brass ring, s/he wins a free ride on the carousel.

Only three of the 17 carousels built by Stein & Goldstein remain intact: Nunley's Carousel, the Michael Friedsam Memorial Carousel in Central Park, New York City, and the Bushnell Park Carousel in Hartford, Connecticut.

The Baldwin Civic Association commissioned a mural of Nunley's Carousel by artist Michael White, which was unveiled at a ceremony at the Cradle of Aviation Museum on March 9, 2019. It was installed at the Baldwin station of the Long Island Rail Road on April 22, 2019.

== Nunley's Ferris Wheel ==
The original Nunley's Ferris wheel was purchased at auction by Stephen Lanning and is now located in at Jordan Lobster Farms Island Park, New York. The Ferris wheel is on display, but it is not powered or in running condition.

There is a sign near the Ferris wheel that reads:

Nunley's Ferris Wheel Originally Located on the Freeport/Baldwin Border, Brought Great Pleasure to Long Island Families for Generations. It has Now Been Relocated here at Barnum Island.

== Other Nunley's rides and games ==
Other Nunley's rides and games were sold at auction after the park closed in 1995 and are now scattered all over the country.

== In popular culture ==
Billy Joel's instrumental piece "Waltz # 1 (Nunley's Carousel)" (2001) appeared in the Broadway musical Movin' Out (2002) and is featured on the original cast recording.

In an episode of HBO's Entourage, while playing golf by his pool, Eric Murphy makes a reference to his niece playing mini golf at Nunley's as a child, though this reference is chronologically impossible. At the time of the reference (2005), Eric's six-year-old niece would have been born after Nunley's had closed.

== See also ==
- Nunley's Happyland
