= Cass County Dentzel Carousel =

Carousel in Logansport, Indiana

- Spencer Park Dentzel Carousel
- U.S. National Register of Historic Places
- U.S. National Historic Landmark
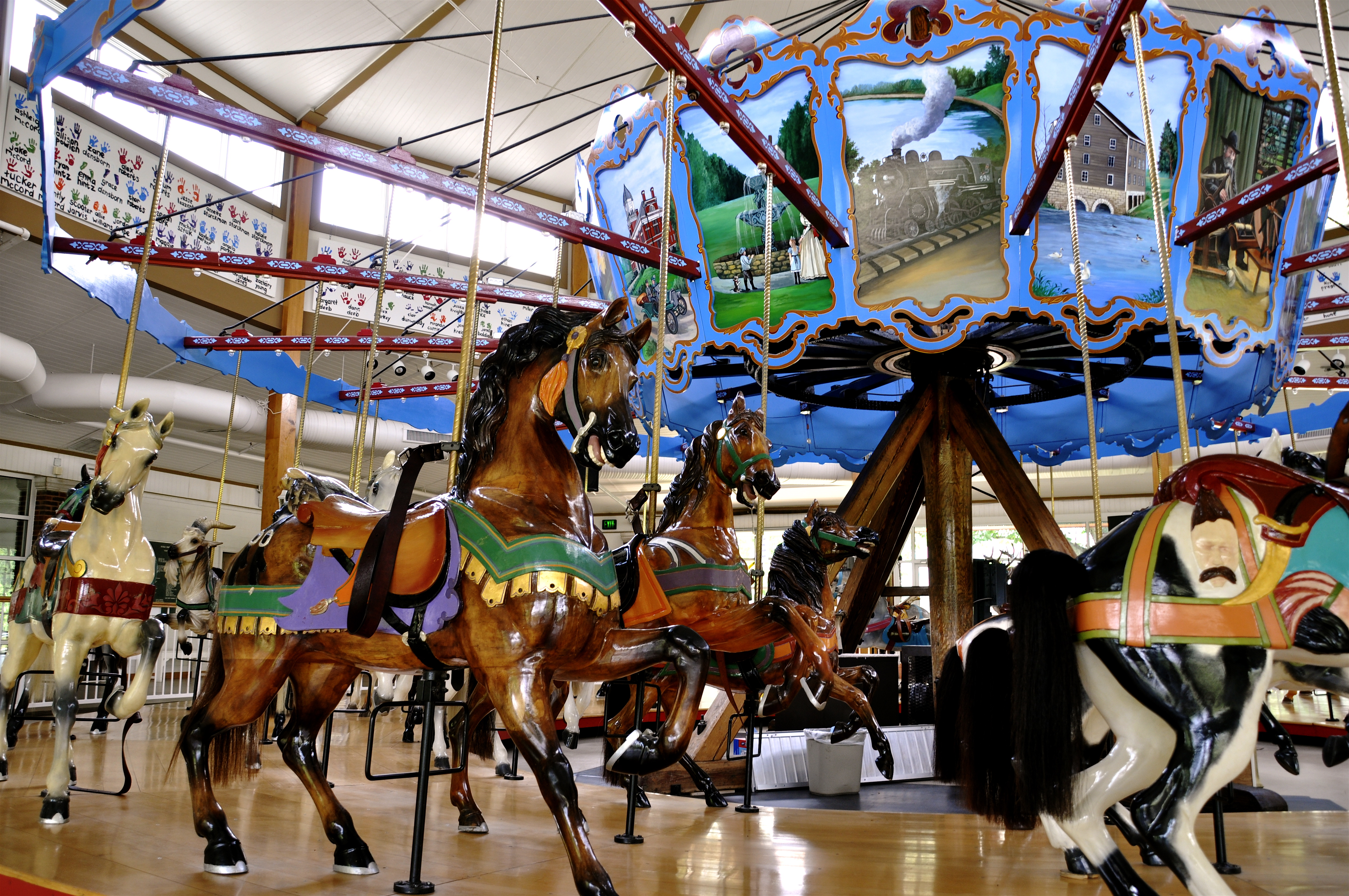
- Animals on the carousel

- Location within Cass County, Indiana Location within Indiana Location within the United States
- Location: Riverside Park, Logansport, Indiana
- Coordinates: 40°45′33.94″N 86°21′20.08″W
- Built: 1900
- Architect: Dentzel Carousel Corp.
- NRHP reference No.: 87000838

Significant dates
- Added to NRHP: February 27, 1987
- Designated NHL: February 27, 1987

The Cass County Dentzel Carousel, formerly known as the Spencer Park Dentzel Carousel and also known as the Riverside Park Dentzel Carousel or Logansport Carousel, is a historic carousel in Riverside Park of Logansport, Indiana. Built by the Dentzel Carousel Company, probably by 1900, it is one of the company's oldest surviving menagerie-style carousels, with animals likely hand-carved by George Dentzel. It was declared a National Historic Landmark in 1987.

== Description and history ==
The carousel is now located in the playground area of Logansport's Riverside Park, in a utilitarian multisided building. It is 42 feet (13 m) in diameter, with animals arrayed three abreast on its sixteen spreading platforms. The animals depicted include deer, giraffes, a lion and a tiger, and a variety of horses. There are four two-seat chariots. The carousel includes its original mechanism for dispensing rings, in which the recipient of the brass ring is awarded a free ride. The organ and power plant (electric now, but originally steam) are of uncertain provenance, and may not be original.

The exact construction date of the carousel is not known. It has been estimated to have been built c. 1900–1903, but may be older. It was apparently built for the Fort Wayne Consolidated Railway Company, which operated Robison Park, an amusement park outside Fort Wayne. The park closed in 1919, and the carousel was then moved to Logansport, where it operated in Spencer Park for many years. In 1949 it was moved to Riverside Park, and in 1972 it was purchased by the non-profit Cass County Carousel. In 1993 it underwent a complete restoration, in which its original paint job was restored.

Two other existing Dentzel Carousel Company carousels are also declared National Historic Landmarks. The Highland Park Dentzel Carousel and Shelter Building survives in Mississippi and the Broad Ripple Park Carousel is in Indianapolis.

== See also ==
- Amusement rides on the National Register of Historic Places
- List of National Historic Landmarks in Indiana
- National Register of Historic Places listings in Cass County, Indiana
