= Dentzel Carousel =

Dentzel Carousel may refer to:

- Dentzel Carousel Company, American builder of carousels in Philadelphia, Pennsylvania in the late 19th and early 20th century
- Carousel at Glen Echo Park, Maryland
- Highland Park Dentzel Carousel and Shelter Building, historic carousel and building in Highland Park in Meridian, Mississippi, U.S.
- Spencer Park Dentzel Carousel, also known as Riverside Park Dentzel Carousel, a carousel in Riverside Park of Logansport, Indiana, U.S.
- Weona Park Carousel, also known as Dentzel Stationary Menagerie Carousel, historic carousel in Pen Argyl, Northampton County, Pennsylvania, U.S.
- William H. Dentzel 1921 Carousel, Pennsylvania
- Kiddy Kingdom Carousel, also known as William H. Dentzel 1924 Carousel, Ohio
