= Dentzel Carousel Company =

American carousel builder

G.A. Dentzel Carousel Company
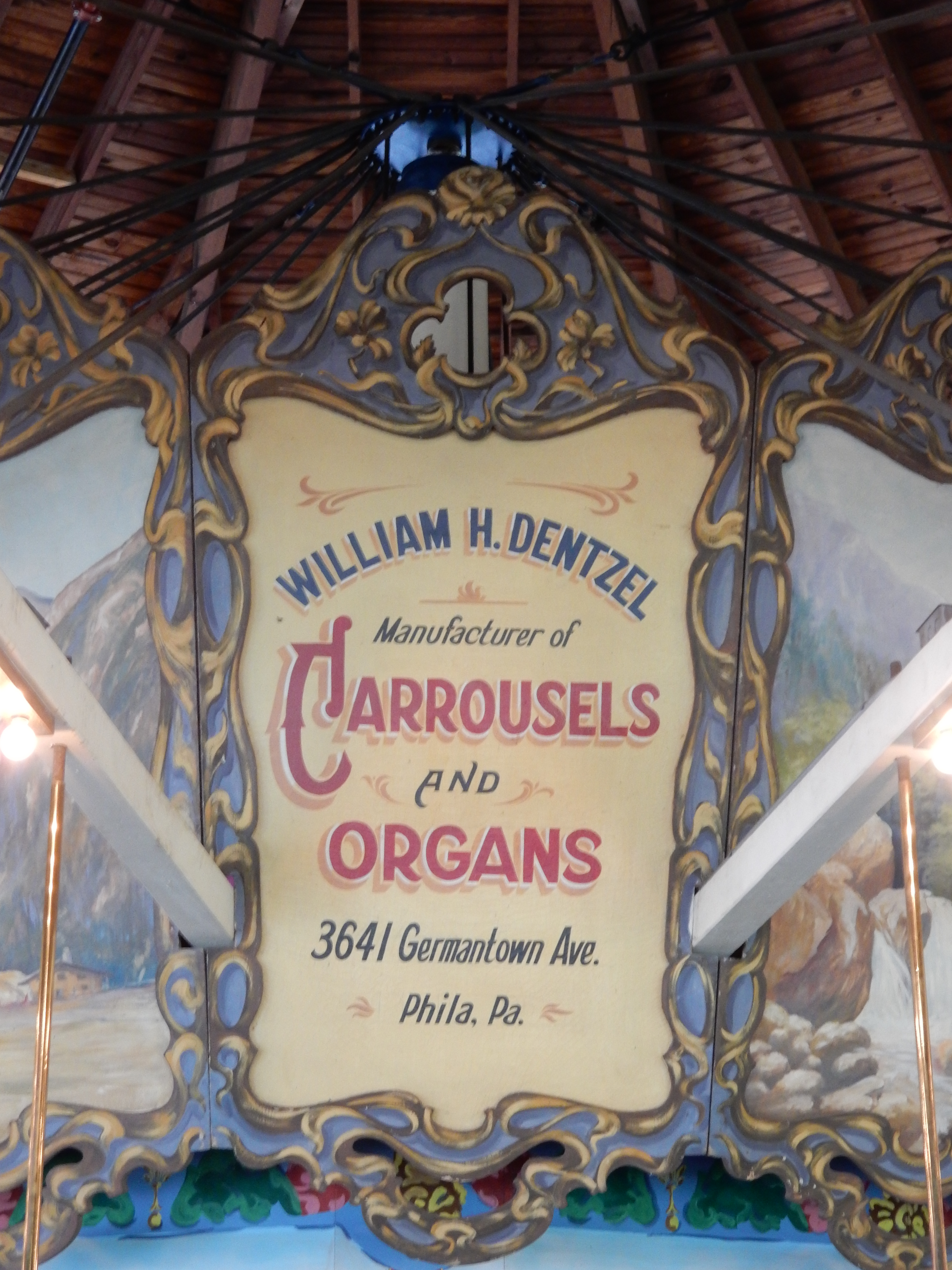
- Formerly: G.A. Dentzel, Steam and Horsepower Carrousel Builder
- Industry: Carousel Builder
- Founded: 1867 Philadelphia, Pennsylvania, United States
- Founder: Gustav Dentzel
- Defunct: 1928
- Successor: Philadelphia Toboggan Coasters
- Headquarters: Philadelphia, Pennsylvania, United States
- Key people: Gustav Dentzel, William Dentzel
- Products: Carousels

The G.A. Dentzel Company was an American builder of carousels in Philadelphia, Pennsylvania, United States, in the late 19th and early 20th centuries.

== History ==
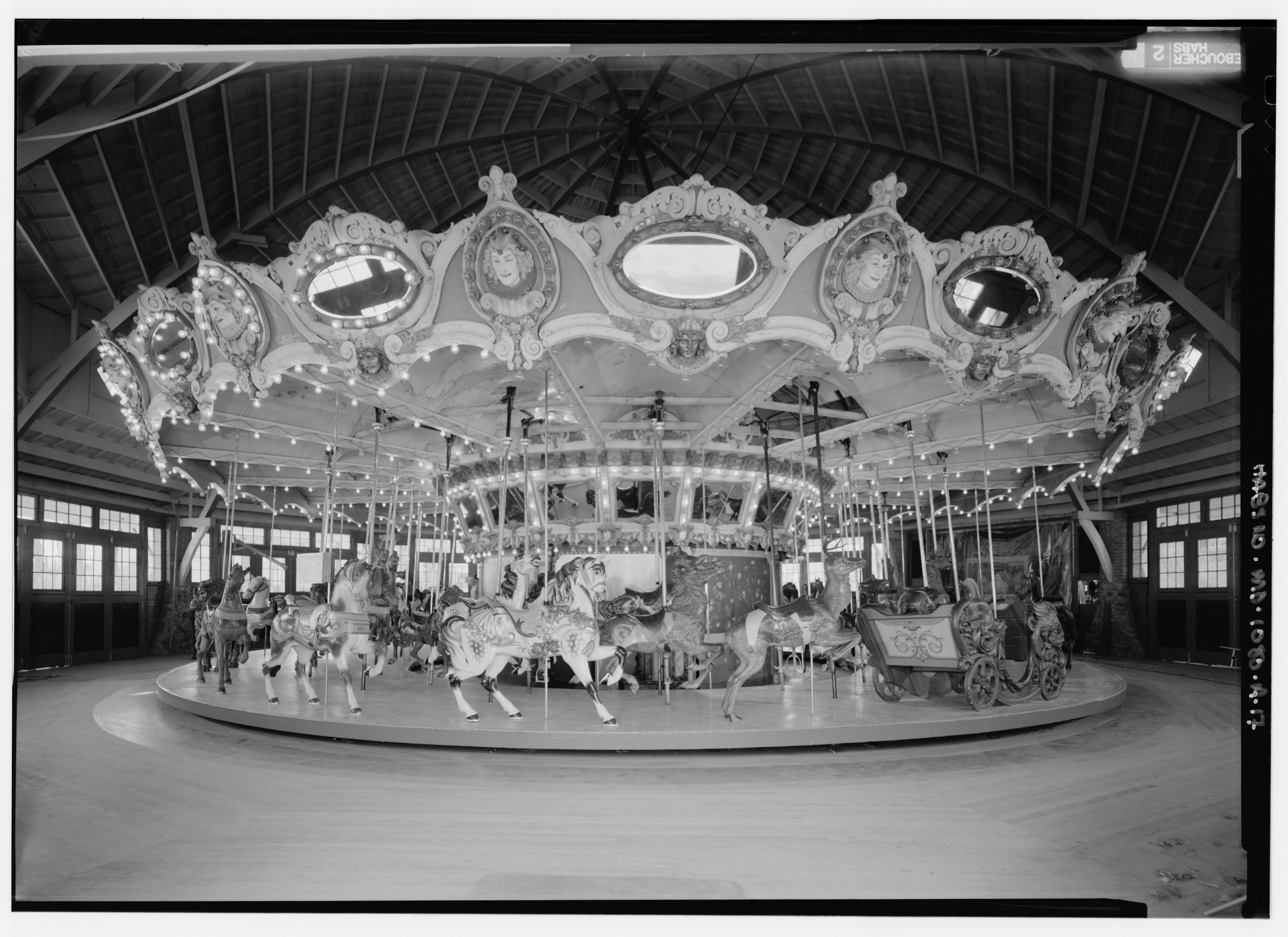
Glen Echo Park carousel, Montgomery County, Maryland

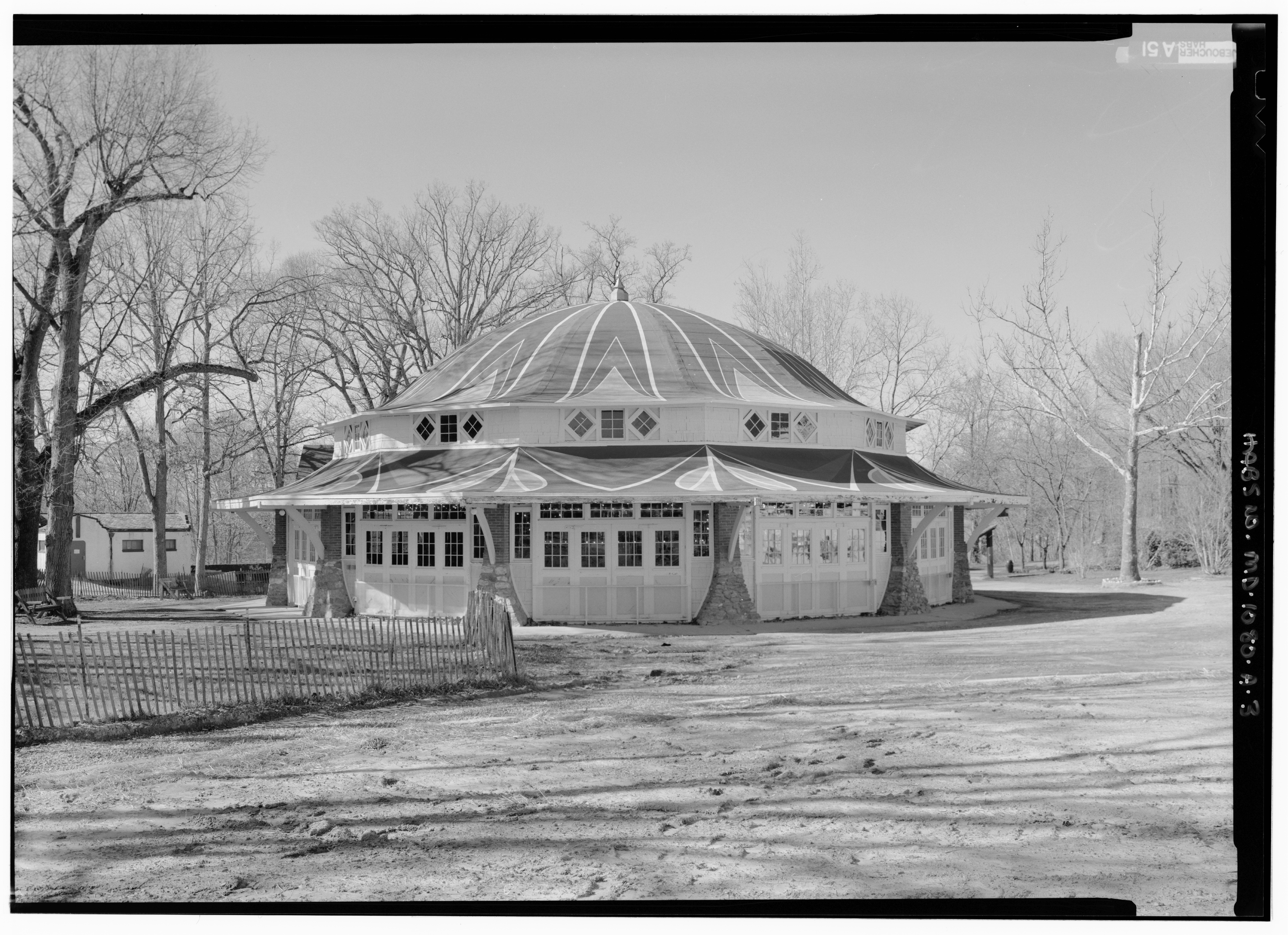
Glen Echo Park carousel building

Its founder, Gustav Dentzel, had immigrated to the United States in 1864, from Germany. Having carved carousels for his father before immigrating he opened a cabinet making shop on Germantown Ave. in Philadelphia. He soon tired of the cabinet making business and decided to try his hand at building a small portable carousel that he could travel with around the country. After finding that people had a great enthusiasm for his carousel he decided to go into the carousel building business full-time in 1867, hiring other woodworkers who had also emigrated from Europe. That same year, on Smith's Island adjacent to Philadelphia, Dentzel's company opened the first non-portable, permanently fixed amusement park carousel in the United States.

His son William took over the business after Gustav's death in 1909, and continued making carousels until 1928, with employees such as master-carvers Salvatore "Cherni" Cernigliaro and Daniel Muller. After William's death, Muller went on to form his own carousel company, while the Dentzel equipment and remaining stock were sold to the Philadelphia Toboggan Company.

== Operating carousels in USA ==
Ride Name	Year built	Location	City	Figures	History
King Arthur Carrousel	1922	Disneyland	Anaheim, California	68 Jumpers, 1 Chariot	Sunnyside Park (1922–1954)
Merry-Go-Round	1912	Knott's Berry Farm	Buena Park, California	18 Jumpers, 10 Standing, 24 Menagerie, 2 Chariots	Hersheypark (1912–1936); Brady Park (1936–1955)
Merry-Go-Round	1907	Castle Park	Riverside, California	18 Jumpers, 12 Standing, 20 Menagerie, 2 Chariot	Hersheypark (1907–????); Knott's Berry Farm (1950s–1984)
Dentzel Carousel	1921	San Francisco Zoo	San Francisco, California	24 Jumpers, 12 Standing, 16 Menagerie, 2 Chariot	Pacific City Amusement Park (1921–1925)
Broad Ripple Park Carousel	1917	The Children's Museum of Indianapolis	Indianapolis, Indiana	17 Jumpers, 14 Standing, 11 Menagerie, 2 Chariot	Broad Ripple Park (1917–1956); Parks Department Indianapolis (1956–1969)
Spencer Park Dentzel Carousel	1902	Riverside Park	Logansport, Indiana	32 Standing, 11 Menagerie, 3 Chariot	Robison Park (1902–1919); Spencer Park (1919–1962) Riverside Park (1962–Present)
Carousel at Glen Echo Park	1921	Glen Echo Park	Glen Echo, Maryland	28 Jumpers, 12 Standing, 12 Menagerie, 2 Chariot	
Chesapeake Carousel	1905	Watkins Regional Park	Upper Marlboro, Maryland	15 Jumpers, 16 Standing, 13 Menagerie, 2 Chariot	Chesapeake Beach (1905–1972)
Highland Park Dentzel Carousel	1904	Highland Park	Meridian, Mississippi	20 Standing, 8 Menagerie, 2 Chariot	Louisiana Purchase Exposition (1904)
St. Louis Carousel	1921	Faust County Park	Chesterfield, Missouri	46 Jumpers, 16 Standing, 4 Menagerie, 2 Chariot	Forest Park Highlands (1929–1963); Storage (1963–1965); Sylvan Springs Park (1965–1980); Storage (1980–1987)
Antique Carousel	1898	Canobie Lake Park	Salem, New Hampshire	24 Jumpers, 19 Standing, 3 Menagerie, 2 Chariot	
Dr. Floyd L. Moreland Carousel	1910	Seaside Heights	Seaside Heights, New Jersey	35 Jumpers, 18 Standing, 5 Menagerie, 2 Chariot	Island Beach Park (1910–1928); Casino Pier (1932–2015)
Carousel	1905	Ontario Beach Park	Rochester, New York	22 Jumpers, 11 Standing, 19 Menagerie, 2 Chariot	
Menagerie Carousel	1905	Burlington City Park	Burlington, North Carolina	16 Jumpers, 10 Standing, 20 Menagerie, 2 Chariot	Locust Point (????-1924); Forest Park (1924–1948)
Pullen Park Carousel	1912	Pullen Park	Raleigh, North Carolina	19 Jumpers, 10 Standing, 23 Menagerie, 2 Chariot	Bloomsbury Park (1912–1915)
Kiddy Kingdom Carousel	1924	Cedar Point	Sandusky, Ohio	27 Jumpers, 14 Standing, 11 Menagerie, 2 Chariot	Hunting Park-Germantown (1936–1968)
Albany Carousel	1909	Albany Historic Carousel and Museum (Dentzel mechanism only)	Albany, Oregon	32 Jumpers, 16 Standing 2 Chariot	Downtown Albany (2017)
Antique Carousel	1921	Dorney Park & Wildwater Kingdom	Allentown, Pennsylvania	50 Jumpers, 12 Standing, 4 Menagerie, 2 Chariot	Exposition Park (1921–1941) Lake Lansing Amusement Center (Pine Lake) (1941–1971); Cedar Point (1971–1994)
Stoner Carousel	1924	Stoner Carousel Association	Lancaster, Pennsylvania	25 Jumpers, 8 Standing, 15 Menagerie, 2 Chariot	Rocky Springs Park (1901–1923); Rocky Springs Park (1924–1983); Lake Lansing Park (1983–1987); Dollywood (1990–1999); Storage (1999–present)
Weona Park Carousel	1900	Weona Park	Pen Argyl, Pennsylvania	34 Standing, 10 Menagerie, 2 Chariot	Original location unknown (1900–1924)
Woodside Park Carousel	1902	Please Touch Museum	Philadelphia, Pennsylvania	24 Jumpers, 16 Standing, 12 Menagerie, 2 Chariot	Woodside Amusement Park (1902–1955); Rockaways' Playland (1956–1961); Storage (1961–1962); St. John Terrell's Music Circus (1963–1966); Storage (Smithsonian Institution) (1966–2005); Restoration (2005–2008)
Grand Carousel	1926	Kennywood Park	West Mifflin, Pennsylvania	50 Jumpers, 14 Standing, 2 Menagerie, 4 Chariot	Commissioned by U.S. Government in 1926 for Philadelphia Sesquicentennial Celebration, but not finished in time and purchased by Kennywood.
Memphis Grand Carousel	1909	Children's Museum of Memphis	Memphis, Tennessee	32 Jumpers, 16 Standing 2 Chariot	Forest Park Amusement Park (1909–1923); Mid-South Fairgrounds (1923–1974); Storage (1974–1976); Libertyland (1976–2005); Storage and restoration (2005–2017)
Silver Star Carousel	1926	Six Flags Over Texas	Arlington, Texas	50 Jumpers, 16 Standing 2 Chariot	Rockaways' Playland (1926–1963)
Dentzel Carousel	1923	Fair Park	Dallas, Texas	50 Jumpers, 16 Standing 2 Chariot	Carsonia Park (1923–1950)

== Gallery ==
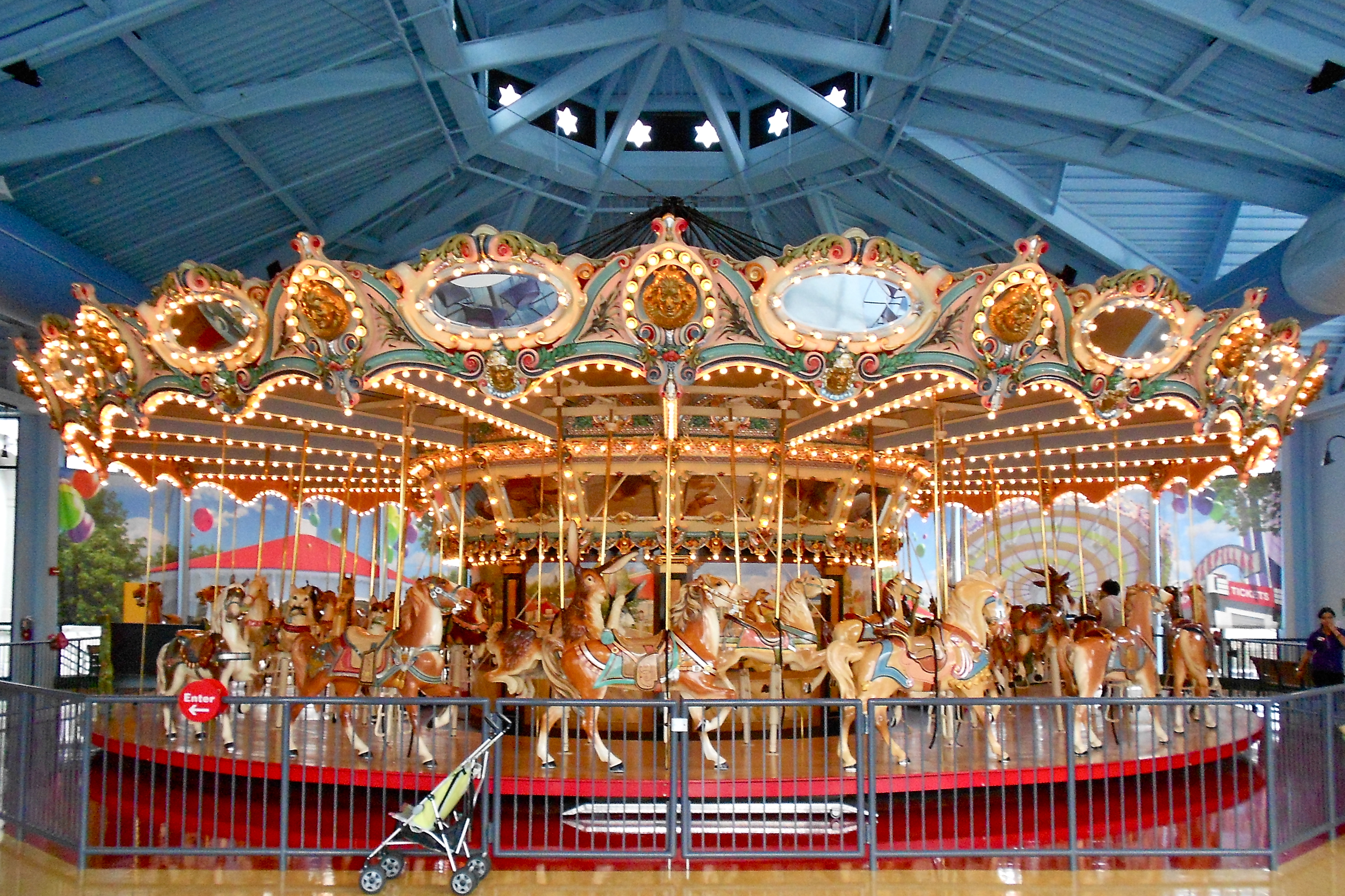
The Woodside Amusement Park Carousel, now at the Please Touch Museum

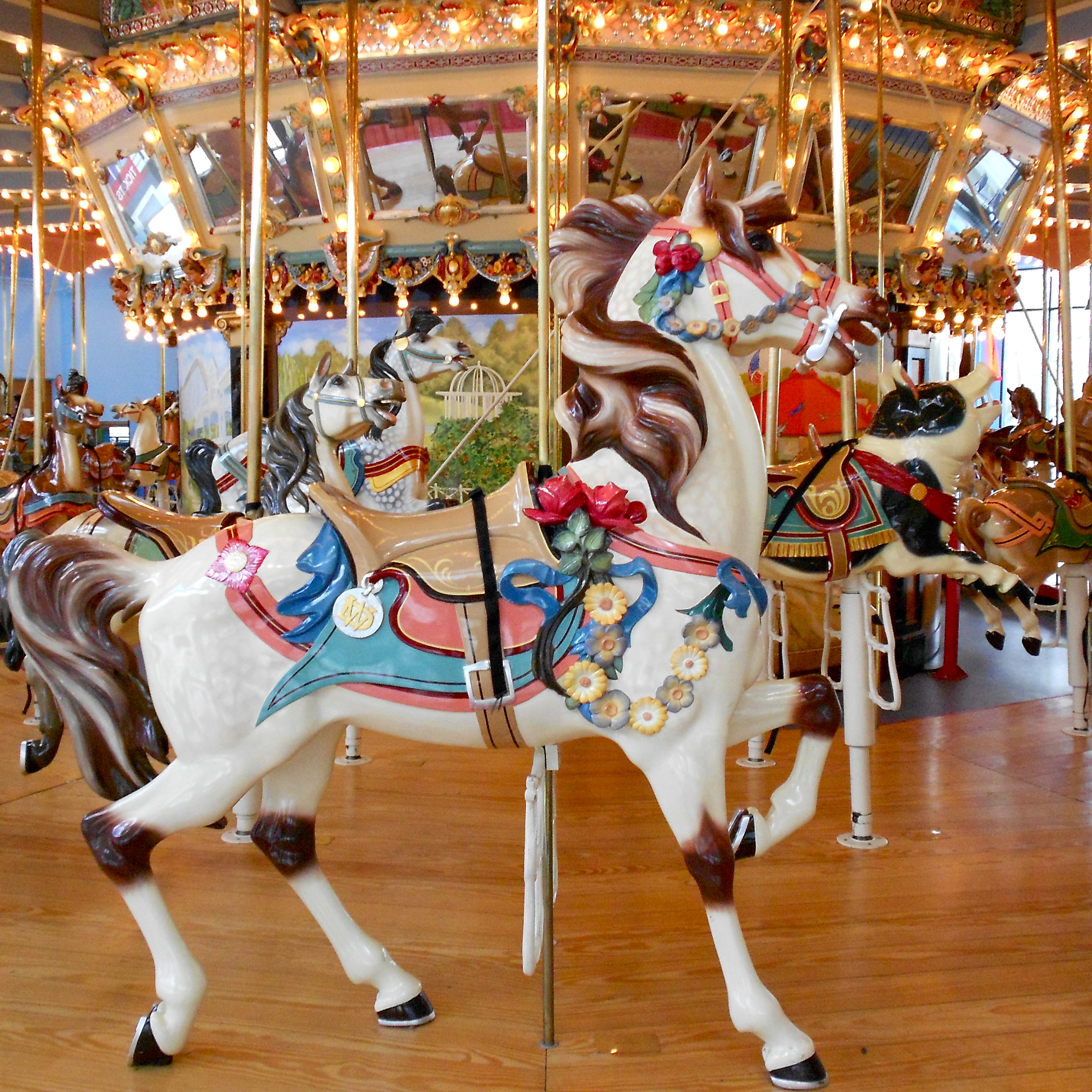
Lead horse on the Woodside Amusement Park Carousel

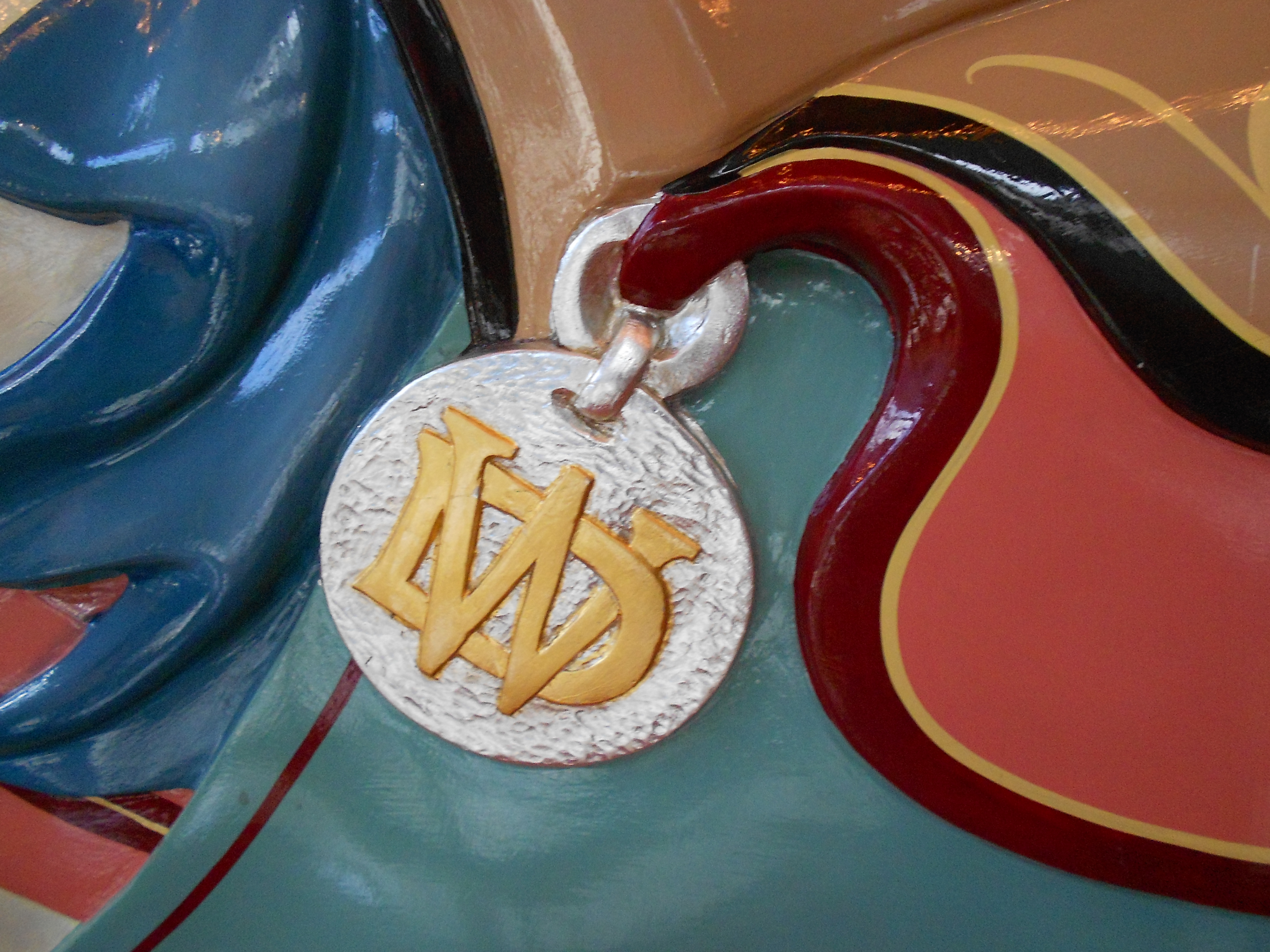
Maker's mark on the lead horse on the Woodside Amusement Park Carousel

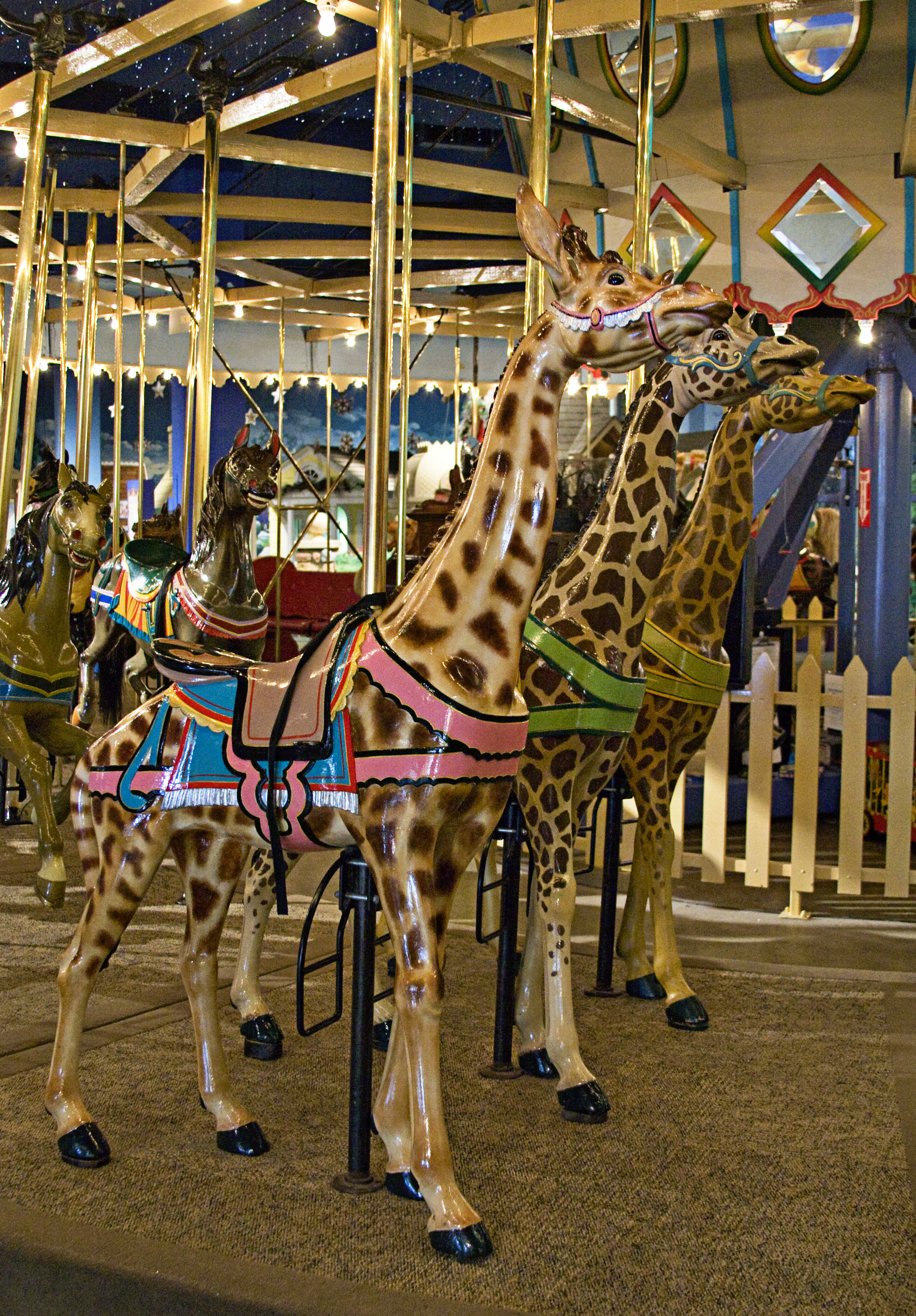
Row of giraffes on the Broad Ripple Park Carousel

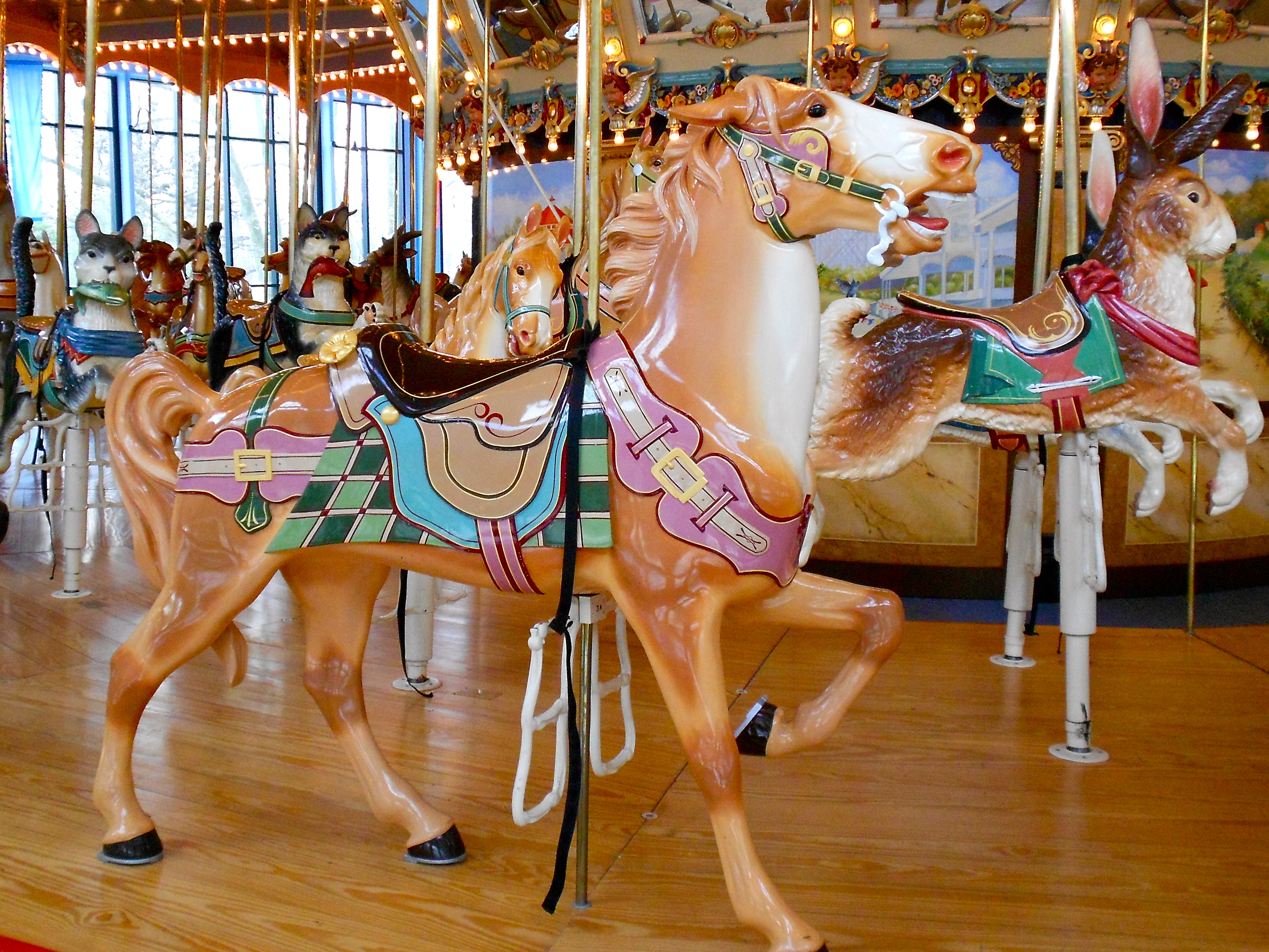
Horse on the Woodside Amusement Park Carousel

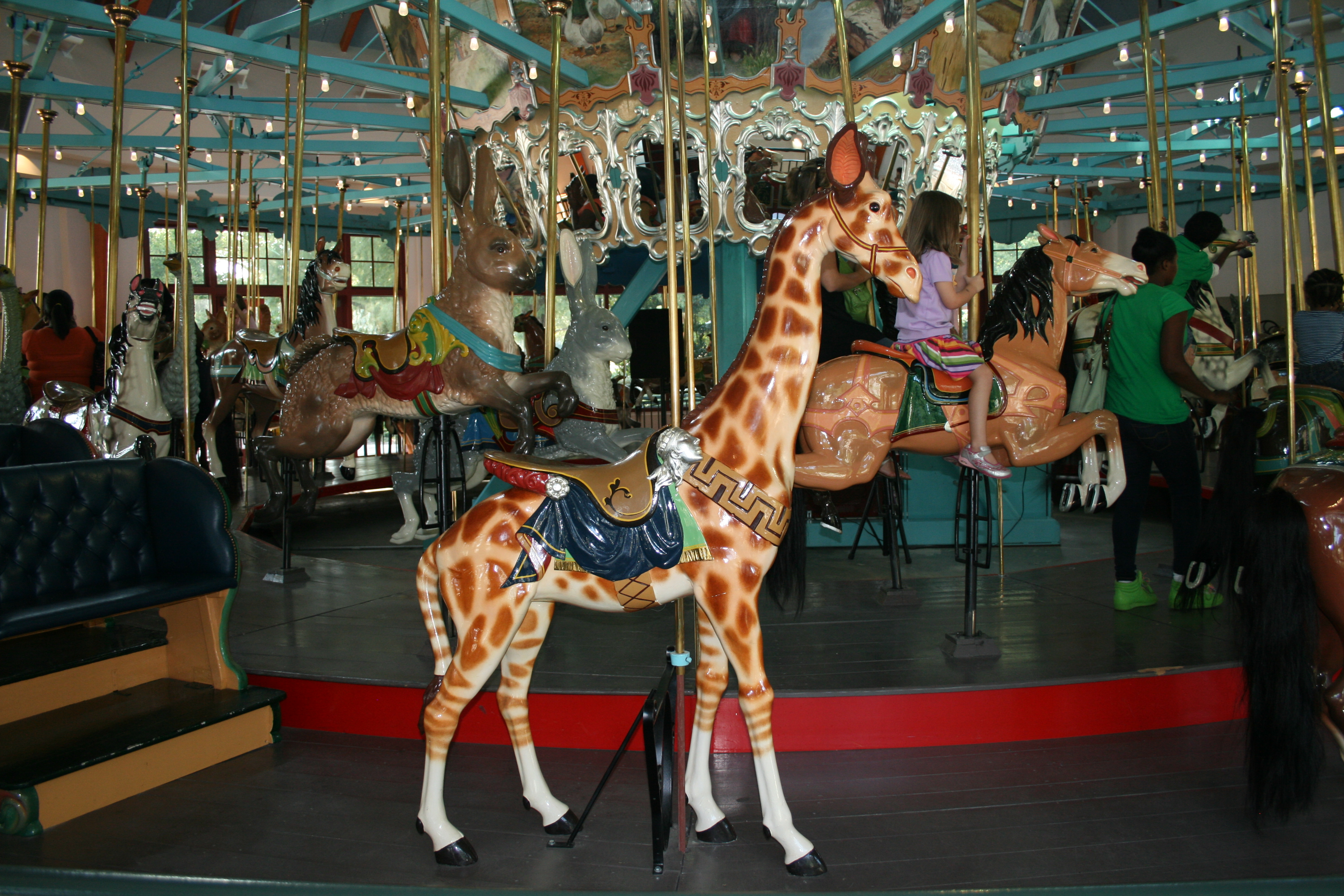
Giraffe at the Pullen Park Carousel

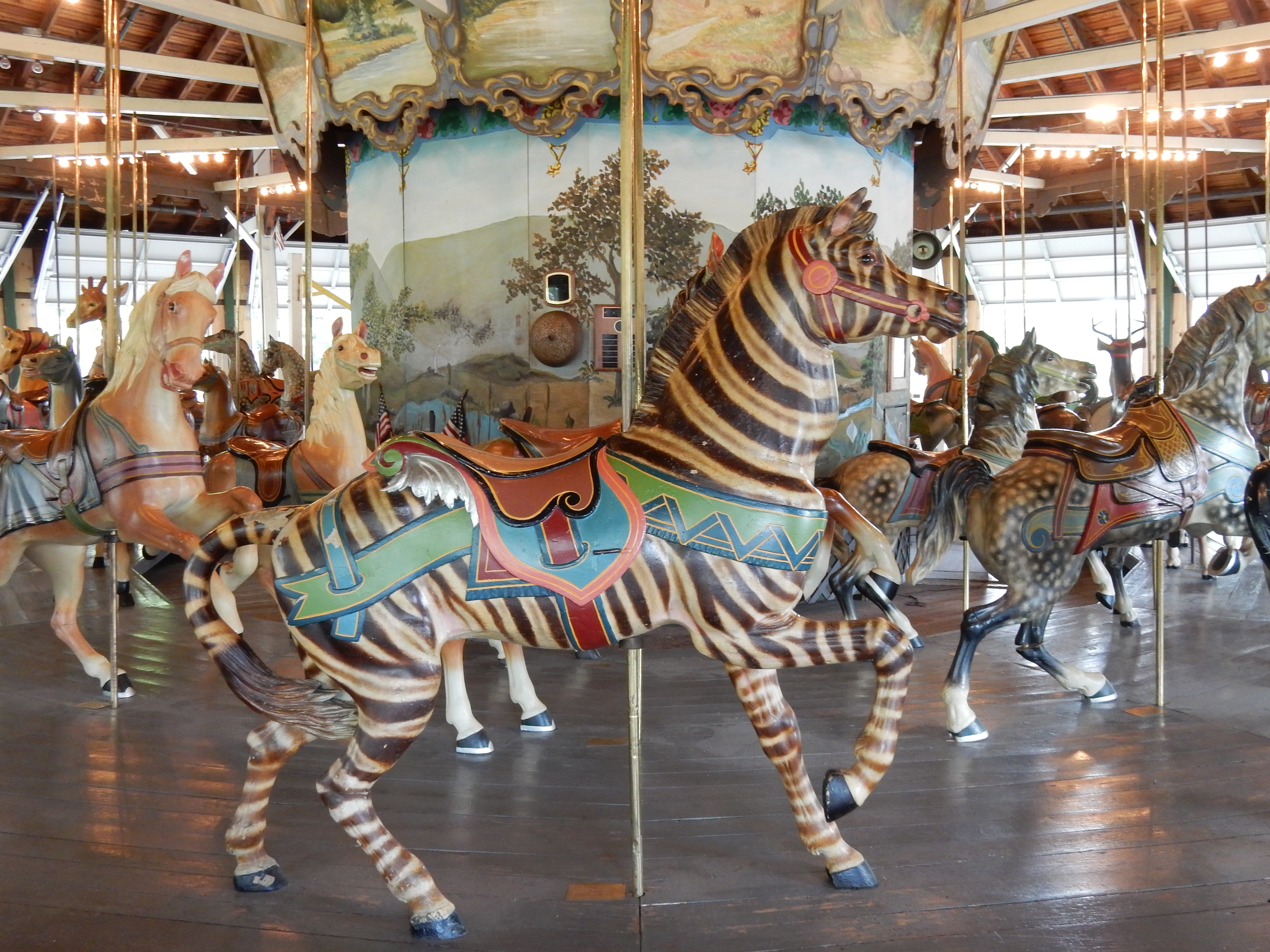
Zebra at Weona Park Carousel

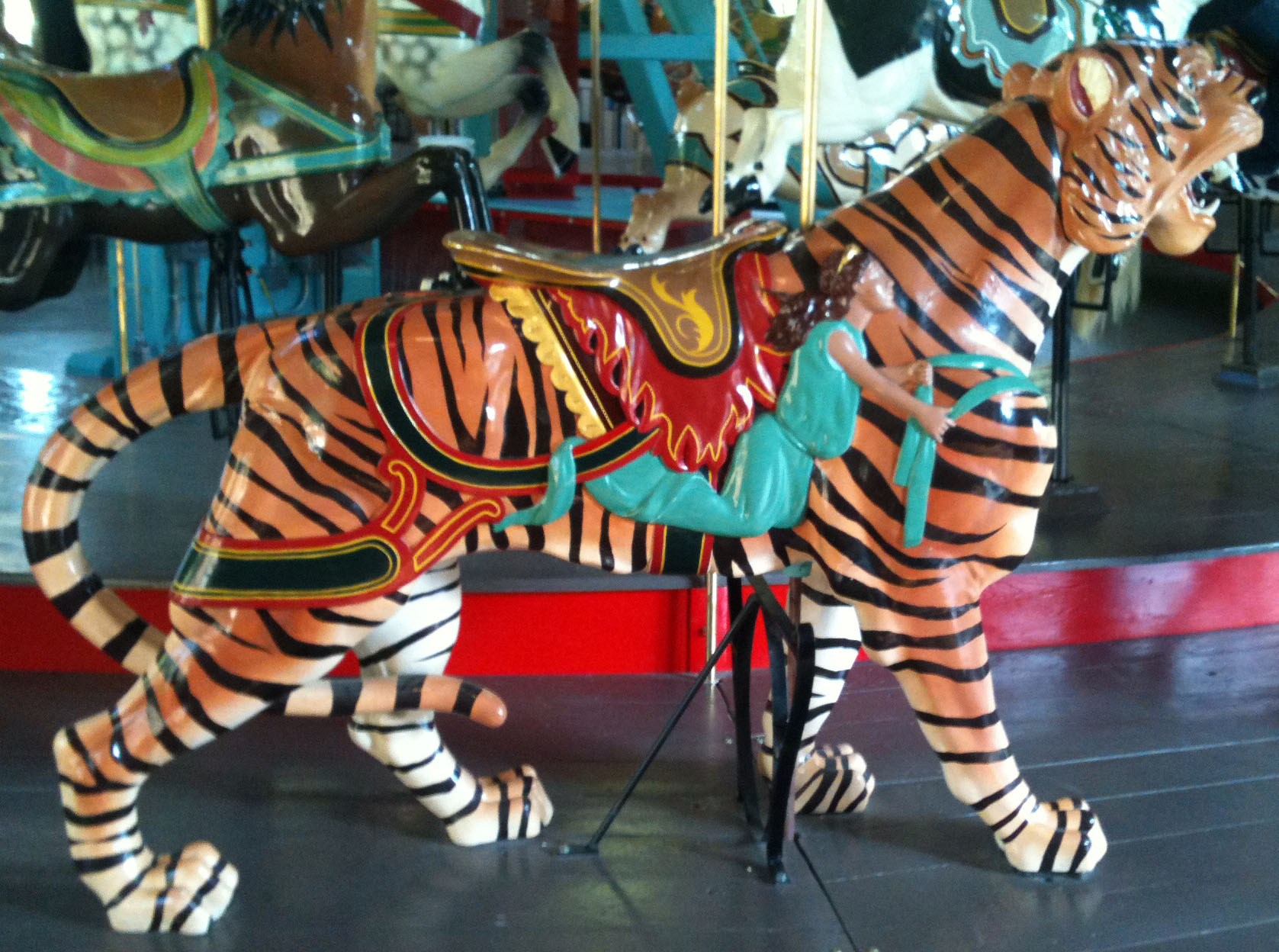
Tiger at the Pullen Park Carousel

== Bibliography ==
- Hinds, Anne Dion (1990). Grab the Brass Ring: the American Carousel (1st ed.). Crown Publishers, Inc. ISBN 0-517-57486-1.
