= Midway Carousel =

Restored antique carousel in Cedar Point

- Daniel C. Muller Carousel
- U.S. National Register of Historic Places
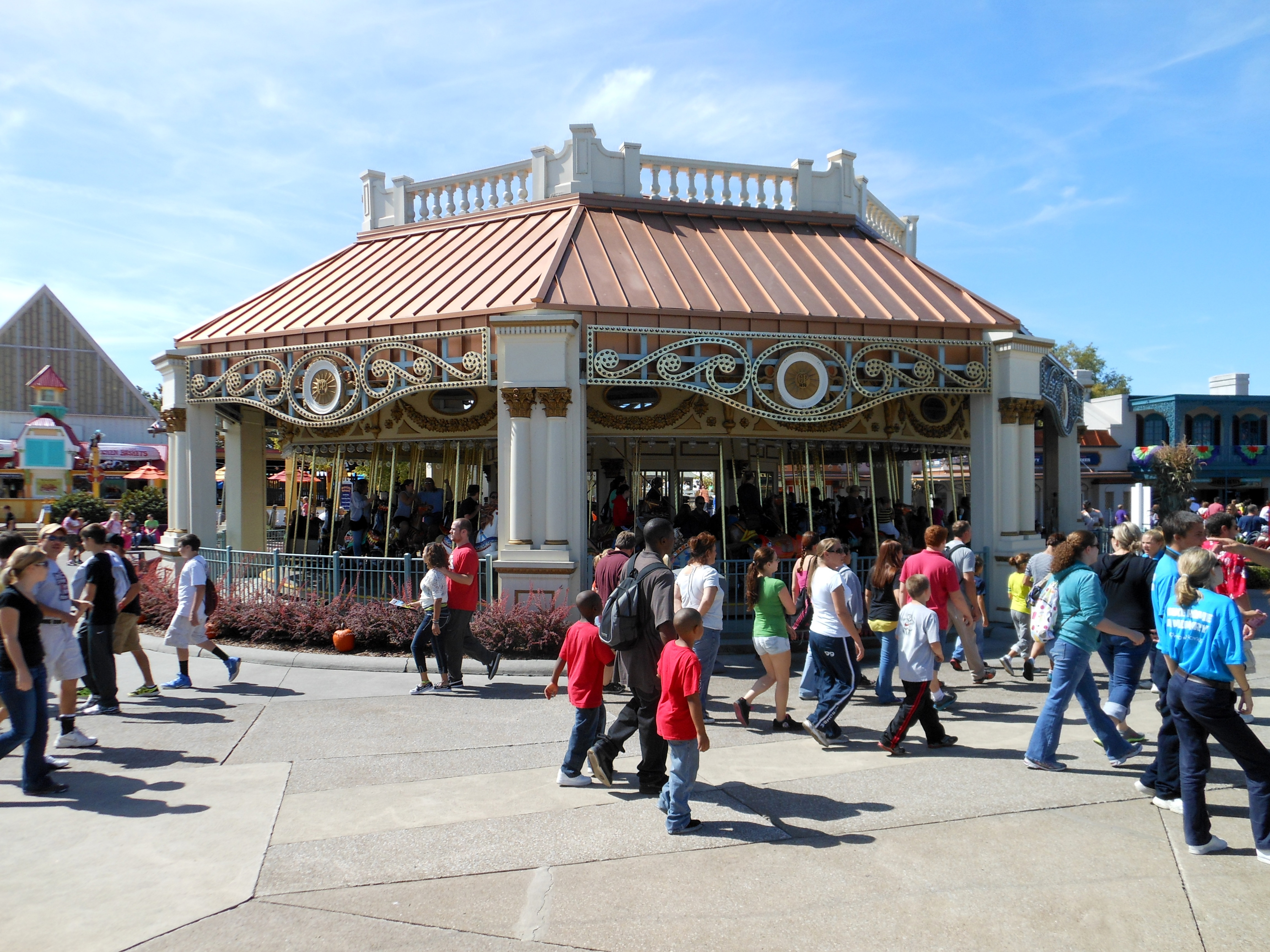
- Location: Sandusky, Ohio
- Coordinates: 41.4788°N 82.6796°W
- Built: 1912
- NRHP reference No.: 82001426
- Added to NRHP: October 20, 1982

The Midway Carousel (also known as the Daniel C. Müller Carousel) is an antique carousel in Cedar Point in Sandusky, Ohio. It was built in 1912 and was added to the National Register of Historic Places in 1982. The carousel is Cedar Point's oldest operating ride.

== Overview ==
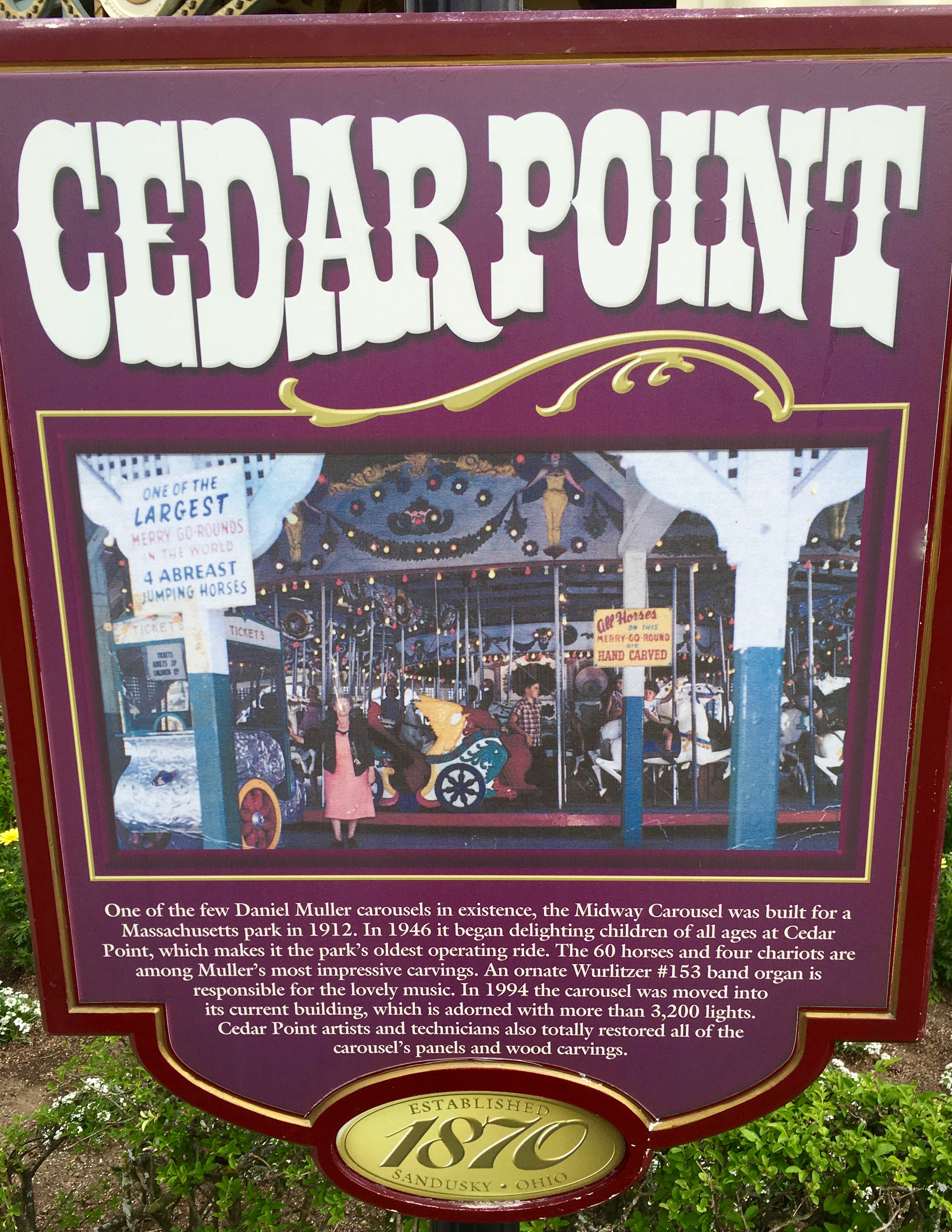
The carousel's historical marker

The carousel is 57.5 feet (17.5 m) in diameter and features 60 horses arranged in 16 rows of three or four. The inside three horses are jumpers, meaning they are attached to a mechanism that moves them up and down as the carousel moves. The outside row horses are stationary. Four of the rows have a chariot in place of the outside horse for a total of 48 jumpers, 12 standing horses and four chariots. Music is provided by a Wurlitzer 153 band organ.

== History ==
The carousel was created by Daniel C. Müller in 1912 for John J. Hurley who operated it as Hurley's Hurdlers in Revere Beach, Massachusetts. In 1945 it was purchased by the Holzapfel family who owned and operated several rides at Cedar Point under the name Playland Amusement Concession Company. The carousel opened on the park's midway for the 1946 season. It is one of only two carousels built independently by Müller that still exist, the other being the Forest Park Carousel in Woodhaven, Queens. Cedar Point purchased the carousel in 1963 from the Holzapfel family. On October 20, 1982, it was listed on the National Register of Historic Places as the Daniel C. Muller Carousel. In September 1993, Cedar Point announced a new inverted roller coaster, Raptor, was to be installed on the main midway where the log flume, carousel and calypso were located. The carousel was carefully disassembled and renovated over the next eight months, with Cedar Point artists and craftsmen carefully restoring the panels and carvings. The original carousel pavilion was not in good condition and was too large for the new location. Some of the artwork was salvaged but the building was demolished. A new carousel building was erected on the main midway at the front of the park. It is adorned with a copper roof and more than 3,200 lights. It originally had red, theatrical-style pulled-back drapes, but those have been removed.

== See also ==
- Amusement rides on the National Register of Historic Places
- Cedar Downs Racing Derby
- Kiddy Kingdom Carousel
- Antique Carousel at Dorney Park
- National Register of Historic Places listings in Sandusky, Ohio
