= Pullen Park Carousel =

- U.S. National Register of Historic Places
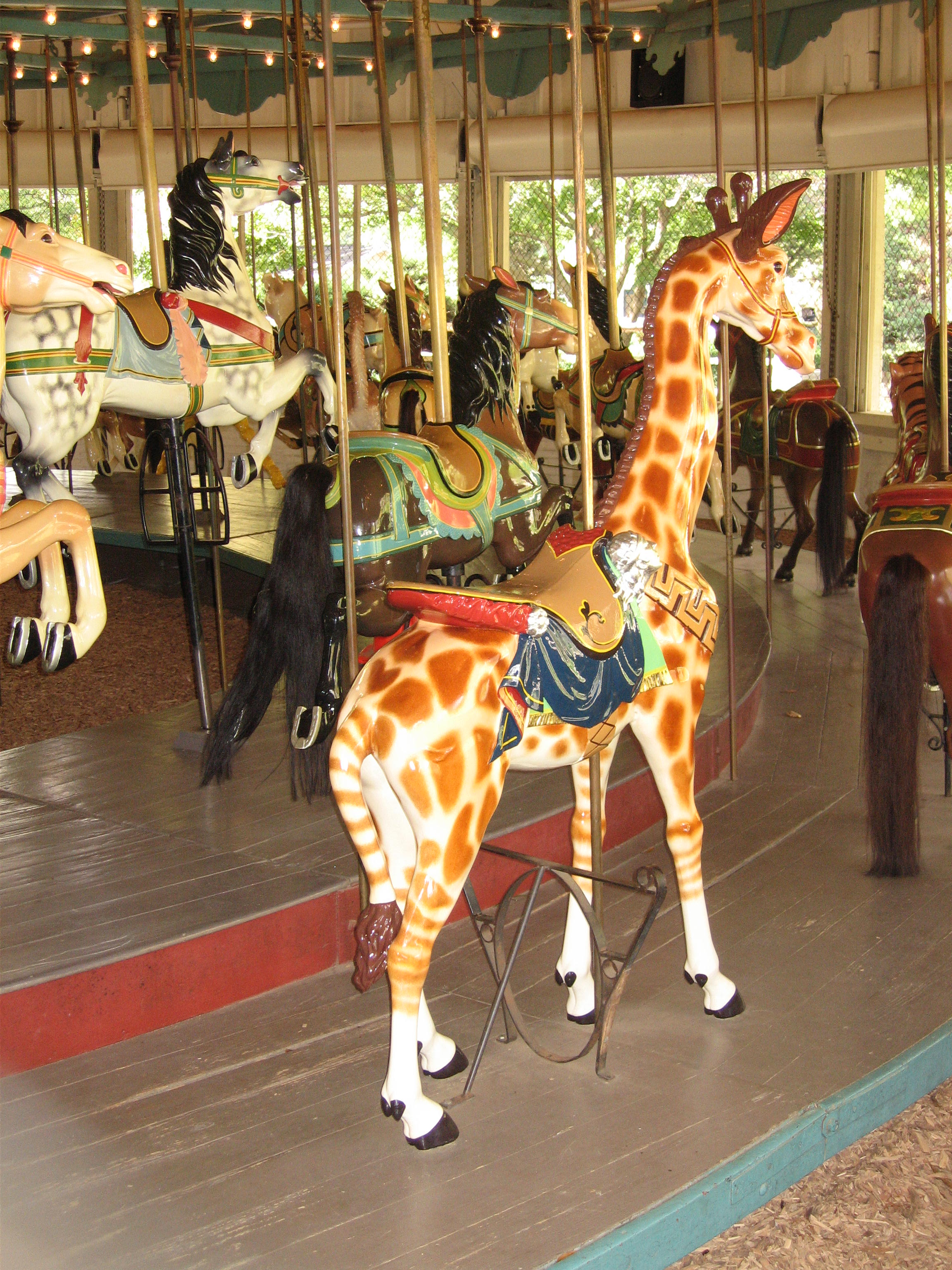

- Location within North Carolina Location within the United States
- Location: Pullen Park, Western Boulevard, Raleigh, North Carolina
- Coordinates: 35°46′47.58″N 78°39′49.76″W
- Area: Less than one acre
- Built: 1900; 126 years ago
- Built by: Dentzel, G.A.; Cernigliaro, Salvatore
- NRHP reference No.: 76001344
- Added to NRHP: September 8, 1976

The Pullen Park Carousel is a classic wood carousel at Pullen Park in Raleigh, North Carolina. Built in 1900, the carousel contains 52 hand-carved basswood animals, 2 chariots (or sleighs), 18 large gilded mirrors and canvas panels and a Wurlitzer #125 band organ made in 1924 by the Rudolph Wurlitzer Company of North Tonawanda, New York.

The carousel underwent restoration from 1977 to 1982 during which time the original factory paint was uncovered, documented and conserved. Each hand-carved animal was restored to its exact Munsell Color System paint color preserving the original paint underneath a layer of shellac while enabling the animals to look just as they were originally painted. In 1976 it was added to the National Register of Historic Places and is a designated Raleigh Historic Landmark.

== History ==
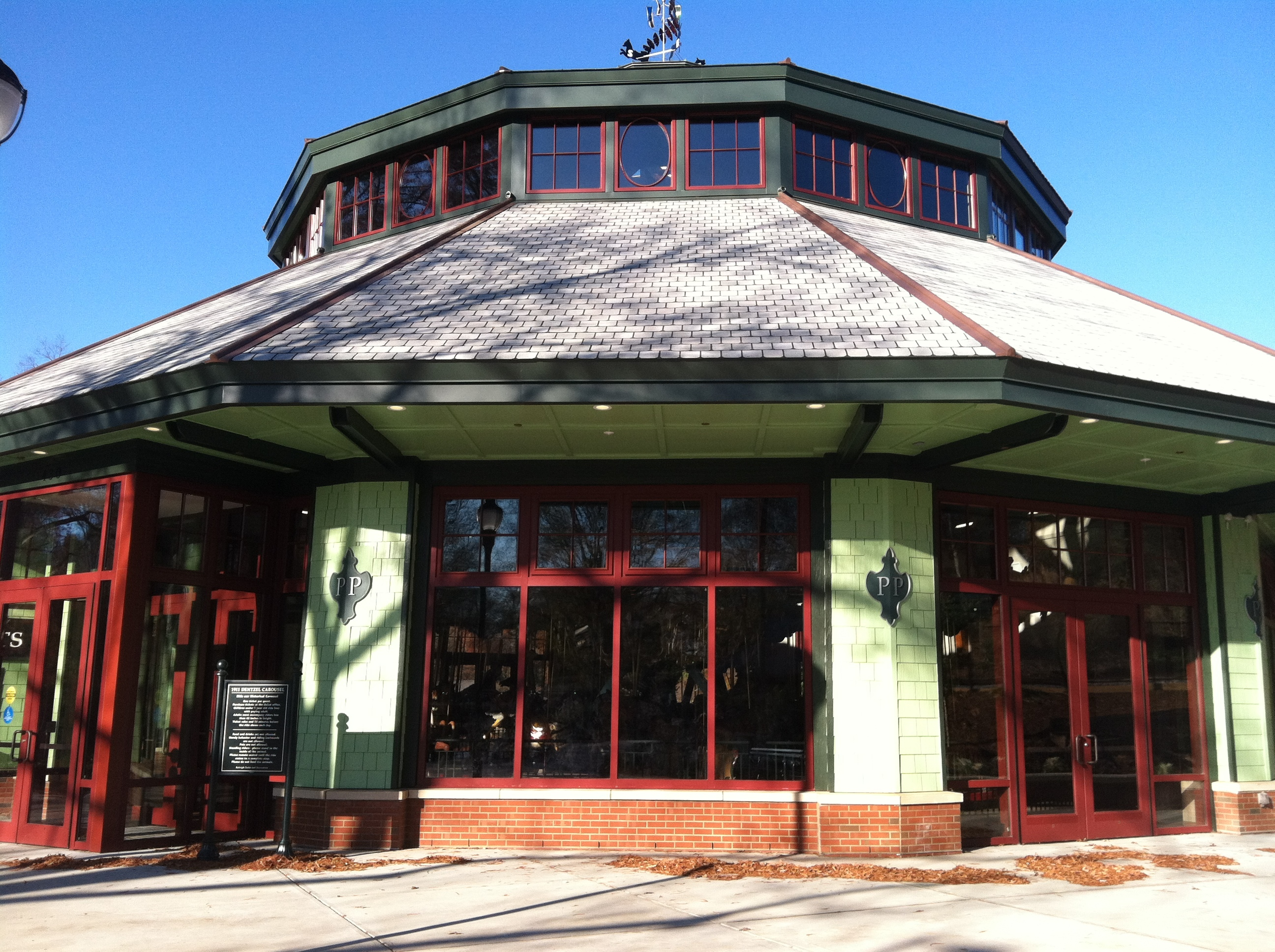
Carousel house after 2011 renovations

In 1887, Richard Stanhope Pullen donated 80 acres (32 ha) of land to the city of Raleigh for use as a public park. The carousel was originally located in Bloomsbury Park (in the area south of Crabtree Creek, west of Lassiter's Mill Road, and north of Scotland Street) and was moved to Pullen Park in 1921 when the City Board voted to replace the steam powered antique merry go round. Bloomsbury Park, an amusement park founded by Carolina Power & Light (CP&L), was apparently in financial trouble and Pullen Park was able to acquire the carousel for $1,425 — one tenth of its original cost. The carousel became a Pullen Park focal point and is now recognized as one of the foremost surviving works of the Pennsylvania Carousel Company, founded by Gustav Dentzel.

In 1860, Dentzel emigrated from Germany and set up a cabinet making shop in Philadelphia, Pennsylvania. After the public's positive reaction to a merry go round he had built, Dentzel began constructing carousels full-time in 1876. From then until the closing of his factory in 1928, the company was the premier maker of carousels in the United States. The Pullen Park Carousel is one of 23 remaining historic Dentzel carousels still operating in North America.

The primary feature of the Pullen Park Carousel is a menagerie of 52 hand-carved wooden animals carved by Salvatore Cernigliaro who was known for elaborate and imaginative designs. The animals include horses, ostriches, cats, rabbits, pigs, a giraffe, a lion, a tiger, a reindeer, and a goat. The carousel is housed in a tent-like wooden-beamed shelter. The original music was produced by a Wurlitzer band organ. Since coming to Pullen Park, the carousel has been in almost continuous use. Replacements of several mechanical components have been made due to wear and tear, but the ride remains largely intact.

== See also ==
- Amusement rides on the National Register of Historic Places
- National Register of Historic Places listings in Wake County, North Carolina
