= Highland Park (Meridian, Mississippi) =

- U.S. National Register of Historic Places
- U.S. Historic district
- Mississippi Landmark
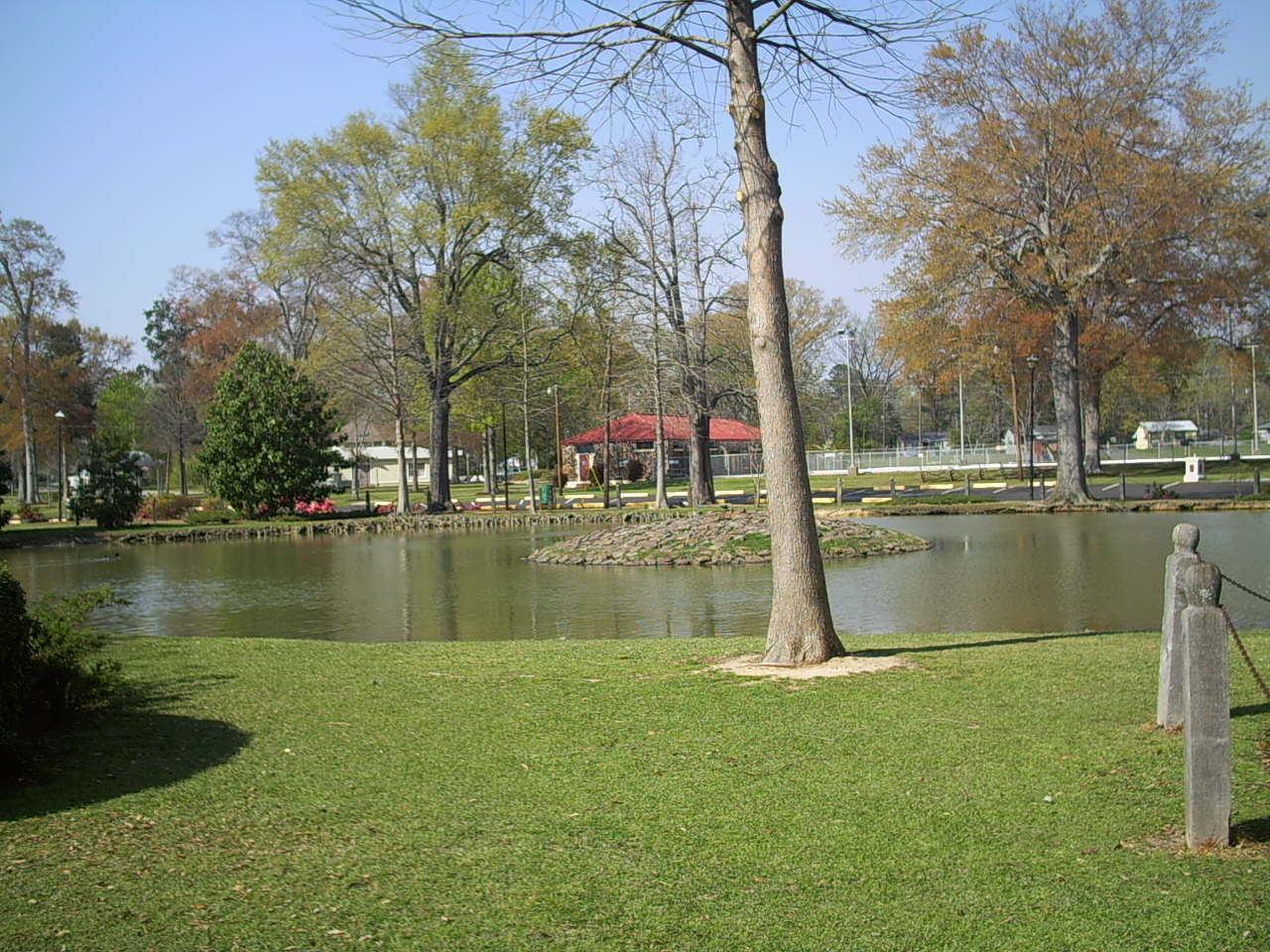
- Lagoon in Highland Park

- Location within Mississippi Location within the United States
- Location: Meridian, Mississippi
- Coordinates: 32°22′30.8″N 88°43′5.9″W
- Area: 32 acres (13 ha)
- Built: 1909
- Architect: Adolph R. Arp
- NRHP reference No.: 79001325
- USMS No.: 075-MER-0960-NR-ML

Significant dates
- Added to NRHP: February 28, 1979
- Designated USMS: August 1, 1984

Highland Park is a historic park in Meridian, Mississippi, United States. Home to a museum honoring Jimmie Rodgers, a Meridian native, the site was listed on the National Register of Historic Places in 1979. The park is also home to the Highland Park Dentzel Carousel and Shelter Building, a National Historic Landmark manufactured around 1896 by Gustav Dentzel of Philadelphia, Pennsylvania. The historic carousel is the only two-row stationary Dentzel menagerie still in existence.

== History ==
The history of Highland Park begins in the late 19th century when the area was used as the Meridian Fair and Livestock Exposition. The organization, which was influenced by World's fairs such as the 1893 Chicago World's Fair and Atlanta's International Cotton Exposition in 1895, was founded in 1904 by big names in Meridian such as Israel Marks, the Threefoot brothers, and the Rothenbergs. They acquired land in west Meridian but never made any plans of what to do with it. When the Fair and Exposition Corporation dissolved in 1906, ownership of the land was transferred to a non-profit trust. After a city Park Association was formed in 1908, the association was tasked with assembling property and developing initial plans for the park.

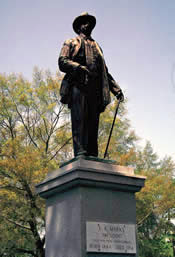
Israel A Marks (1913), by Allen George Newman

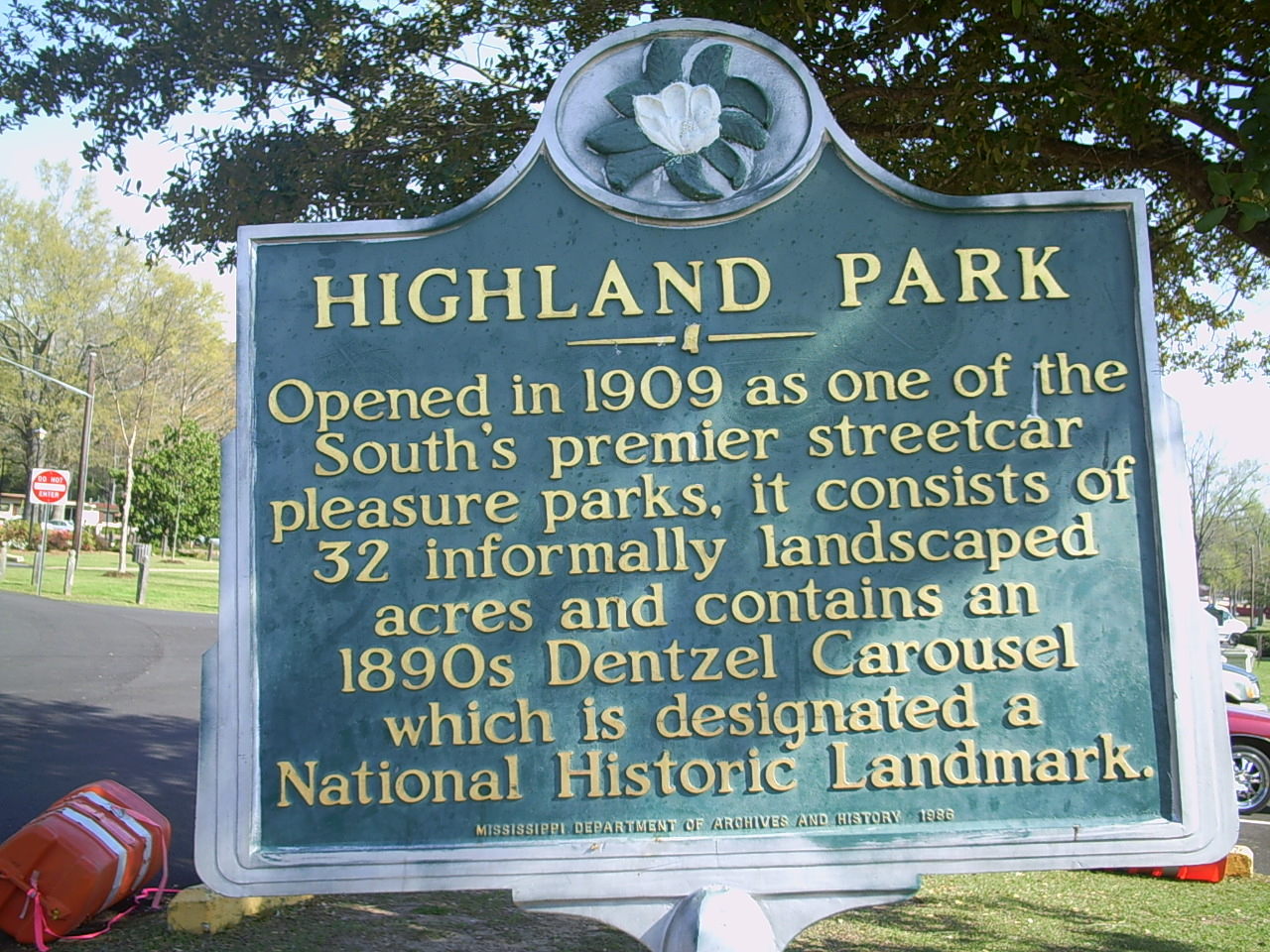
Historic Park sign

At the time Highland Park was designed, there was a national trend for streetcar pleasure parks, and electric railway companies wanted to increase their operations by owning or investing in these parks. The Meridian Light and Railway Company followed the national trend, building a rail line beginning at 8th Street and following 34th Avenue until it turned west between 19th and 20th Streets and continuing west into Highland Park. The platform for the streetcar line was located in the northeast corner of the park at the main entrance. A promenade connected the platform with a small pool, a carousel house, a large loveseat, a bronze statue honoring Israel Marks, and a gazebo. A sidewalk extended from the promenade to a dance pavilion, and another sidewalk connected the gazebo with a bandstand. South of this group was a lagoon, alligator pond, footbridge, and greenhouse. In the western section of the park, there were two picnic shelters, a small toilet facility, and a terraced amphitheater. The northern part of the park was originally meant for pedestrians while the southern part was reserved for those with horses.

A downtown monument honoring Frank M. Zehler, a fireman who died on duty in 1901, was relocated to the park in the 1920s from its original location at the intersection of 23rd Avenue and 4th Street in downtown Meridian. In the 1930s, two swimming pools were built on the site of the former dance pavilion, a one-story commercial building was added in the northwest corner of the park, and an arboretum was added by the amphitheater. The pathways in the park were paved in the 1940s, allowing vehicles to travel through the area. A small fighter jet was located in the park between the pools and the promenade in 1972. Also, a Parks and Recreation office, a museum honoring Jimmie Rodgers, a steam locomotive and caboose, children's playground equipment, and the Frank Cochran Center have been added since. Of the original features, all remain except the dance pavilion and greenhouse.

== Dentzel carousel ==
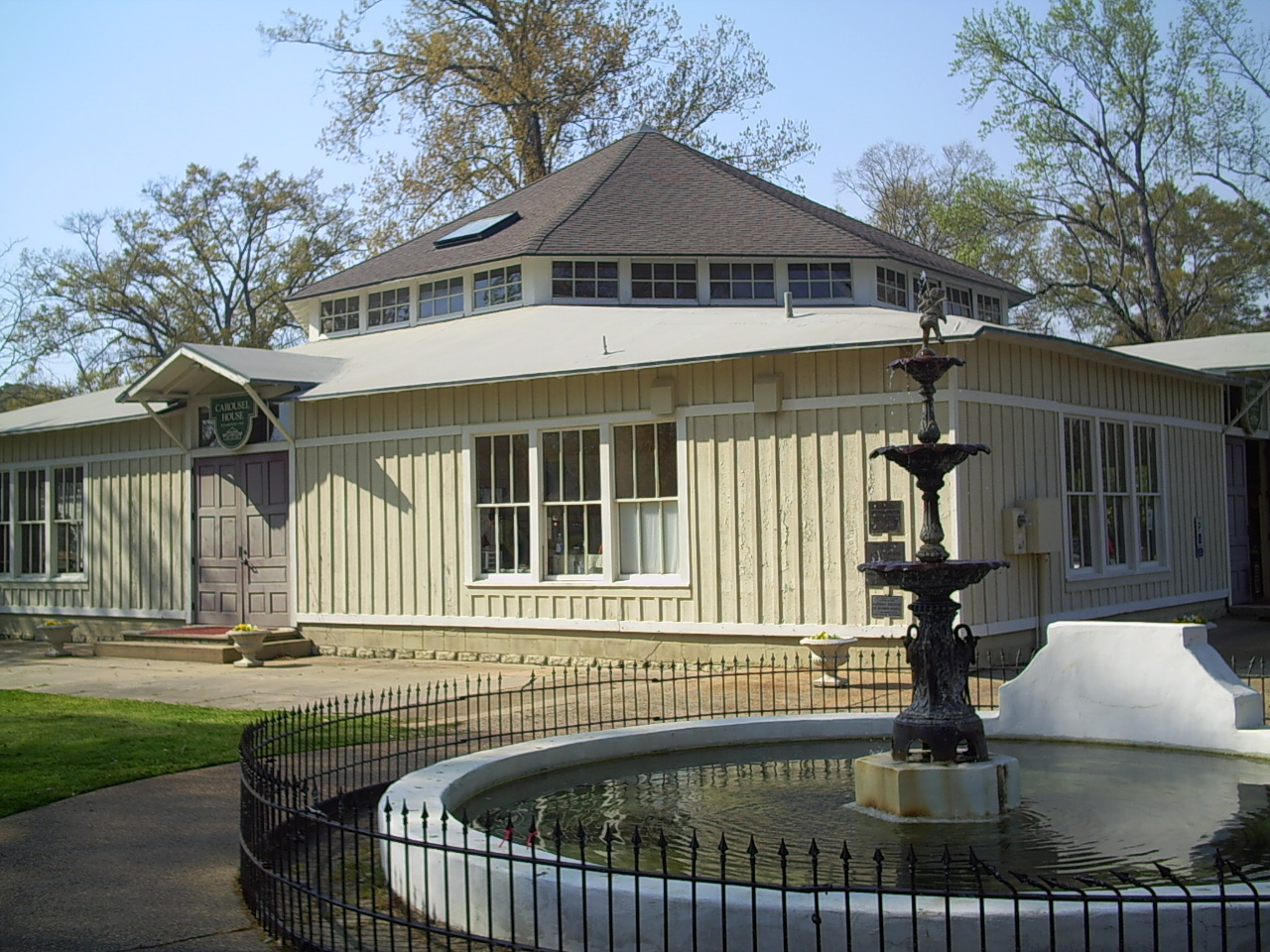
Historic Dentzel Carousel

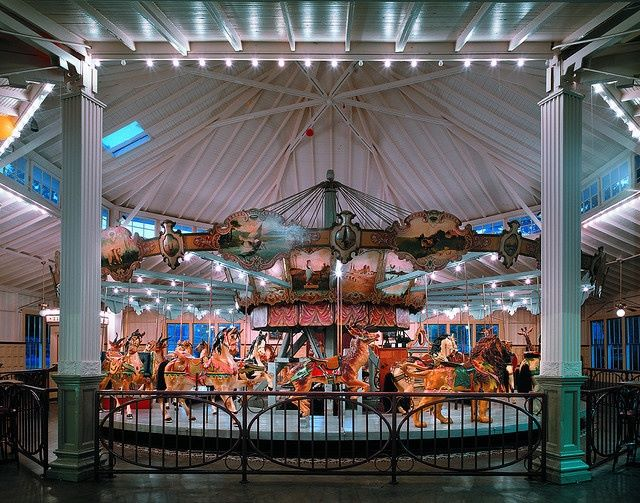
Highland Park Dentzel Carousel

The Highland Park Dentzel Carousel and Shelter Building was manufactured about 1896 for the 1904 St. Louis Exposition by Gustav Dentzel of Philadelphia, Pennsylvania. Meridian bought the carousel in 1909 and installed it in its house in the park. It is the only remaining two-row stationary Dentzel menagerie in the world. As such, it was declared a National Historic Landmark in 1987. Its house, also in the National Historic Landmark listing, is the only remaining original carousel building built from a Dentzel blueprint.

While the carousel building was closed from 1983 to 1984 for major restoration, the carousel animals were removed and placed in various local institutions while funds were raised. From 1984 to 1995, the animals, chariots, and canvas oil paintings of the carousel were restored to their original appearance. The restoration was done by Rosa Ragan of Raleigh, North Carolina, one of the foremost restoration specialists in the country.

== Jimmie Rodgers museum ==
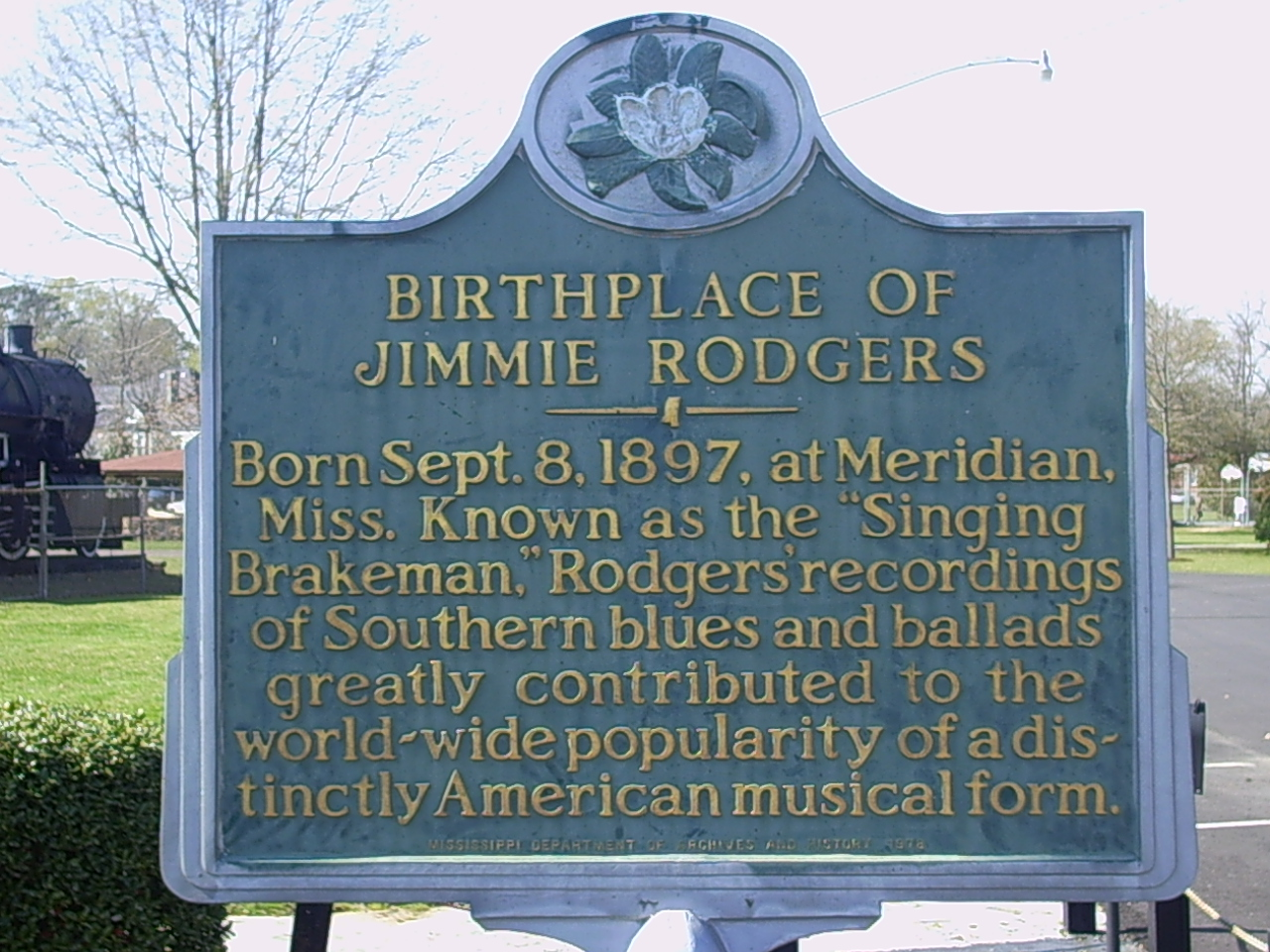
Jimmie Rodgers Museum sign

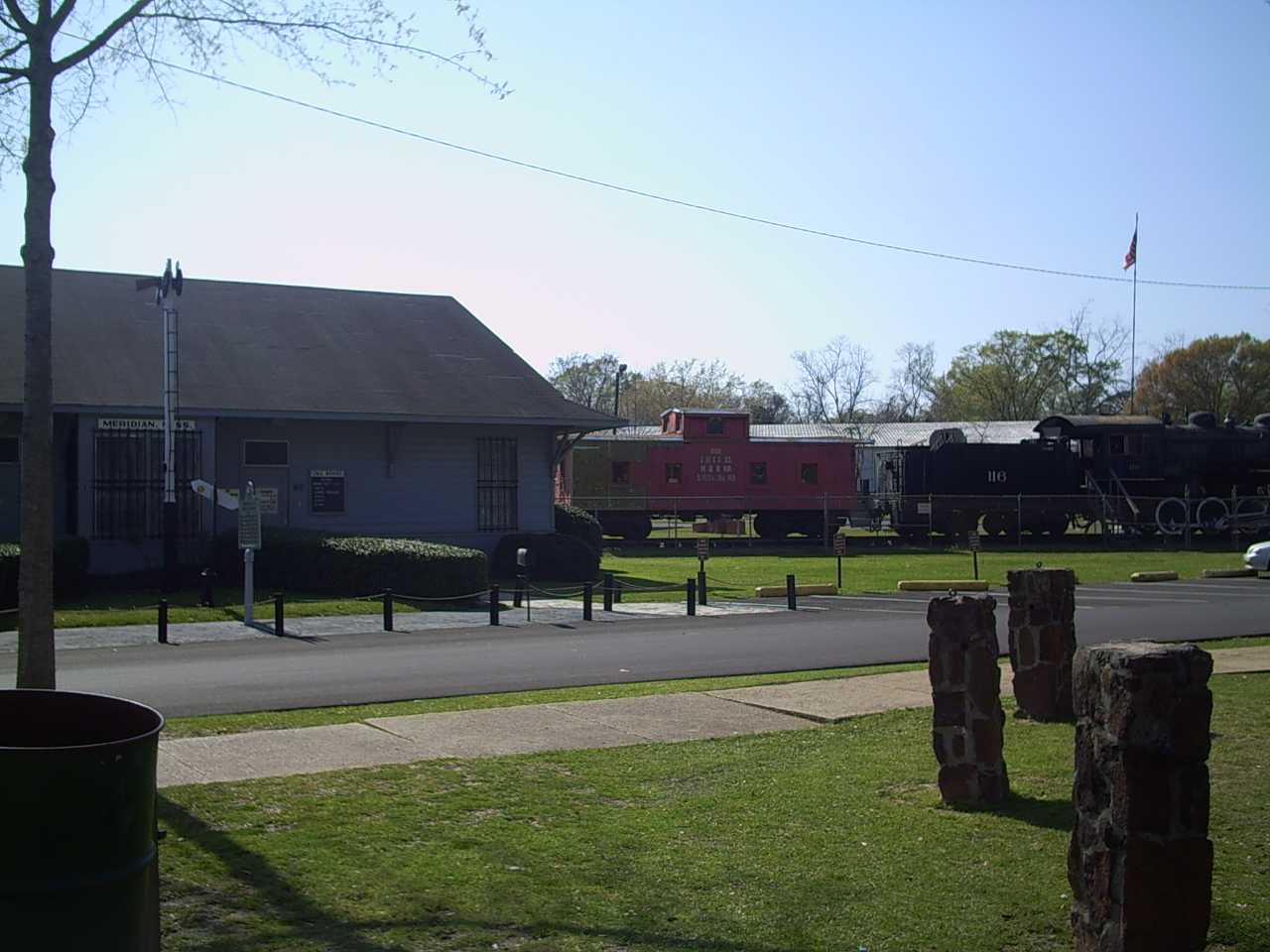
Jimmie Rodgers Museum

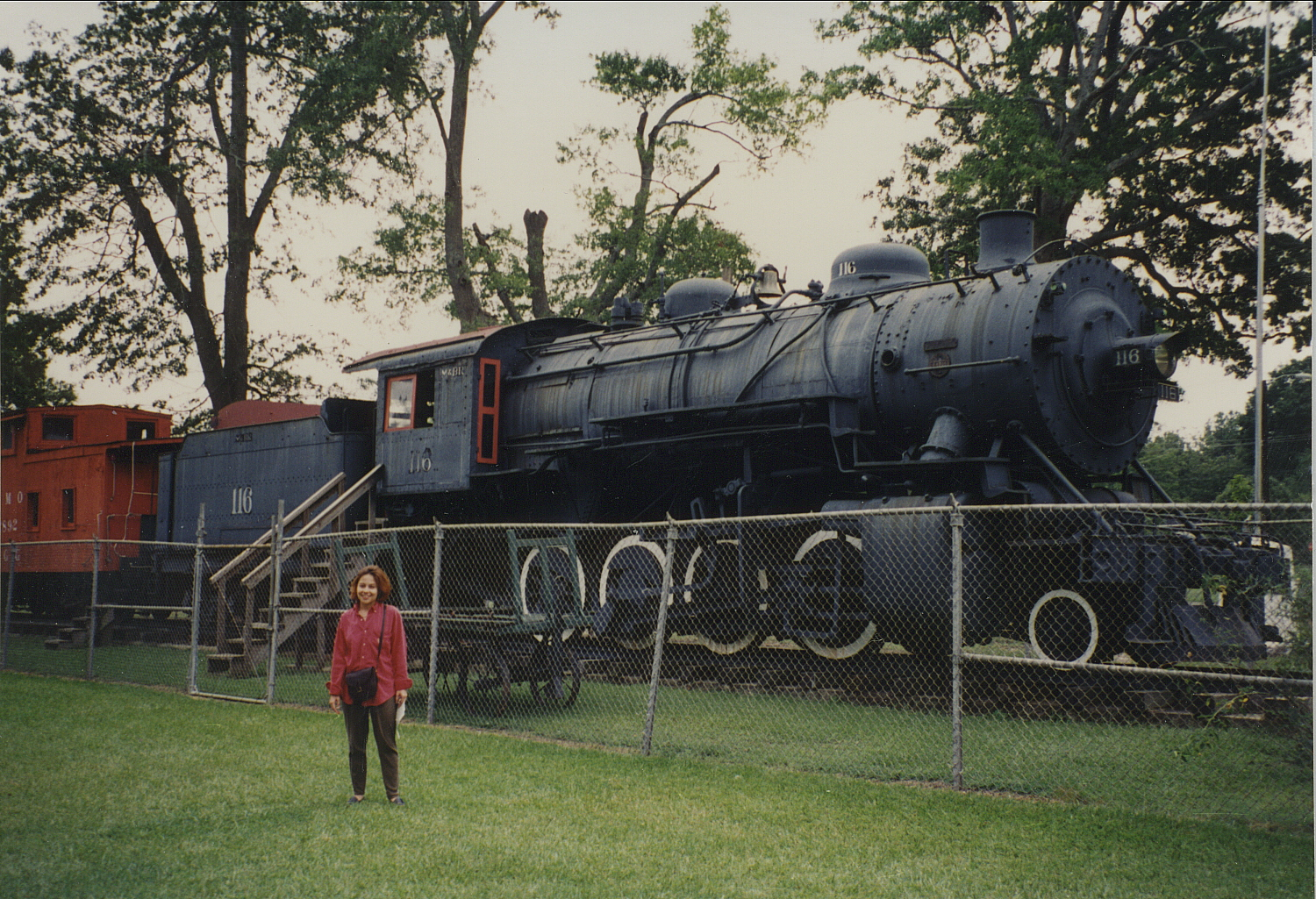
Locomotive outside museum

The park houses a Jimmie Rodgers museum honoring the Meridian-born country legend and displaying the original guitar of the so-called "Singing Brakeman," along with other memorabilia of his life and career and various railroading equipment from the steam engine era – Meridian's "golden age". In addition to the museum building itself, which was built in 1976, outside memorials honor the country star, and a vintage steam locomotive is displayed on a small section of railroad track, symbolizing Meridian's strong ties to railroading history. The locomotive is a 1917 Baldwin steam locomotive from the Susquehanna and New York Railroad line. It was later used by the Meridian and Bigbee railroad, who donated it to the city in 1953 as a memorial to all deceased railroaders. The locomotive was moved to the park in 1970.

== Arts in the Park ==
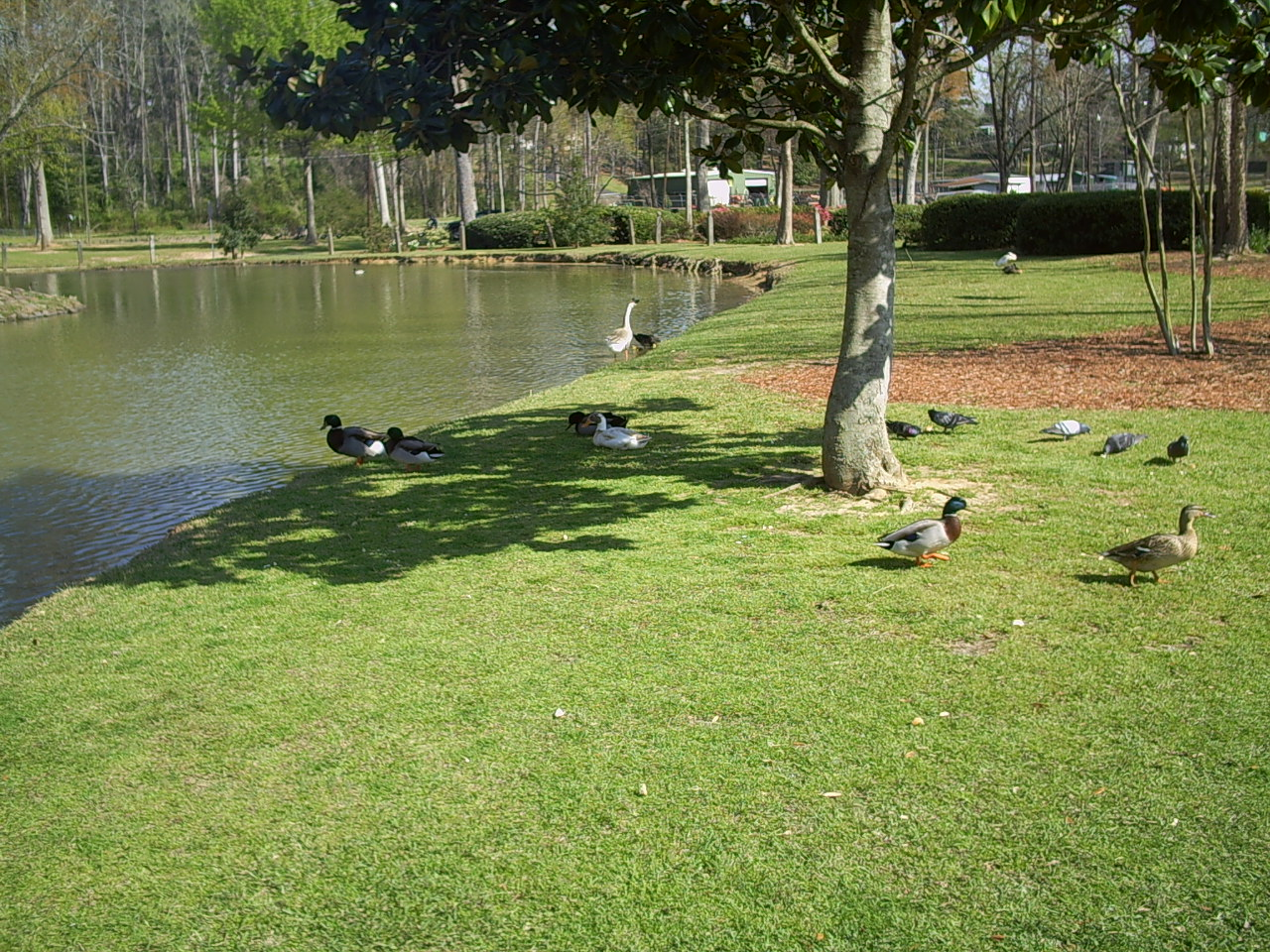
Ducks in the park

The park hosted the annual Arts in the Park festival from the festival's premiere in 1971 until 2006, when the Meridian Council of Arts decided to move the festival to Bonita Lakes, another location in Meridian. In 2009 the festival was combined with the Threefoot Arts Festival and moved to downtown Meridian to form the Threefoot Festival.

Arts in the Park, held on the first Saturday in April, provides a multi-discipline venue for artists, craftsmen, musicians and performers. Local dance groups, martial arts groups, drama groups, gospel-drama groups, gospel praise dance teams, singers, bands and choral groups perform their art for crowds of people on two separate entertainment stages. The festival features a juried art competition and show as well as a non-competition craft area. Arts in the Park acts as a revenue source for non-profit groups as well as a showcase for the Arts. In general the non-profit groups that take part in Arts in the Park are art organizations, local churches, and various community wide charitable organizations.

== See also ==
- List of music museums
