= Kiddy Kingdom Carousel =

Restored antique carousel in Cedar Point

- William H. Dentzel 1924 Carousel
- U.S. National Register of Historic Places
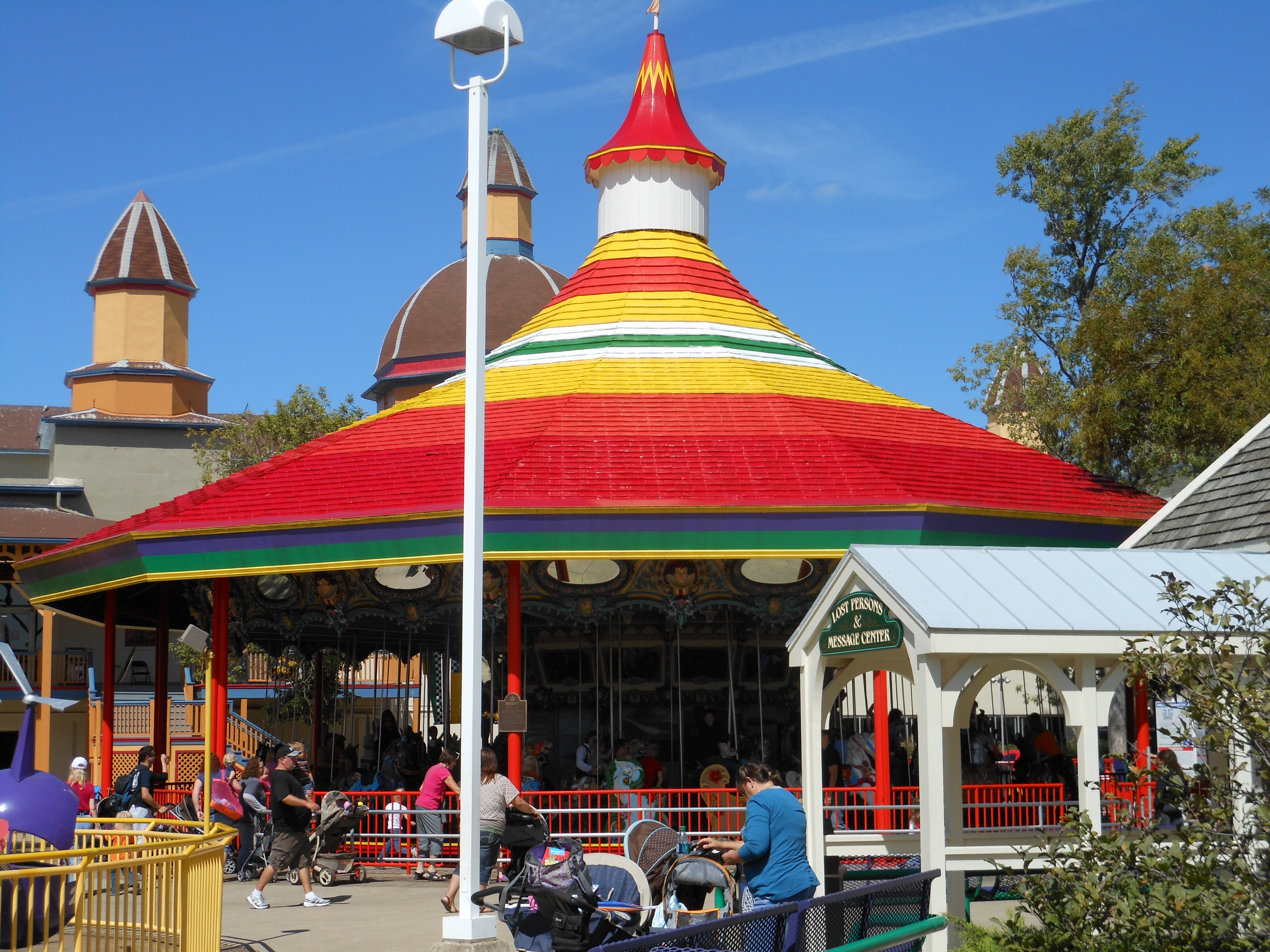
- Location: Sandusky, Ohio
- Coordinates: 41.4809°N 82.6809°W
- Built: 1924
- NRHP reference No.: 90000625
- Added to NRHP: November 8, 1990

The Kiddy Kingdom Carousel (also known as the William H. Dentzel 1924 Carousel) is an antique carousel in Cedar Point in Sandusky, Ohio. It was built in 1924 and was added to the National Register of Historic Places in 1990. It is regarded as William Dentzel's masterpiece.

== Overview ==
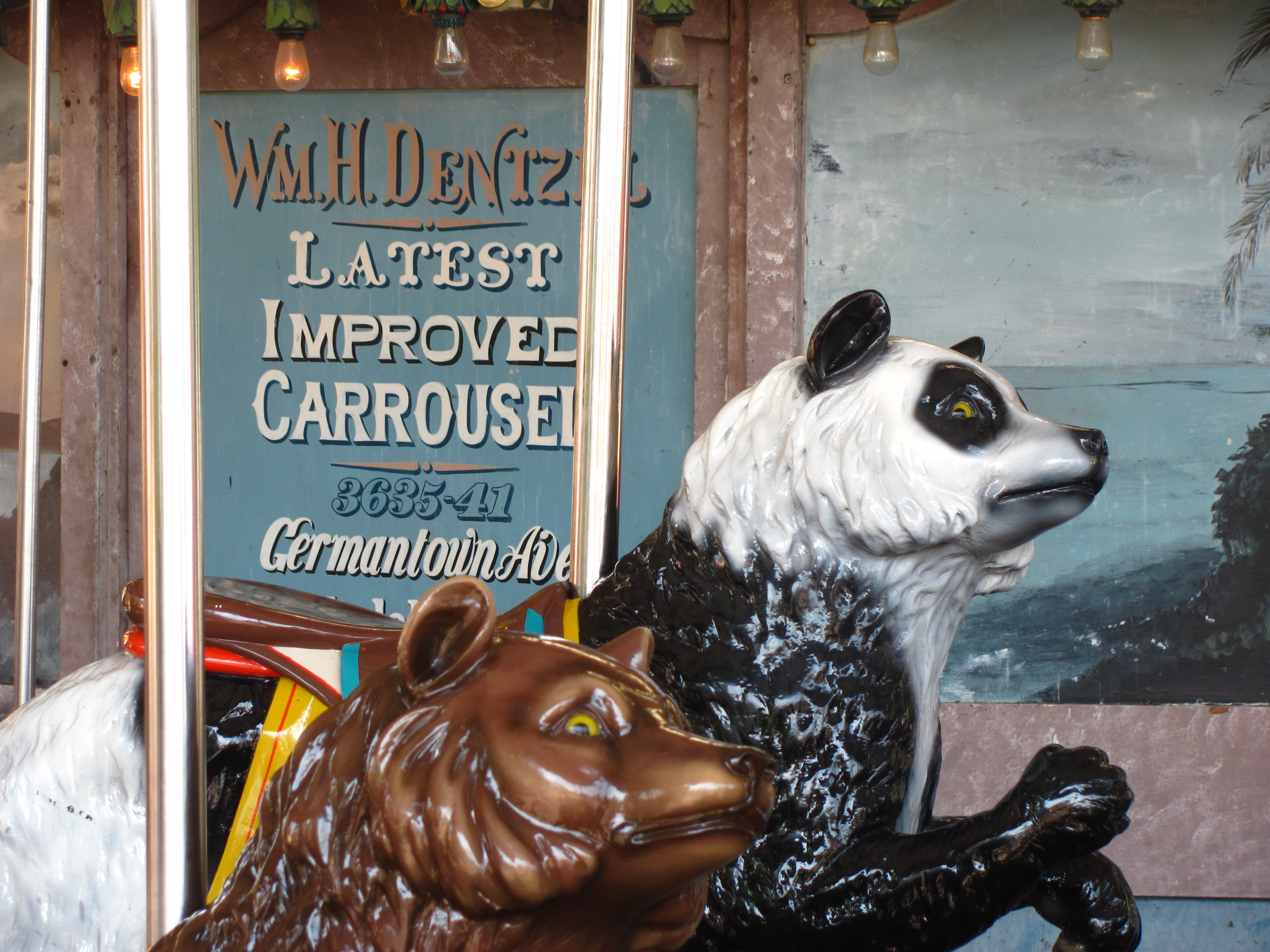
Bear figures on the carousel

The carousel contains two chariots and a menagerie of 52 animal figures (36 jumping and 16 stationary) consisting of horses, rabbits, ostriches, and bears, as well as a single tiger, lion, and donkey, arranged three abreast on its 57-foot (17 m) diameter platform. Although a Wurlitzer band organ is present, it hasn't worked in decades. Speakers behind the band organ play pre-recorded music.

== History ==
The carousel was built by the Dentzel Carousel Company, then owned by William Dentzel, the son of company founder Gustav Dentzel, in 1924. It operated in multiple locations, including Hunting Park in Germantown, Philadelphia, the same area where Dentzel's headquarters was located. While the carousel was based in Germantown, Dentzel used it as a showpiece to present to potential clients. In a 1967 interview, Philadelphia Toboggan Company president John C. Allen, whose company bought the Dentzel Carousel Company in 1928, referred to this carousel as William Dentzel's "masterpiece." Cedar Point purchased it in 1968. On November 8, 1990, the carousel was listed on the National Register of Historic Places.

== In popular culture ==
The armored horse from the carousel was selected for inclusion on a set of U.S. postage stamps honoring historic carousel animals as part of the American Folk Art series of stamps. This spectacular carving was created by Daniel C. Müller specifically to commemorate the anniversary of the Dentzel company. As is traditional with many carousels it was designated the "king horse" or "lead horse" to emphasize its unique and decorative nature. Carousel historians consider this particular horse one of the most valuable carousel artifacts in the world. The stamps were issued in 1988 with a first-class 25-cent denomination. The stamps were dedicated the weekend of September 31 to October 2, 1988 at Cedar Point and the old post office in downtown Sandusky. The first sale of the stamps was held at Cedar Point. Owing to its popularity, the armored horse was replaced with a reproduction, and the original was placed in Cedar Point's Town Hall Museum. It is now on display in the lobby of Cedar Point's administrative offices.

== See also ==
- Amusement rides on the National Register of Historic Places
- Cedar Downs Racing Derby
- Midway Carousel
- National Register of Historic Places listings in Sandusky, Ohio
