= Cedar Downs Racing Derby =

Restored antique carousel in Cedar Point

- Great American Racing Derby
- U.S. National Register of Historic Places
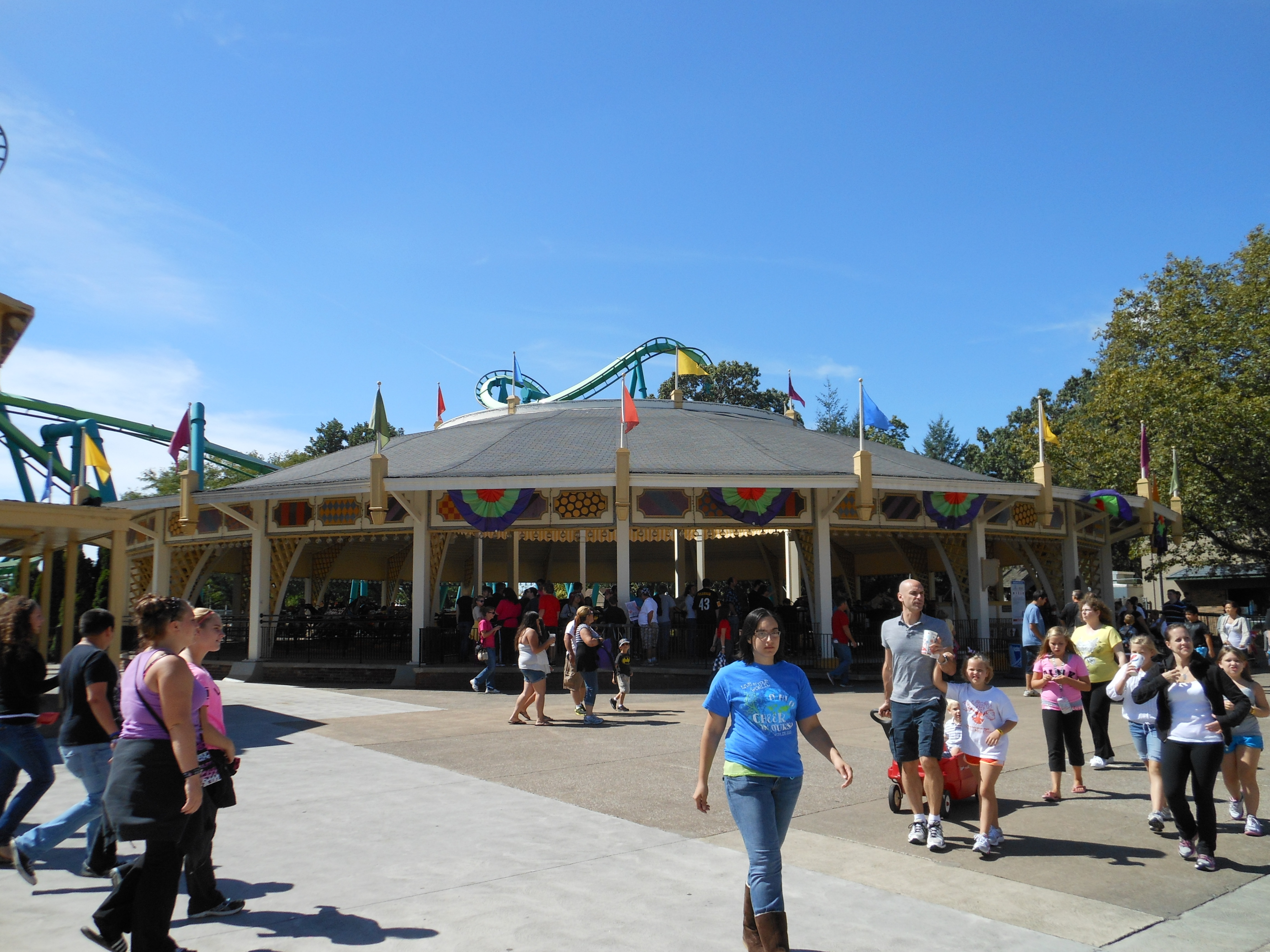
- Location: Sandusky, Ohio
- Coordinates: 41.4806°N 82.6823°W
- Built: 1922
- NRHP reference No.: 90000626
- Added to NRHP: November 8, 1990

The Cedar Downs Racing Derby (previously known as the Great American Racing Derby) is an antique carousel in Cedar Point in Sandusky, Ohio. It was built in 1922 and is one of only two operational racing carousels in the United States.

== Overview ==
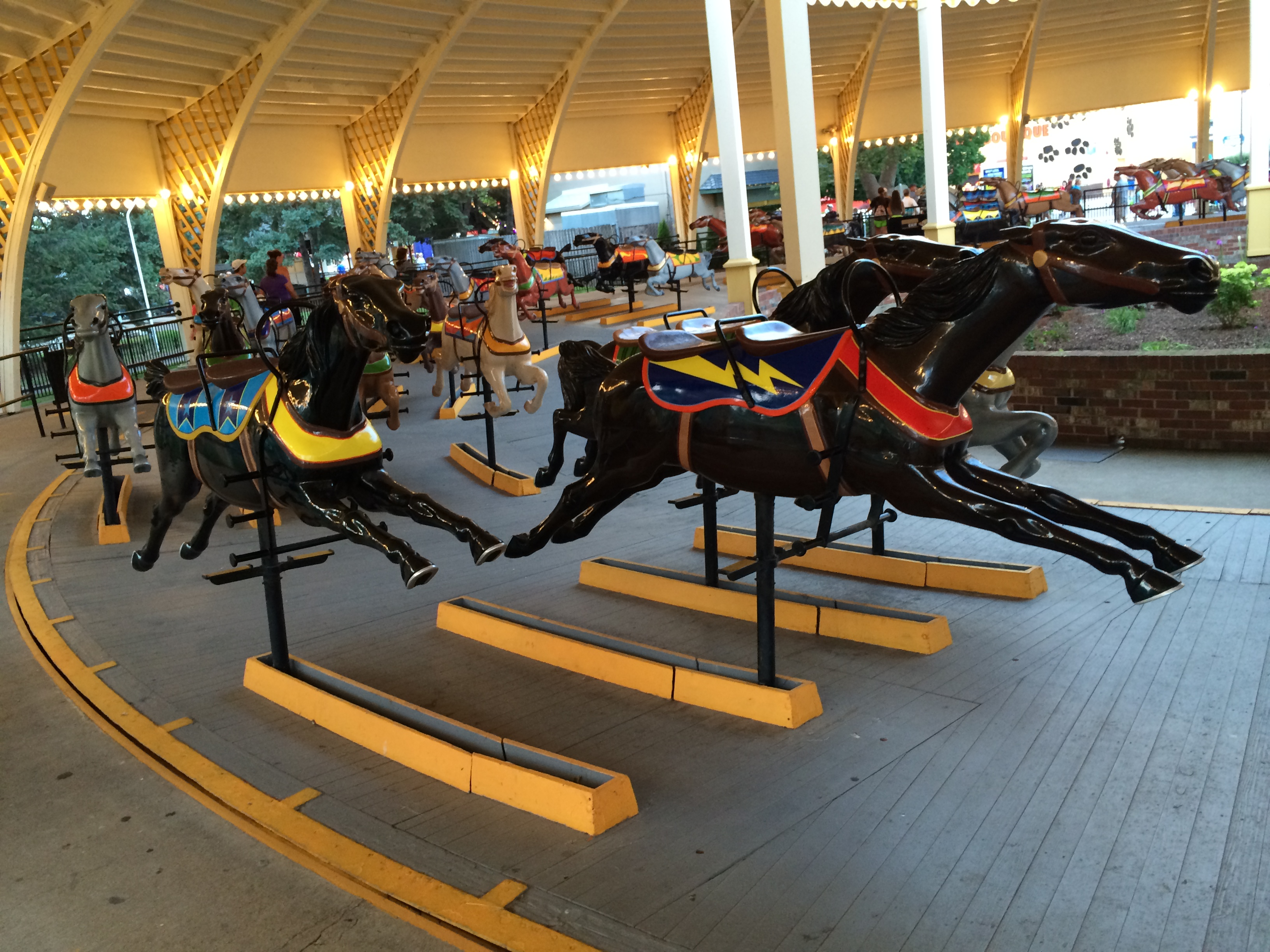
Horse figures on the carousel

The carousel has 64 horse figures that move backward and forward as its 90-foot (27 m) diameter platform spins at a top speed of 15 miles per hour (24 km/h), which creates a horse racing effect. Before the start of each ride cycle a recorded Fanfare trumpet plays "Call to the Post" signaling the start of the race. During the ride a recording of a Race caller can be heard describing the progress of the race.

== History ==
The carousel was built by Prior and Church in 1922 with wooden horses carved by the Williams Amusement Device Company. Prior and Church built at least 18 of these derbies between 1916 and 1927. This particular ride was originally installed in Euclid Beach Park in Cleveland, Ohio, where it was known as the Great American Racing Derby. With 16 rows of four horses, it was one of the largest ever built. (Note: A 72-horse ride with a 100-foot diameter platform was designed but never built.) The original patent illustrated a much smaller platform with six rows of four horses. (Note: Although the original patent was for a 24-horse model, the first one built was a 40-horse derby with a 60-foot platform.) It operated in its original location for 43 years. Euclid Beach Park sold the ride to Cedar Point in 1965 to raise operating capital. The ride opened at Cedar Point in 1967. Euclid Beach Park closed two years later in 1969. The carousel was added to the National Register of Historic Places on November 8, 1990. Although it had been moved to Cedar Point more than 20 years prior, the attraction is listed under its original name from when it operated at Euclid Beach.

== Similar rides ==
A similar, but smaller, 14-row, 56-horse ride known as Derby Racer operates at Rye Playland in Rye, New York. It was one of the last built and has been operating in its original location since 1927. The horses at Rye Playland were carved by Marcus Illions. A third racing carousel, also named Derby Racer, exists at Blackpool Pleasure Beach in Blackpool, England. It is also a 56-horse ride, similar to Rye's, but unlike the originals, it was constructed by Frank Wright in 1959, more than 30 years after the Prior and Church derbies were built. The horses were carved at Blackpool. A 72-key Verbeeck band organ from Antwerp, Belgium, provides music.

== See also ==
- Amusement rides on the National Register of Historic Places
- Kiddy Kingdom Carousel
- Midway Carousel
- National Register of Historic Places listings in Sandusky, Ohio
