= Weona Park Carousel =

- U.S. National Register of Historic Places
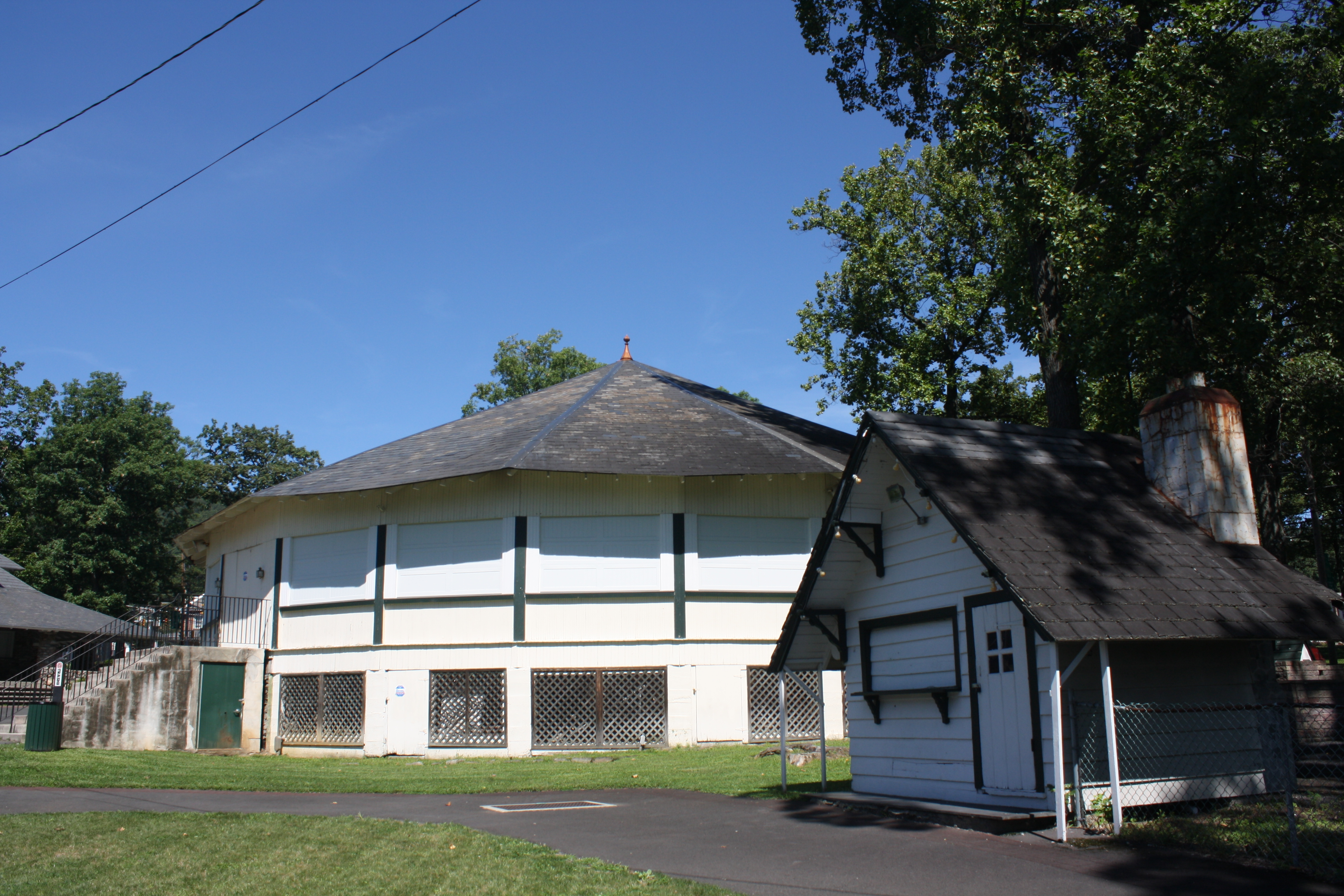
- Weona Park Carousel. August 2013.

- Location within Pennsylvania Location within the United States
- Location: PA 512, Pen Argyl, Pennsylvania
- Coordinates: 40°52′15″N 75°14′55″W
- Area: less than one acre
- Built: 1917
- Built by: Dentzel, William H.; et al.
- Architectural style: stationary menagerie carousel
- NRHP reference No.: 99000879
- Added to NRHP: August 4, 1999

Weona Park Carousel, also known as Dentzel Stationary Menagerie Carousel, is a historic carousel located at Pen Argyl, Northampton County, Pennsylvania. The carousel was built in 1917 and installed in its current location in 1923. The carousel is housed in a wooden, one story, pavilion measuring 20 feet high at center and 80 feet in diameter, with 24 sections each 10 feet 6 inches wide. The carousel has 44 animals and 2 sleighs standing three abreast. They were originally hand carved and painted in the 1890s, c. 1905, and c. 1917. It was constructed by the Dentzel Carousel Company of Philadelphia, Pennsylvania.

It was added to the National Register of Historic Places in 1999.

== Gallery ==
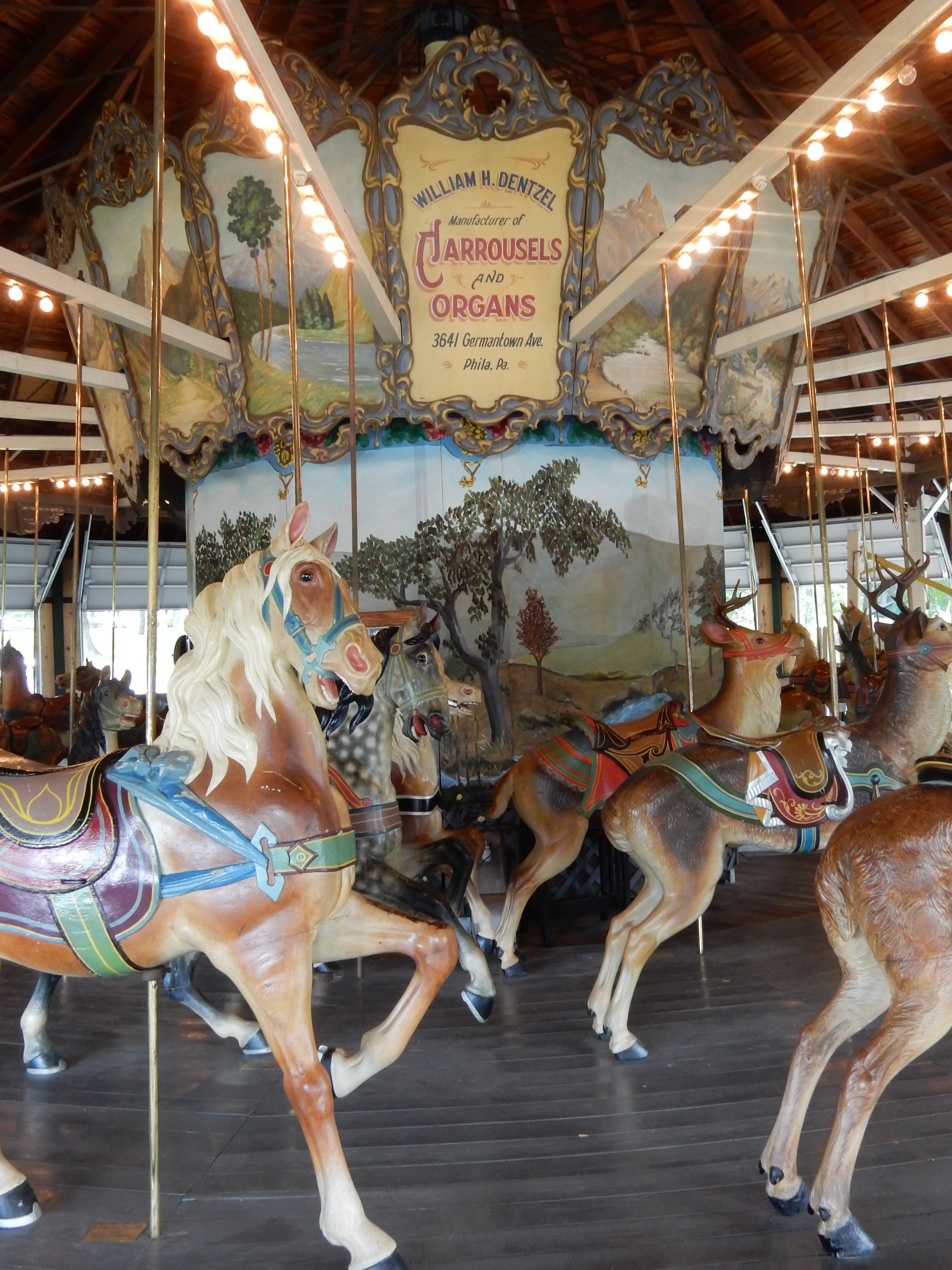

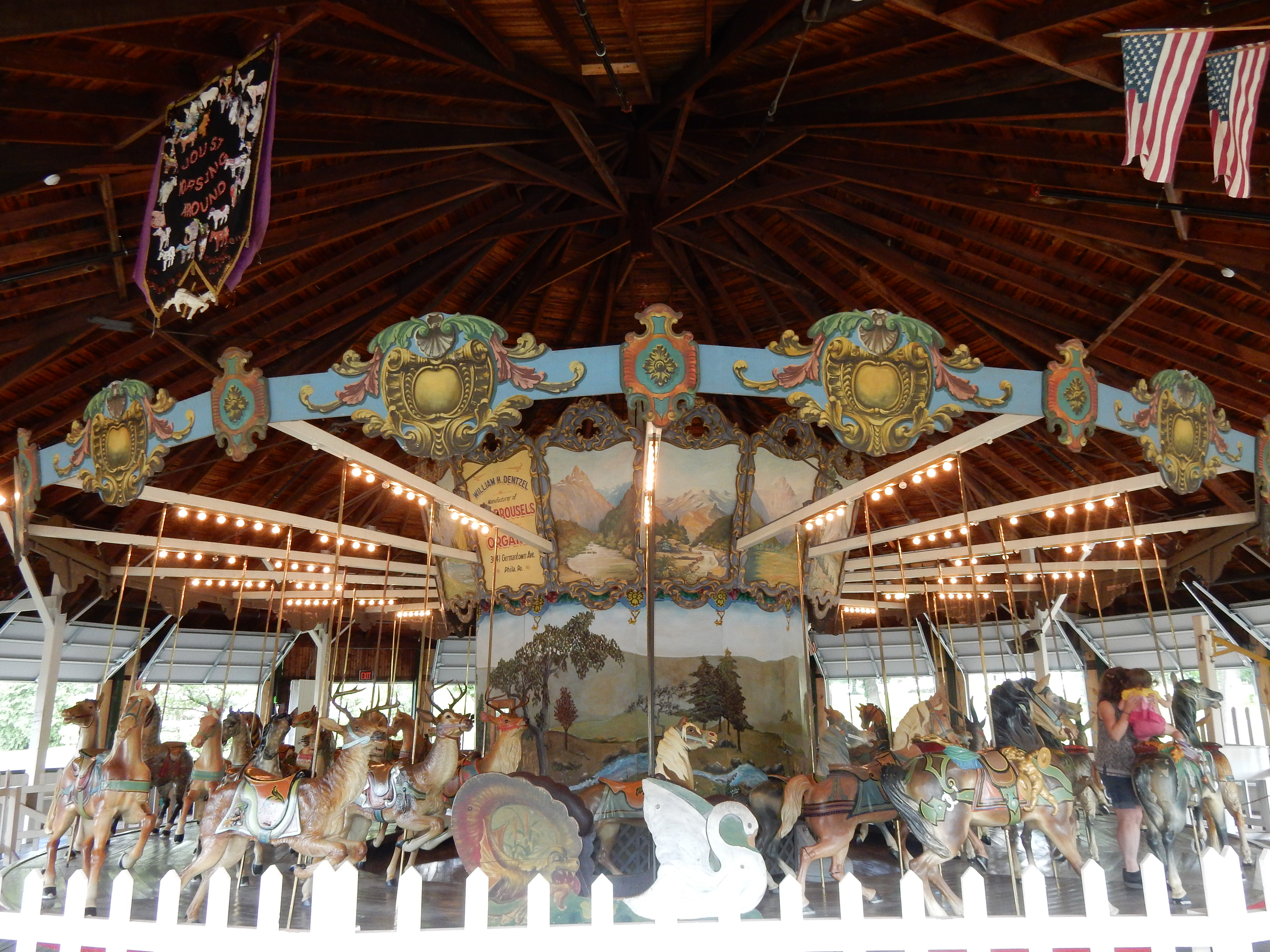

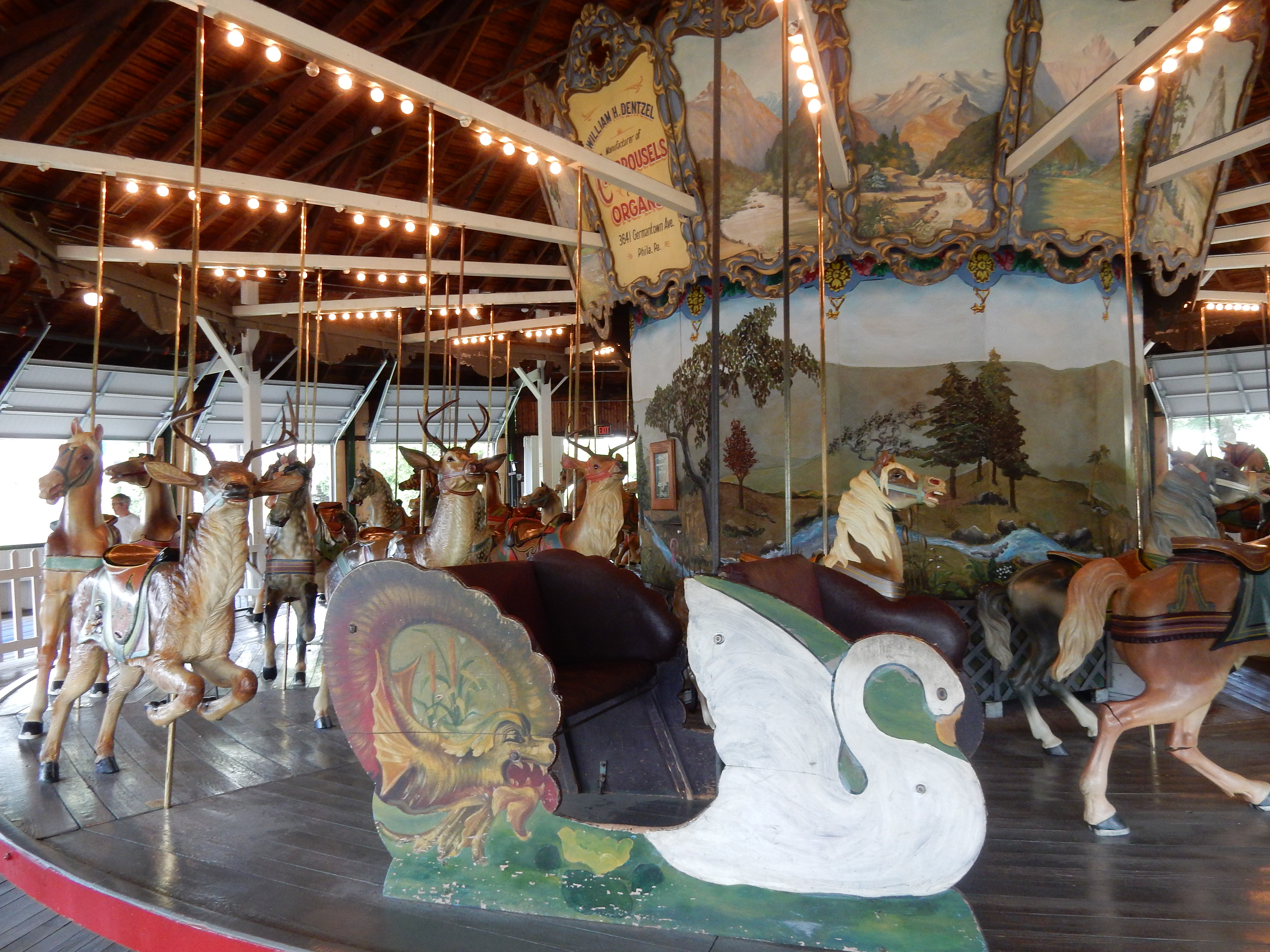
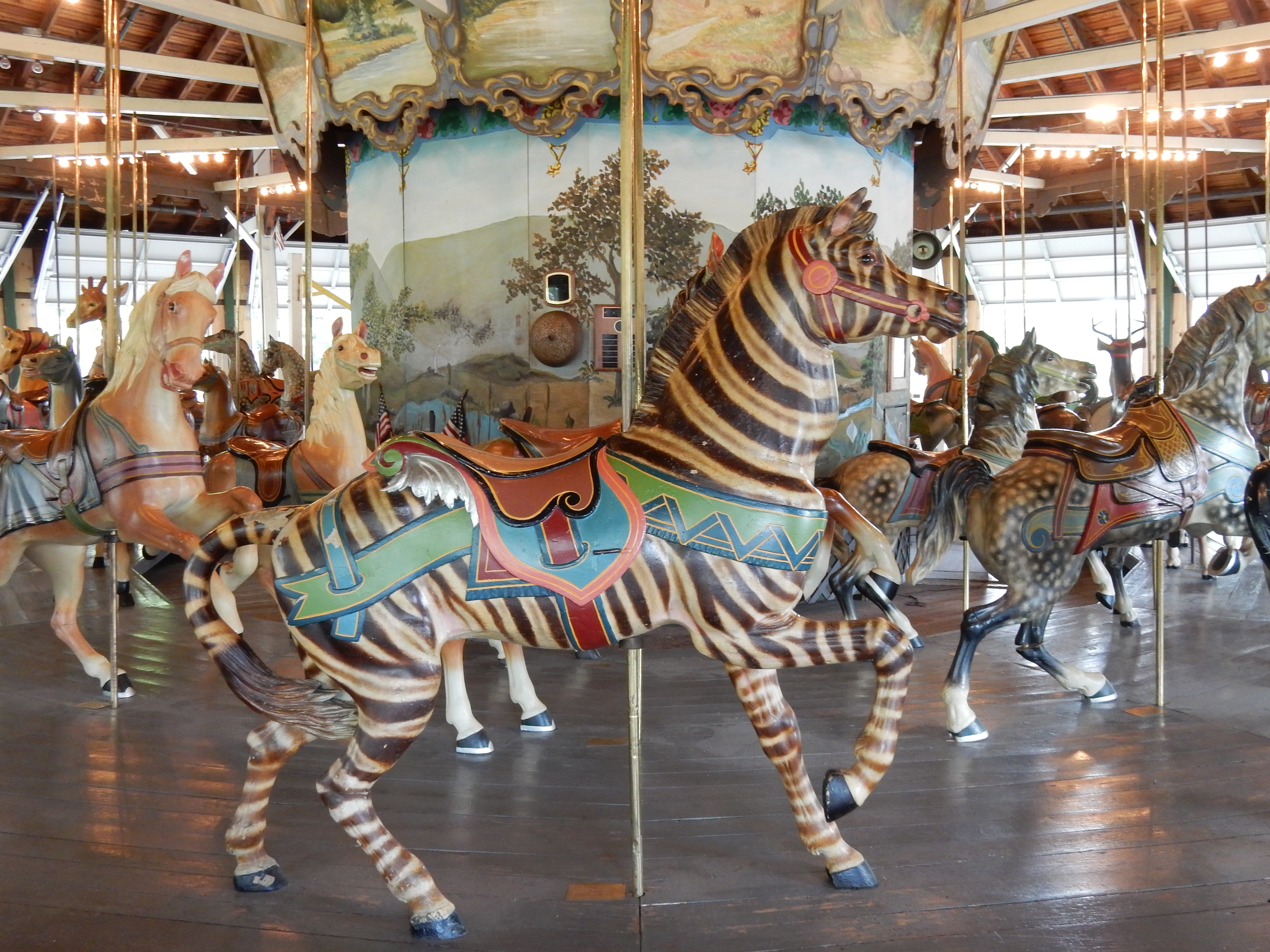

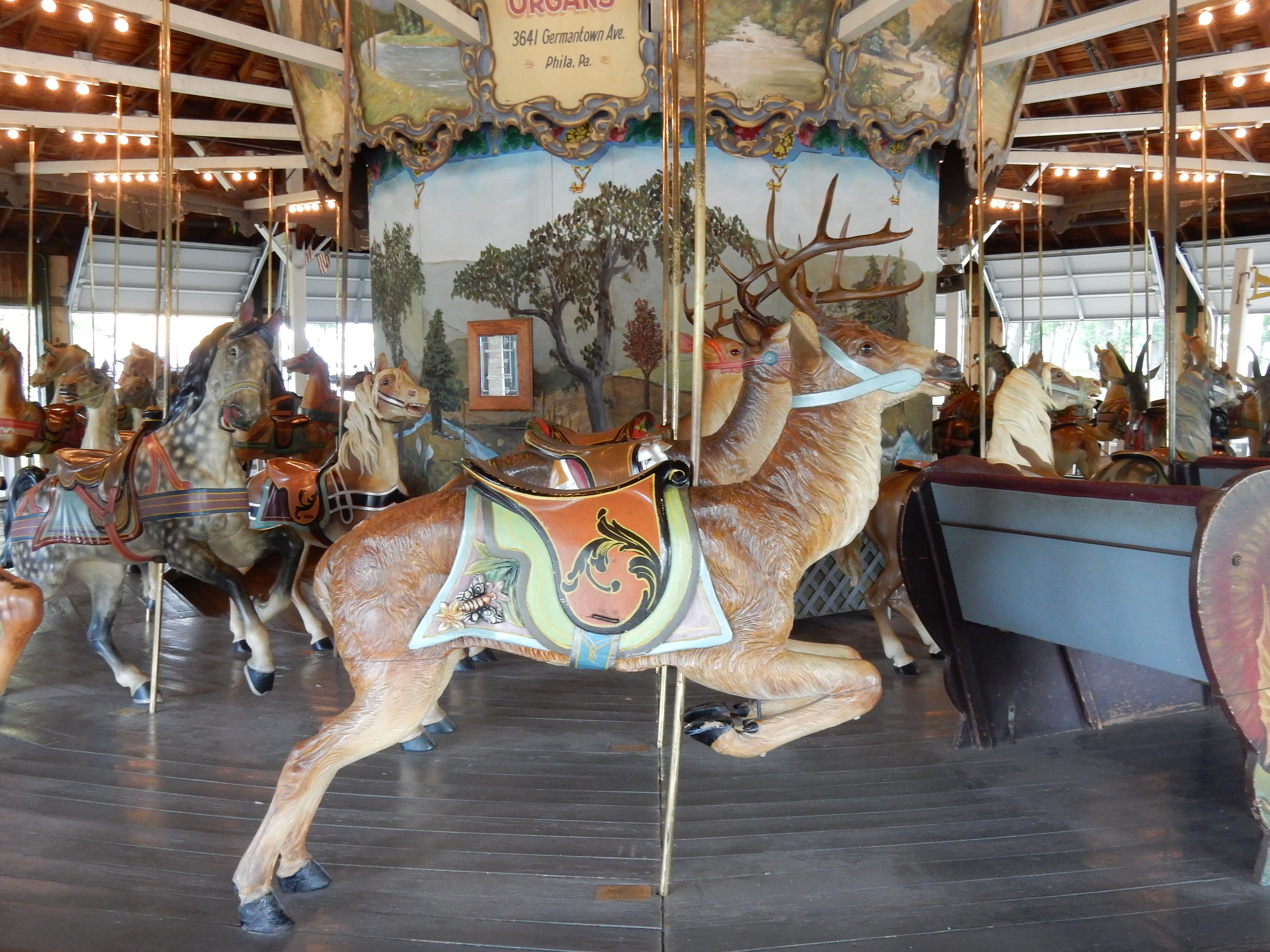

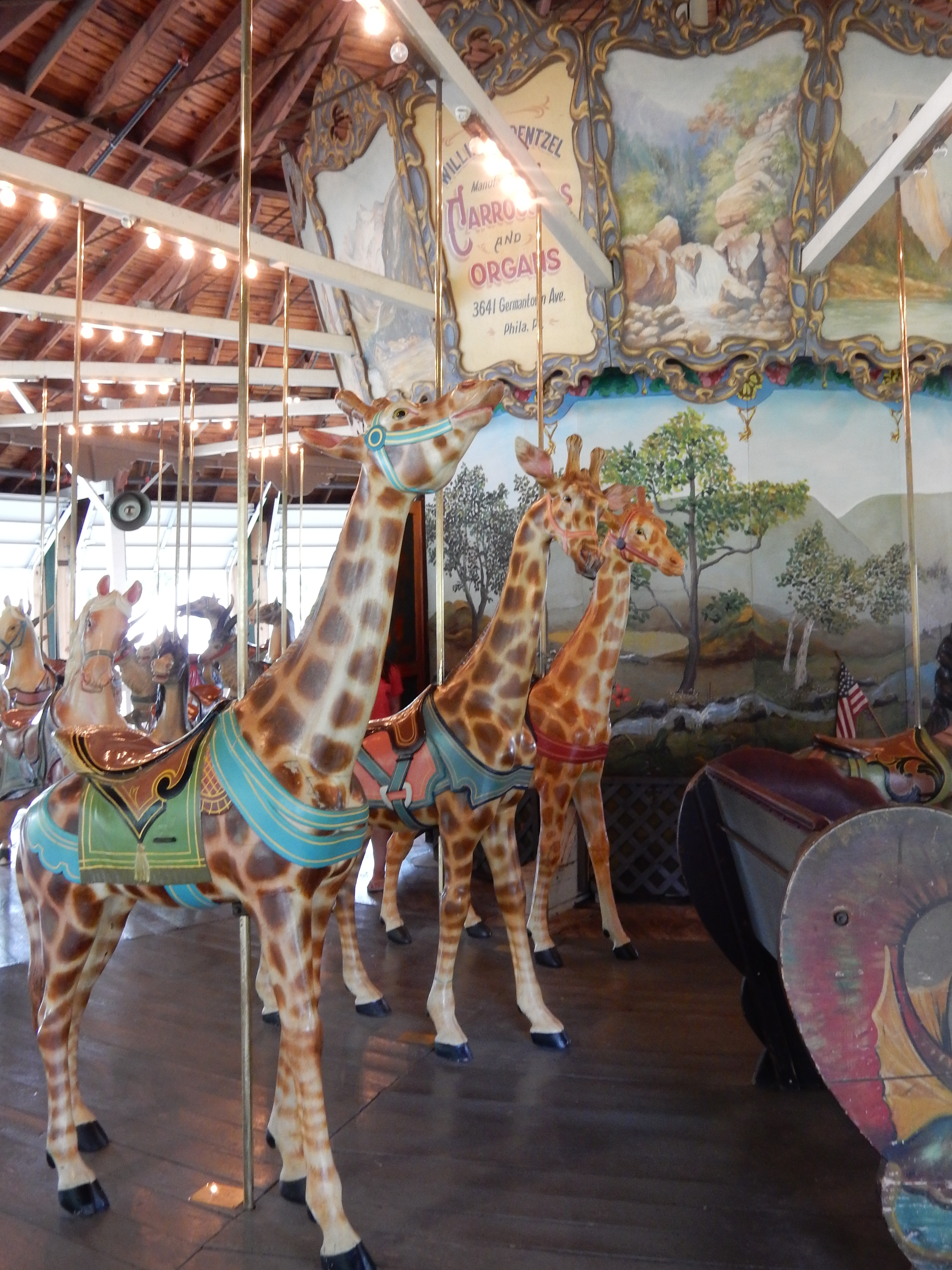

== See also ==
- Amusement rides on the National Register of Historic Places
