= Gustav Dentzel =

German-born American carousel-builder (1846-1909)

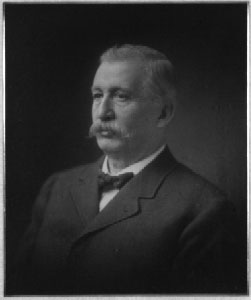
- Gustav Dentzel
- Born: August 3, 1846; Kreuznach, Rhine Province, Kingdom of Prussia
- Died: January 20, 1909 (aged 62)
- Burial place: Northwood Cemetery, Philadelphia, Pennsylvania
- Occupation: Carousel builder
- Known for: Founded the Dentzel Carousel Company
- Spouses: Alma (married 1874); Mary (married 1881)
- Children: Augusta; William H. I.; Margaret; Helen; Charles; Edward P. (w/Mary)

Gustav Dentzel was a German immigrant who built some of the earliest carousels in the United States.

== Early life ==
Gustav Dentzel was born in Kreuznach, Kingdom of Prussia, on August 3, 1846. As a child, Gustav traveled around various German-speaking areas from fair to fair with his father Michael and his family during the summer, operating a portable carousel ride. Gustav learned the art of woodworking from his father. He carved carousel animals and made wagons during the off-season.

== Career ==
Michael sent Gustav and his brothers to the United States in 1864, along with a carousel. This may have been the first carousel in the New World. Gustav opened a cabinet making shop and hired many German and Italian immigrants who had learned woodcarving in the "Old Country". He built a small carousel and toured the countryside. Gustav founded the Dentzel Carousel Company (also spelled Dentzel Carrousel Company, among other variations) in Germantown, Pennsylvania, in 1867. Dentzel is credited for introducing the first steam-powered carousel and the use of menagerie animals, such as cats, lions, tigers, and deer, in addition to horses and chariots.

== Personal life ==
Gustav married Alma in 1874. Together they had five children, Augusta, William H. I., Margaret, Helen, and Charles. Alma died in 1880 and Gustav then married Mary. They had a son, Edward P.

Gustav died in 1909. His sons, William and Edward, took over the company until William's death in 1928.

== Bibliography ==
- "Gustav Dentzel and Dentzel Carousel".
- "The Dentzel Family Carousel Story".
