= Woodlands Regional Library =

Regional library in Singapore

Coordinates: 1°26′6″N 103°47′12″E

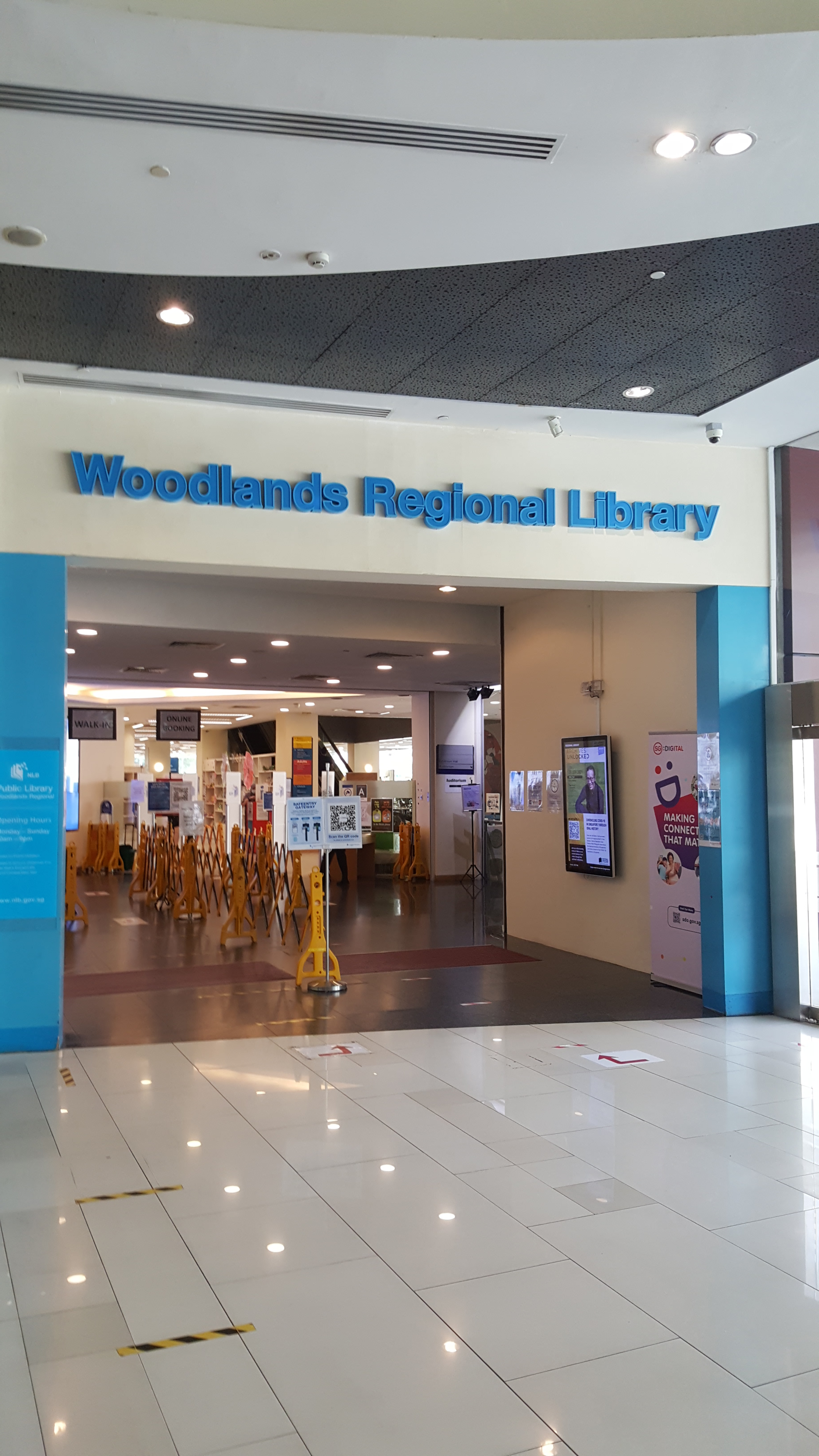
- Woodlands Regional Library
- Location: 900 South Woodlands Drive, #01-03, Woodlands Civic Centre, Singapore 730900, Singapore
- Type: Regional Library
- Established: 28 April 2001; 25 years ago
- Branch of: National Library Board

Collection
- Size: 540,000

Other information
- Public transit access: NS9 TE2 Woodlands, Woodlands Bus Interchange

The Woodlands Regional Library (WRL; Chinese: 兀兰区域图书馆; Malay: Perpustakaan Wilayah Woodlands) is a regional public library in Woodlands in the North Region of Singapore. It is within the premises of the Woodlands Civic Centre, near Causeway Point, Woodlands Bus Interchange and Woodlands MRT station. The library has a floor space of 11,100 square metres and has 540,000 items in its collection.

== History ==
Woodlands Regional Library was officially opened on 28 April 2001 by Dr Tony Tan Kheng Yam, then-Deputy Prime Minister of Singapore, Minister for Defence and MP, Sembawang GRC (who later became Singapore's 7th President). It was Singapore’s first full-fledged regional library following the prototype regional library in Tampines. Occupying four storeys and part of a basement over a floor space of 11,100 square meters in the Woodlands Civic Centre, it is a one-stop information centre for the northern sector of Singapore.

== Layout ==
Woodlands Regional Library occupies four floors within Woodlands Civic Centre including a basement level.

=== Basement ===
The basement consists of an auditorium with 250 seats.

=== Level 1 ===
Also known as the Lifestyle section, the first level of the library is where the multimedia section is situated in. It has many collections of CDs, DVDs and magazines and newspapers. This level also consists of Artease Cafe as well as a few automated counters for borrowing books.

=== Level 2 ===
The second level is where the Reference section and self-contained multimedia booths for surfing the Internet are located. It has a wide collection of reference books, CDs and magazines which cannot be loaned from this level. There are also research carrels for people who want to conduct research, and a photocopy machine in one corner of the level. The Young People's section are also located on this level.

=== Level 3 ===
The third level is the section for adult fiction and non-fiction in Singaporeʻs four national languages; English, Chinese, Malay and Tamil, and also has counters for borrowing books, like those in the first floor. It also has a Quiet Reading Room for people who want to read quietly.

=== Level 4 ===
The fourth level is where the children section is. It also has a small garden-like feature, called the Enchanted Tree as well as the Children's Reading Park.
