= Admiralty, Singapore =

Admiralty
- Subzone of Sembawang Planning Area

Name transcription(s)
  - Chinese: 海军部/海軍部
  - Pinyin: Hǎijūnbù
  - Malay: Admiralty
  - Tamil: அட்மிரல்ட்டி
- Location of Admiralty within Singapore
- Coordinates: 1.45317°N 103.82504°E
- Country: Singapore

Admiralty is a subzone of the planning area of Sembawang, in the north of Singapore.

== Overview ==
The Admiralty area contains integrated development plans including Kampung Admiralty, which was launched in April 2014. The community centre for the neighbourhood, named "ACE The Place Community Club", is located at 120 Woodlands Avenue 1 near Woodlands South MRT station. It was officially opened on 2 March that year, replacing a void deck space at Block 547, Woodlands Drive 16 which had been in use since 2003.

== Etymology ==
This name "Admiralty" reflects the area's association with the large British Naval Base (in the Sembawang area) that was established between 1923 and 1941. Given that the residence of the Rear Admiral of the British Navy was located in this area, the road name probably reflects the Naval High Command. When the British began the construction of the Naval Base they laid out and developed Admiralty Road in 1923 which ran through the Naval Base area. The base was the key British installation in the region and was projected as the Asian bastion of the British Empire between the world wars. The base lacked land-based defences which contributed towards the fall of Singapore in 1942 during the Second World War.

The British Prime Minister Winston Churchill, who authorised removal of the covering garrison in British Malaya as First Lord of the Admiralty, recognised his error, stating "I ought to have known, and I ought to have asked about this matter, amid the thousands of questions I put, was that the possibility of Singapore having no landward defenses no more entered my mind than that of a battleship being launched without a bottom".

== Transportation ==
Admiralty is connected to Sembawang and Yishun via Gambas Avenue, the Woodlands and Senoko Industrial Parks via Woodlands Avenue 10, Central Woodlands via Woodlands Avenue 7, Marsiling via Woodlands Avenue 3 and Woodlands Square, and the Central Expressway via Woodlands Avenue 12.

The district is also served by Admiralty station on the North-South Line.
