= Woodlands, Singapore =

Planning Area and Regional Centre in North Region, Singapore

Woodlands
- Planning area and regional centre

Other transcription(s)
  - Chinese: 兀兰
  - Malay: Woodlands
  - Tamil: ஊட்லண்ட்ஸ்
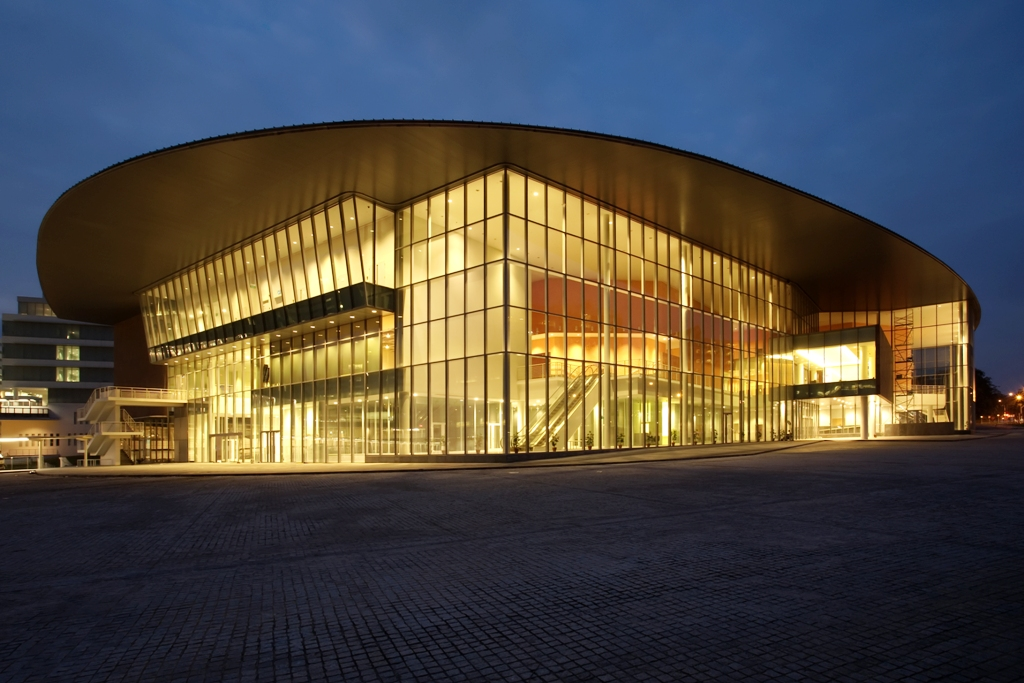
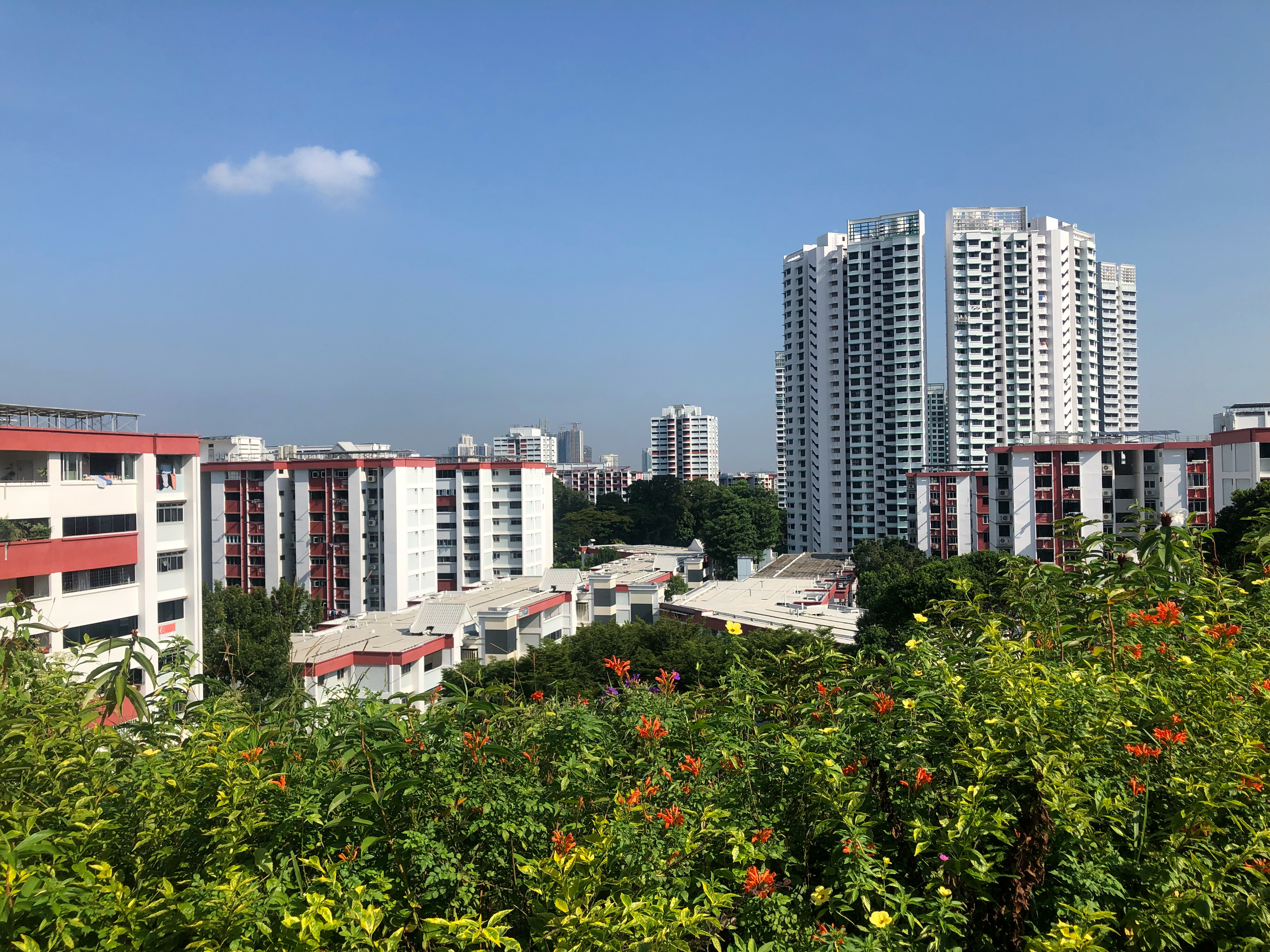
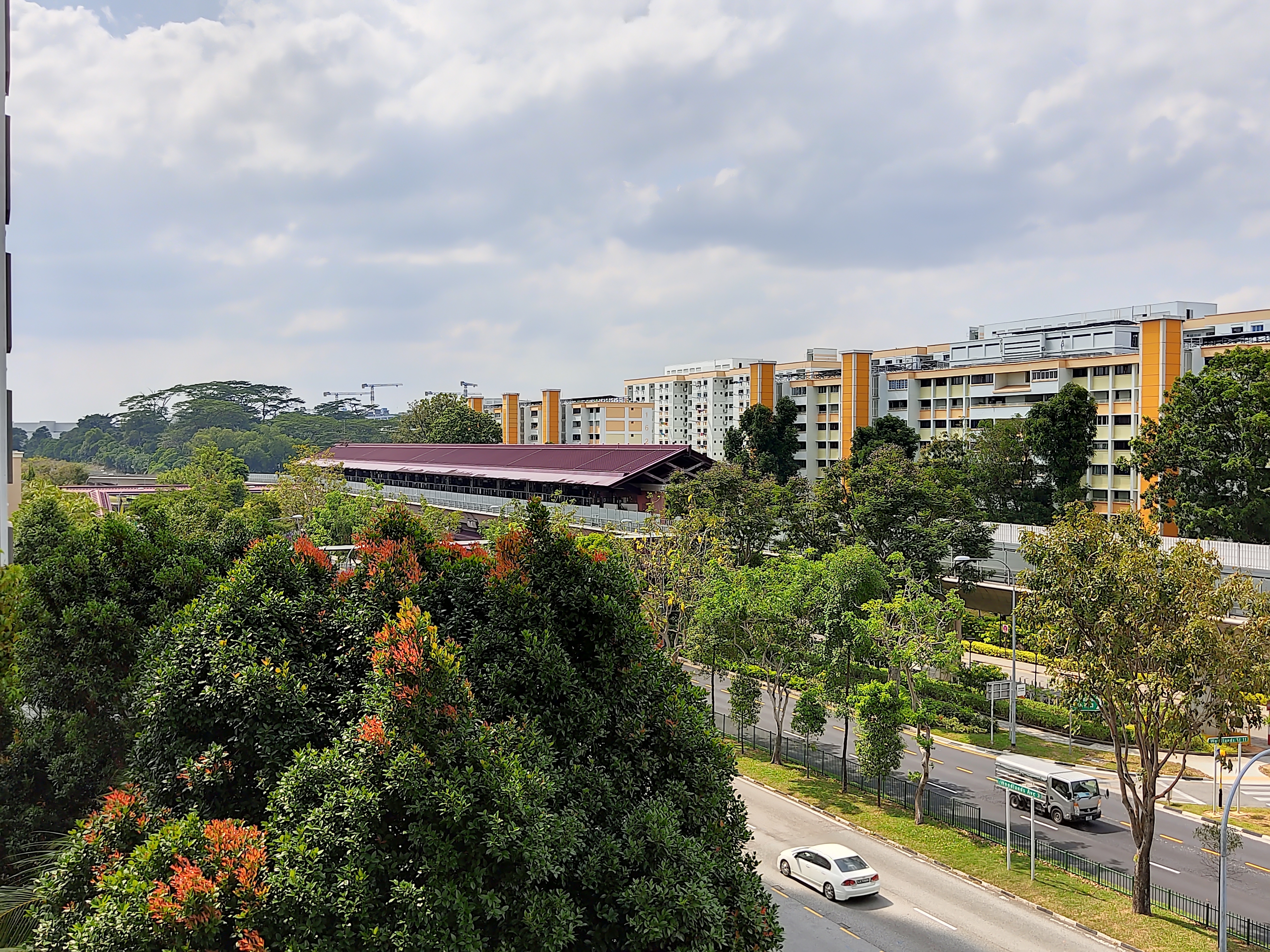
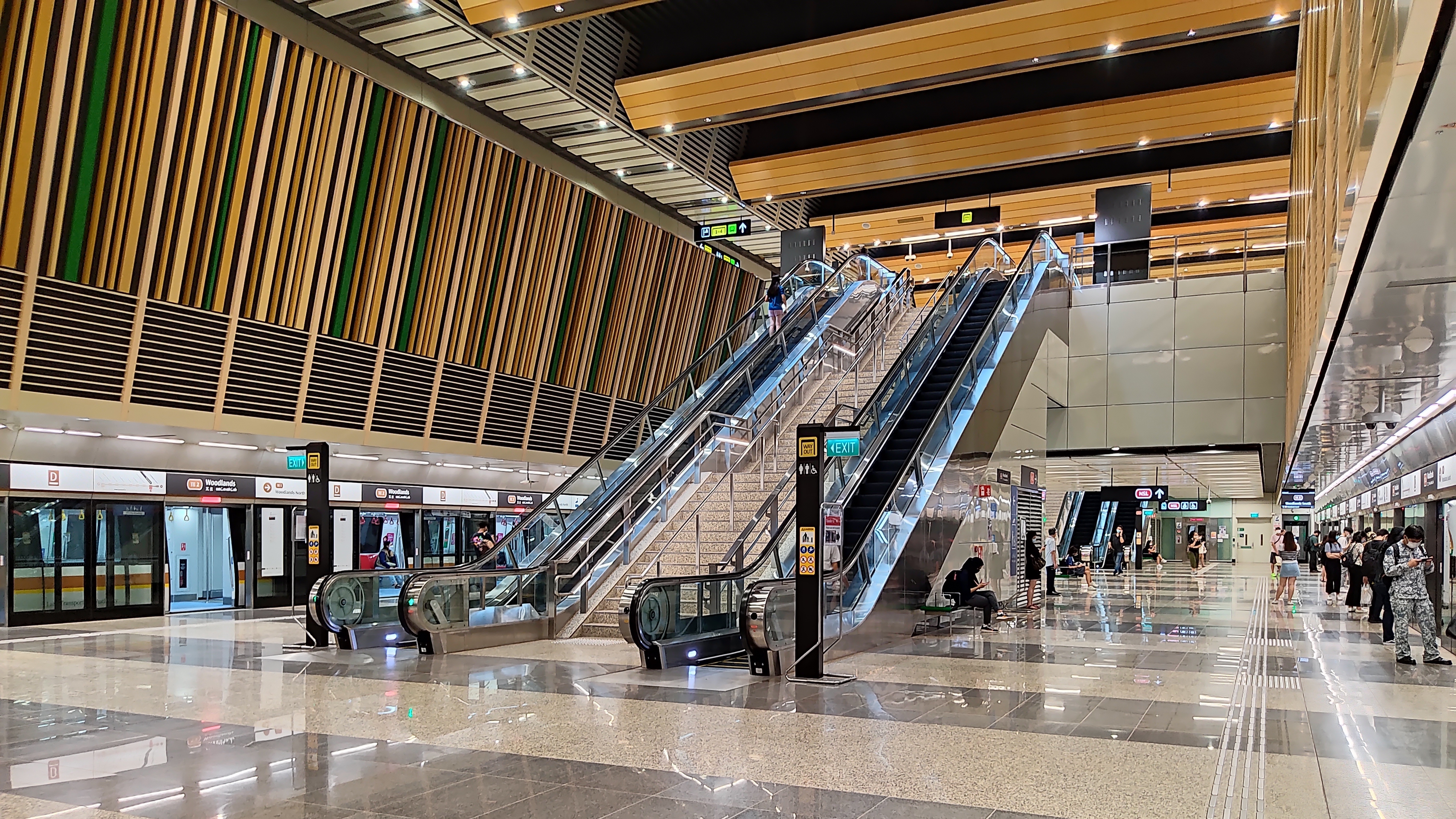
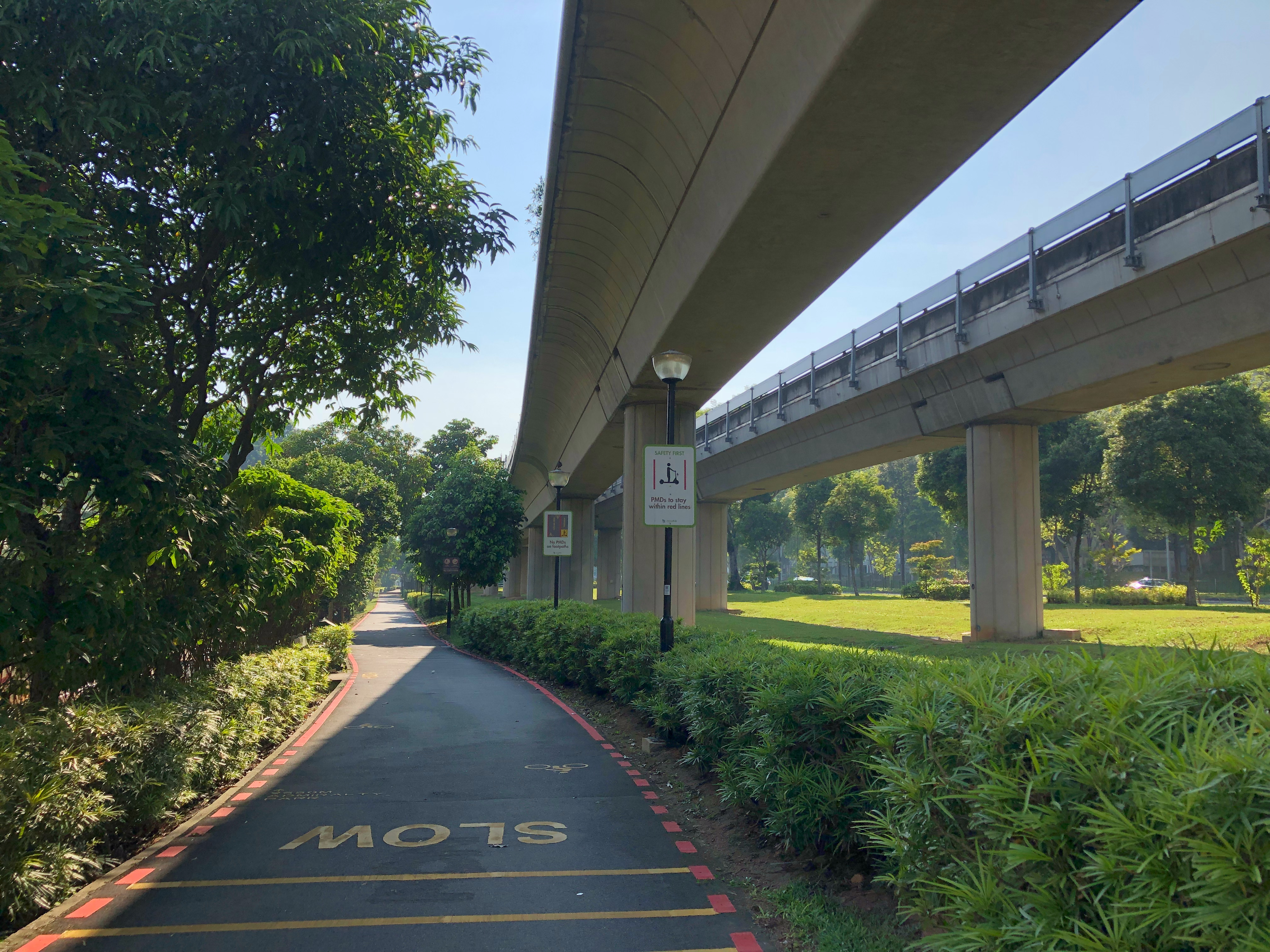
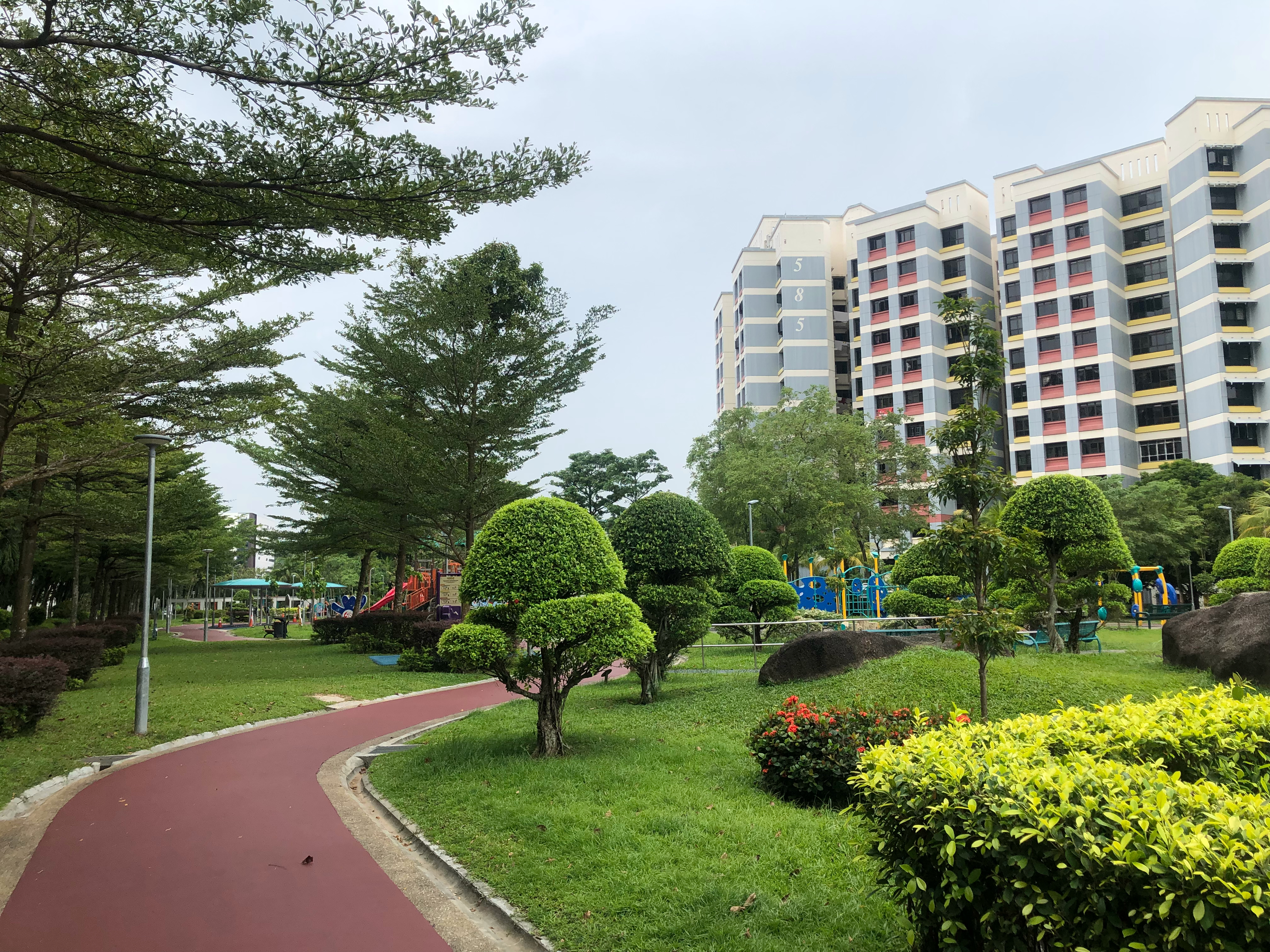
- From top left to right: Republic Polytechnic, Woodlands Town Park East, Marsiling MRT station, Woodlands MRT station, Woodlands Park Connector, HDB flats along Woodlands Drive 16
- Location of Woodlands in Singapore
- Location of Woodlands in Singapore

- Woodlands in Singapore Woodlands (Asia) Woodlands (Earth)
- Coordinates: 1°26′10.57″N 103°47′12.14″E
- Country: Singapore
- Region: North Region
- CDC: North West CDC
- Town councils: Marsiling-Yew Tee Town Council; Sembawang Town Council
- Constituencies: Marsiling-Yew Tee GRC; Sembawang GRC; Sembawang West SMC

Government
  - Mayor: North West CDC: Alex Yam
  - Members of Parliament: Marsiling-Yew Tee GRC: Zaqy Mohamad; Hany Soh Hui Bin; Sembawang GRC: Gabriel Lam; Mariam Jaafar; Ng Shi Xuan; Vikram Nair; Sembawang West SMC: Poh Li San

Area
  - Total: 13.61 km^{2} (5.25 sq mi)
  - Residential: 6.90 km^{2} (2.66 sq mi)

Population (2026)
  - Total: 255,280
  - Density: 18,760/km^{2} (48,580/sq mi)
- Demonym: Official: Woodlands resident
- Postal district: 25
- Dwelling units: 62,675
- Projected ultimate: 98,000

Woodlands, Singapore
- Traditional Chinese: 兀蘭
- Simplified Chinese: 兀兰
Transcriptions
Standard Mandarin
- Hanyu Pinyin: wù lán
- IPA: [û.lǎn]

Woodlands is the regional centre of the North Region of Singapore. As of 2019, the town had a population of 254,733. Located approximately 25 km (16 miles) north of the city-centre, it is the densest planning area for the northern parts of the country.

The Woodlands planning area borders Sembawang to the east, Mandai to the south and Sungei Kadut to the west. It has nine subzones; Greenwood Park, Midview, North Coast, Senoko West, Woodgrove, Woodlands East, Woodlands Regional Centre, Woodlands South and Woodlands West. Woodlands New Town is situated within the Woodlands planning area, which was developed during the 1980s as part of Singapore's plan to decentralise the city centre and create self-contained residential areas throughout the country.

Woodlands also serves as one of the two international land border connections on the Singaporean side between Singapore and Malaysia at Woodlands Checkpoint, which leads to the Johor–Singapore Causeway. The other connection is the Tuas Second Link at Tuas.

== History ==
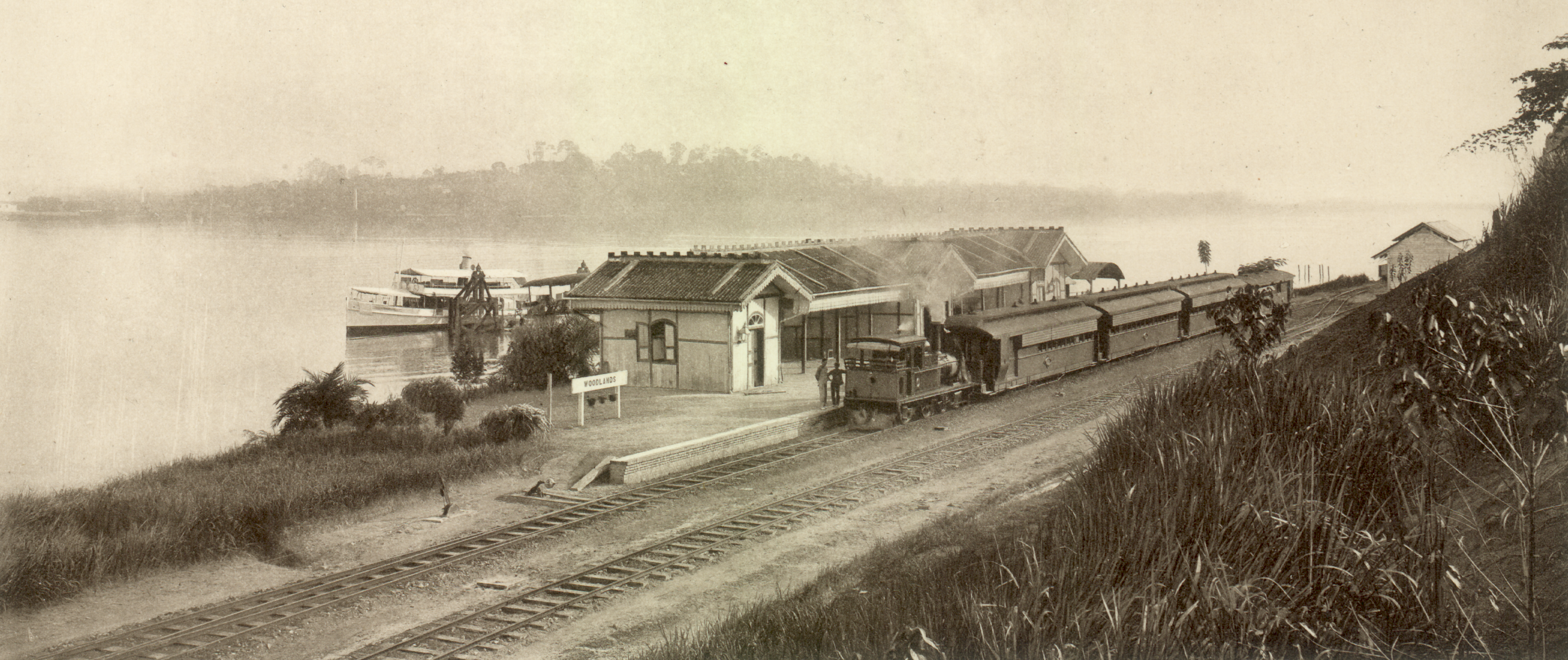
Woodlands station, circa 1910.

=== British administration ===
The area consisting of modern-day Woodlands Town first witnessed the opening of the Johor-Singapore Causeway in 1923. Early Woodlands consisted of villages where residents made their living mostly as small-time shopkeepers and vegetable farmers in the Marsiling area, while rubber plantations and poultry farms dot the landscape at where modern-day Admiralty is located.

=== Post-independence ===
The first HDB flats were built from 1972 in the northern part of Marsiling, and the Woodlands Bus Interchange located at Woodlands Centre Road was built in 1980.

Woodlands was politically divided into Bukit Panjang Single Member Constituency (SMC) and Sembawang SMC before 1988; both were merged in 1991 into Sembawang Group Representation Constituency (GRC) due to growing development.

The development of Woodlands began in 1981. This comprises the building of HDB flats in the Neighbourhood 1, which was completed in 1985; well after the Marsiling Estate. The Neighbourhood 8 was completed in 1987, together with the Neighbourhood 3 in 1989. Because of the saturation of HDB flats, the numbering system added 'A', 'B' and 'C'. Blocks 6xx in Admiralty were completed in 1996, together with the 7xx in 1997. Expansion into Innova began in 1998 and was completed in 2002, which consists of block 5xx. Expansion into the Woodlands East began in 1999 and completed in 2004.

The Jalan Ulu Sembawang is a rural road that cut across parts of the Woodlands New Town and the Sembawang Airbase. Starting from June 1992, the Jalan Ulu Sembawang is being cleared because of the extension of Woodlands New Town, Gambas Avenue, Sembawang Airbase and the Seletar Expressway. The village was cleared by 1996 and it was being converted into a military training ground.

== Neighbourhood layout ==
There are three constituencies in the town, and nine neighbourhoods (N1 to N9) within the Woodlands vicinity made up primarily of Woodlands, Marsiling, Woodgrove and Admiralty. Woodlands Square serves as the town centre while adjacent neighbourhood centres also offer a variety of commercial activities. Integrated development plans including Kampung Admiralty (Admiralty Village) were officially launched in April 2014, with the integrated development being completed in 2017.

Name of Neighbourhood	Location	Commercial Areas	Accessibility
Woodlands	Centre, Northeast, Northwest and West of Woodlands Town	Causeway Point, Woodlands Civic Centre, Woodlands Square, Woodlands North Plaza, Vista Point, Woods Square	Via MRT at Woodlands MRT station or buses from Woodlands Bus Interchange
Marsiling	West and Southwest of Woodlands Square	Marsiling Mall, Marsiling-Yew Tee Town Council and Woodlands Checkpoint	Via MRT at Marsiling MRT station
Woodgrove	South from Woodlands Square	The Woodgrove	Via buses from Woodlands Bus Interchange
Admiralty	East from Woodlands Square	888 Plaza, Woodlands Mart and Kampung Admiralty	Via MRT at Admiralty MRT station, or buses from Woodlands Bus Interchange

Of all the estates, Woodgrove is the smallest in size, located towards the southwest end of the town. Woodgrove houses most of the private housing in Woodlands, consisting of high-rise condominiums and landed properties. Woodgrove lies in between the estates of Marsiling and Woodlands.

Marsiling, Woodlands, Woodgrove and Admiralty all together form Woodlands New Town.

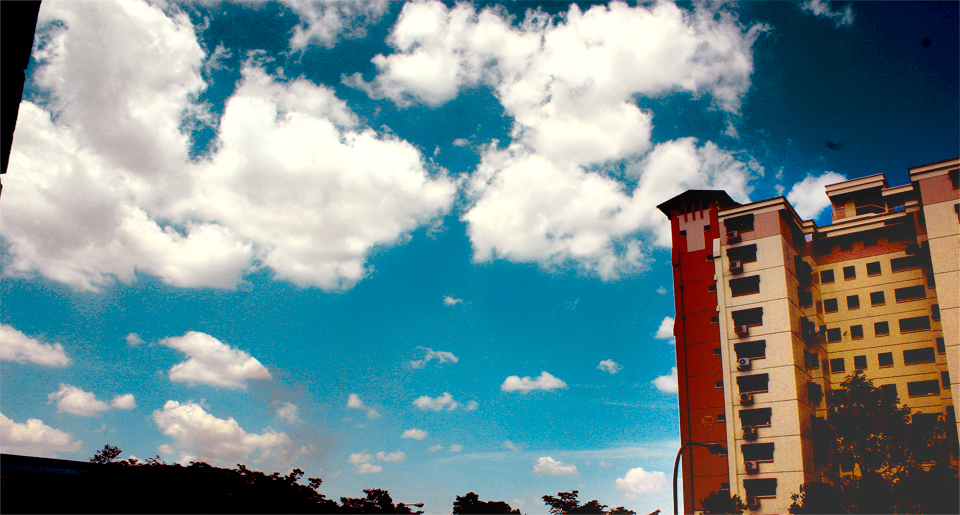
Woodlands estate

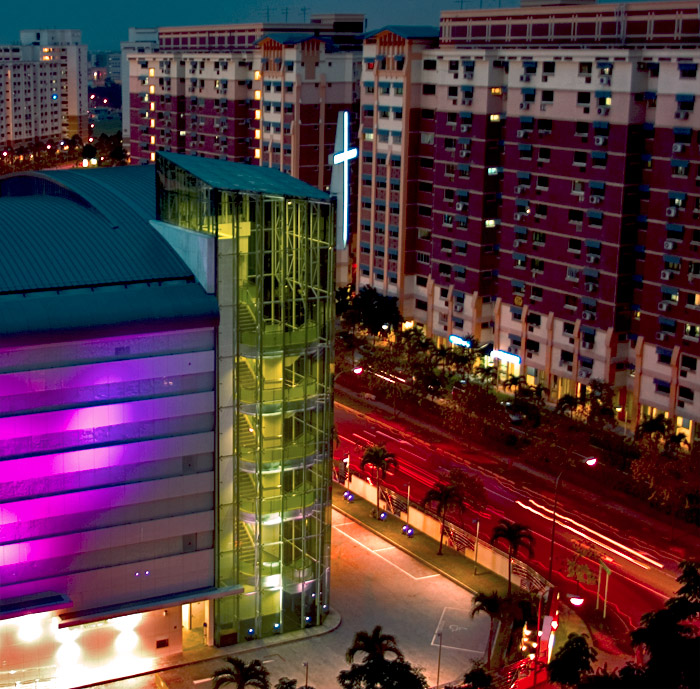
Woodlands at night

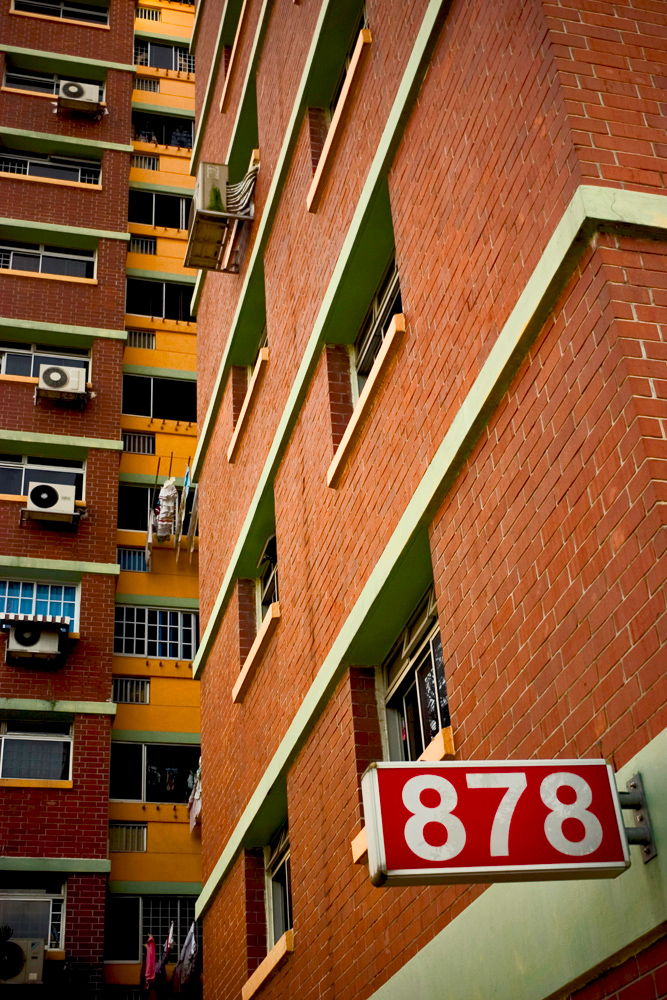
A housing apartment block in Woodlands Avenue 9, southern portion of the Woodlands estate

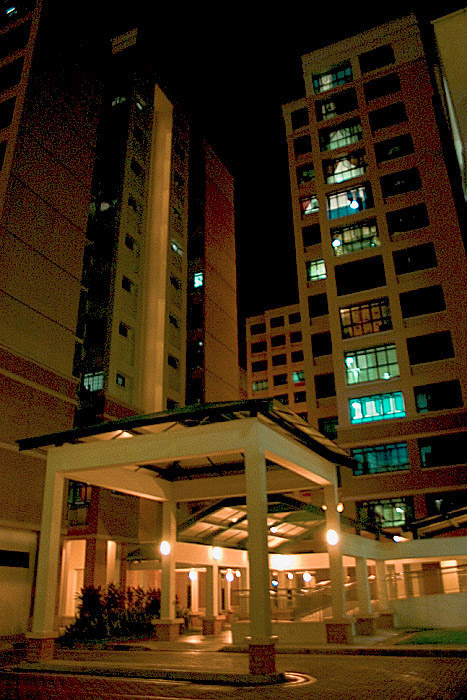
HDB Apartment Blocks in Woodlands

== Facilities ==
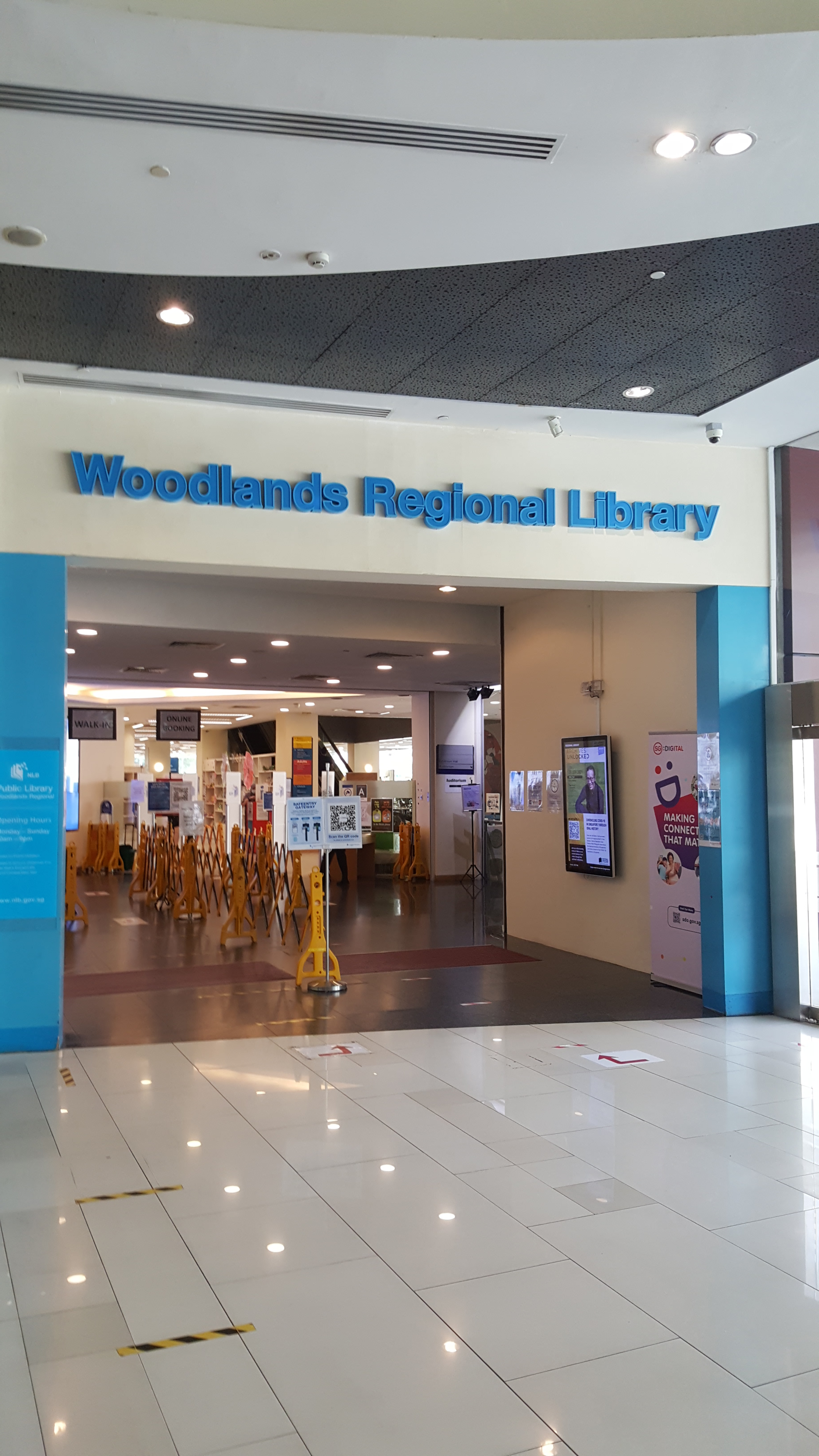
Woodlands Regional Library.

Woodlands is diverse during the day and well lit at night. Shops, eateries, and commercial zones are evenly spread through the town, with bus and transit routes operating past midnight.

Divisions within estates are being rapidly modernised and modelled for Singapore's standards; playgrounds, communal gardens, sheltered pavements, multi-level parking lots, barbecue-pits, recreational facilities (such as tennis courts) and trees are found nearly everywhere.

=== Parks ===
With the modernising process outpacing the preservation of its past, Marsiling Park (formerly Woodlands Town Garden) keeps a clear and simple agenda, to bring greenery in the right ambience with the mixture of the local ethnicities. The theme of the park revolves around the Malay and Chinese cultures, and winding through the park is Sungei Mandai Kechil, the river that extends into a lake within the park. Marsiling Park is located near to the Woodlands Checkpoint, in the Marsiling estate.

To the east of this area, bordering the polytechnic is Admiralty Park, a 27-hectare national park much of which is covered in mangrove. The most recent riverine park which opened in phases is the Woodlands Waterfront Park. It has engaged a lot of residents, especially those staying in northern Singapore. It is also linked to Admiralty Park and a 25 km Northern Explorer Park Connector Network.

Mandai Tekong Park, located at Woodlands Avenue 5, is a lawned park among residential areas consisting of a fenced off court for ball games & benches with a running track.

Vista Park is located at Woodlands Drive 16 among residential areas. It is a park situated at a walking distance to Vista Point and consists of playgrounds and running tracks for recreational purposes.

=== Malls ===
Causeway Point, one of the largest shopping malls in Singapore, houses 250 shops and various outlets, including a cinema and two food courts. There used to be a John Little department store within the mall but it closed in 2010.

Woodlands Regional Library, the largest neighbourhood library in Singapore at the time of its launch, is operated by the National Library Board. The four-storey public library within the Woodlands Civic Centre caters to all ages and is organised according to themes of general, reference, teens, and children.

Woodlands Civic Centre is a designated centre of education, public services, and other forms of assistance for residents. The centre houses the Woodlands Regional Library, several banks, CPF Woodlands Branch, a post office, numerous merchandise and educational institutions, and restaurants.

Woods Square is a mixed use integrated commercial development with retail, F&B, and a childcare centre.

=== Recreation ===
Sports are an emerging emphasis in the Singaporean society. Recreational facilities can be easily located around the estates and especially in parks: The Woodlands Stadium and Woodlands Swimming Complex are common places for sports enthusiasts.

Experimental styles of architecture have found their way into Woodlands, making the town a place of wonder and colour, with much integration with recreation. From their early practical designs to their modern-day luxurious manifestations, housing apartment blocks are no longer as plain as they once sounded. Adorned with parks, communal gardens, and stylish décor, these blocks have become expressions of art and lifestyle. The centrepiece of the town, Woodlands Square, attracts a constant flow of travellers and shoppers daily.

== Education ==
As of May 2020, this area has a total of 12 primary schools, 10 secondary schools and a polytechnic, namely Republic Polytechnic. Educational institutions are evenly distributed throughout the estate. From newly founded schools to well-established ones, Woodlands has several top educational institutions in the northern region. Innova Junior College, located in Woodlands, merged with Yishun Junior College in 2019.

The list of schools in Woodlands is as follows:

=== Primary schools ===
- Admiralty Primary School
- Evergreen Primary School
- Fuchun Primary School
- Greenwood Primary School
- Innova Primary School
- Marsiling Primary School
- Qihua Primary School
- Riverside Primary School
- Si Ling Primary School
- Woodgrove Primary School
- Woodlands Primary School
- Woodlands Ring Primary School

=== Secondary schools ===
- Admiralty Secondary School
- Christ Church Secondary School
- Evergreen Secondary School
- Marsiling Secondary School
- Riverside Secondary School
- Woodgrove Secondary School
- Woodlands Secondary School
- Woodlands Ring Secondary School
- Fuchun Secondary School was closed and merged with Woodlands Ring Secondary School with effect from 2025.
- Si Ling Secondary School was closed and merged with Marsiling Secondary School with effect from 2017.

=== Polytechnics ===
- Republic Polytechnic

=== Specialised schools ===
- Singapore Sports School (independent school for sports-inclined students)
- Spectra Secondary School (for Normal (Technical) students)

=== International schools ===
- Singapore American School

== Places of worship ==
Woodlands has 6 churches, 2 mosques and 12 temples.

=== Churches ===
- Church of Saint Anthony
- Covenant Evangelical Free Church
- Lighthouse Evangelism
- New Life Bible Presbyterian Church
- Woodlands Evangelical Free Church
- Light of Christ Church Woodlands

=== Mosques ===
- An-Nur Mosque
- Yusof Ishak Mosque

=== Temples ===
- Shang Di Miao Chai Kong Temple (上帝廟濟公壇), Marsiling Ind Estate Road 3
- Hong Tho Bilw Temple (鳳圖廟), Marsiling Ind Estate Road 3
- Ching Chwee Temple (清水廟東聖殿), Woodlands Industrial Park E8
- Wu Dang Shan Temple (武當山), Woodlands Industrial Park E8
- Tien Chor Temple (天祖廟), Woodlands Industrial Park E8
- Jin Fu Gong Gong De Tang (金福宮功德堂), Woodlands Industrial Park E8
- Hong Sun Tan Temple (德惠鳳山壇), Woodlands Industrial Park E4
- Fei Loong Gong Temple (飛龍宮), Woodlands Industrial Park E4
- Mandai Lian Hup Tng Temple (萬禮蓮合殿), Woodlands Industrial Park E4
- Siang San Temple (玄山庙救世壇), Woodlands Industrial Park E4
- BW Monastery (吉祥寶聚寺), Woodlands Drive 16
- Siva Krishnan Temple, Marsiling Rise

== Accessibility ==
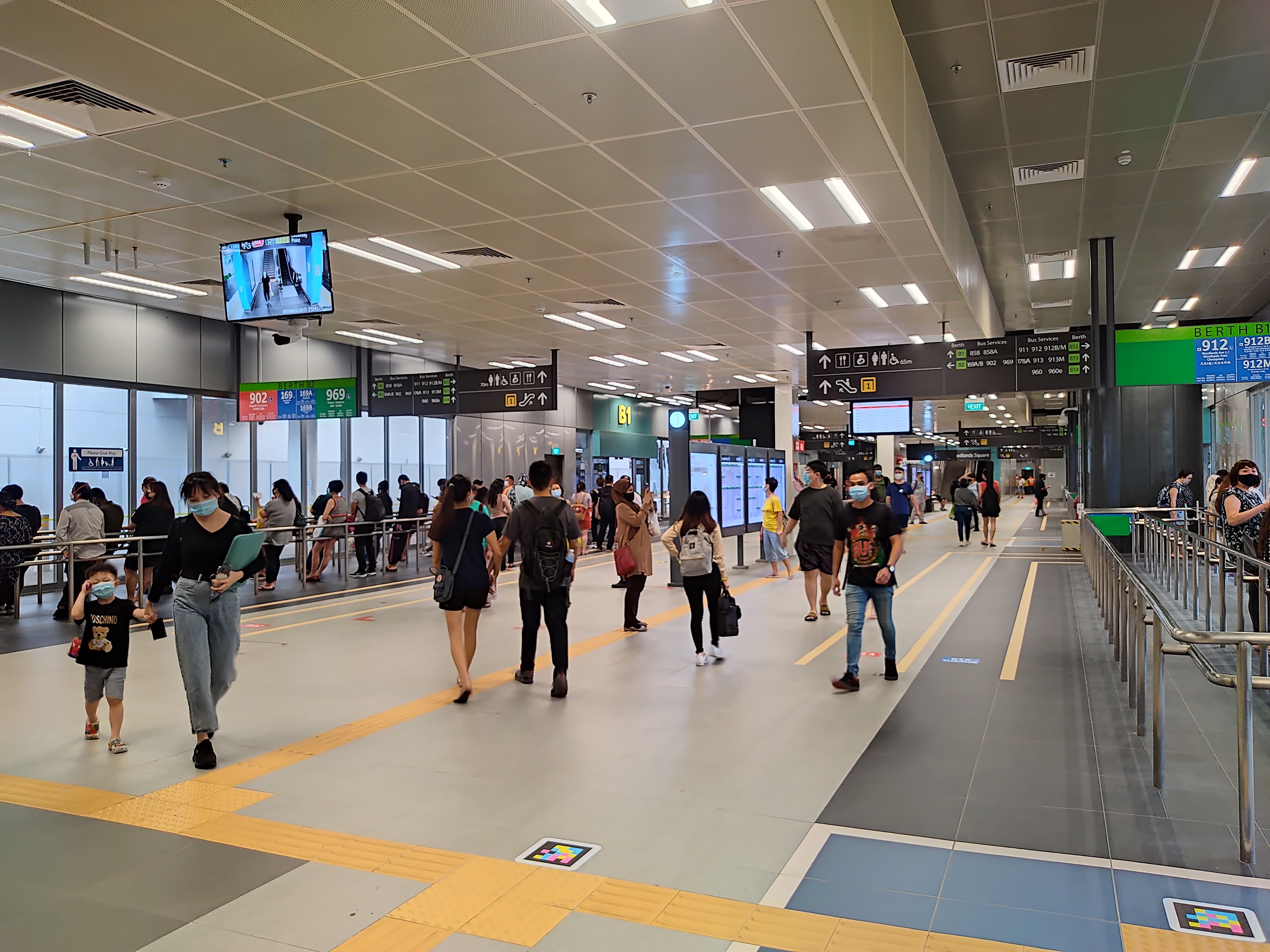
Woodlands Integrated Transport Hub

=== Road ===
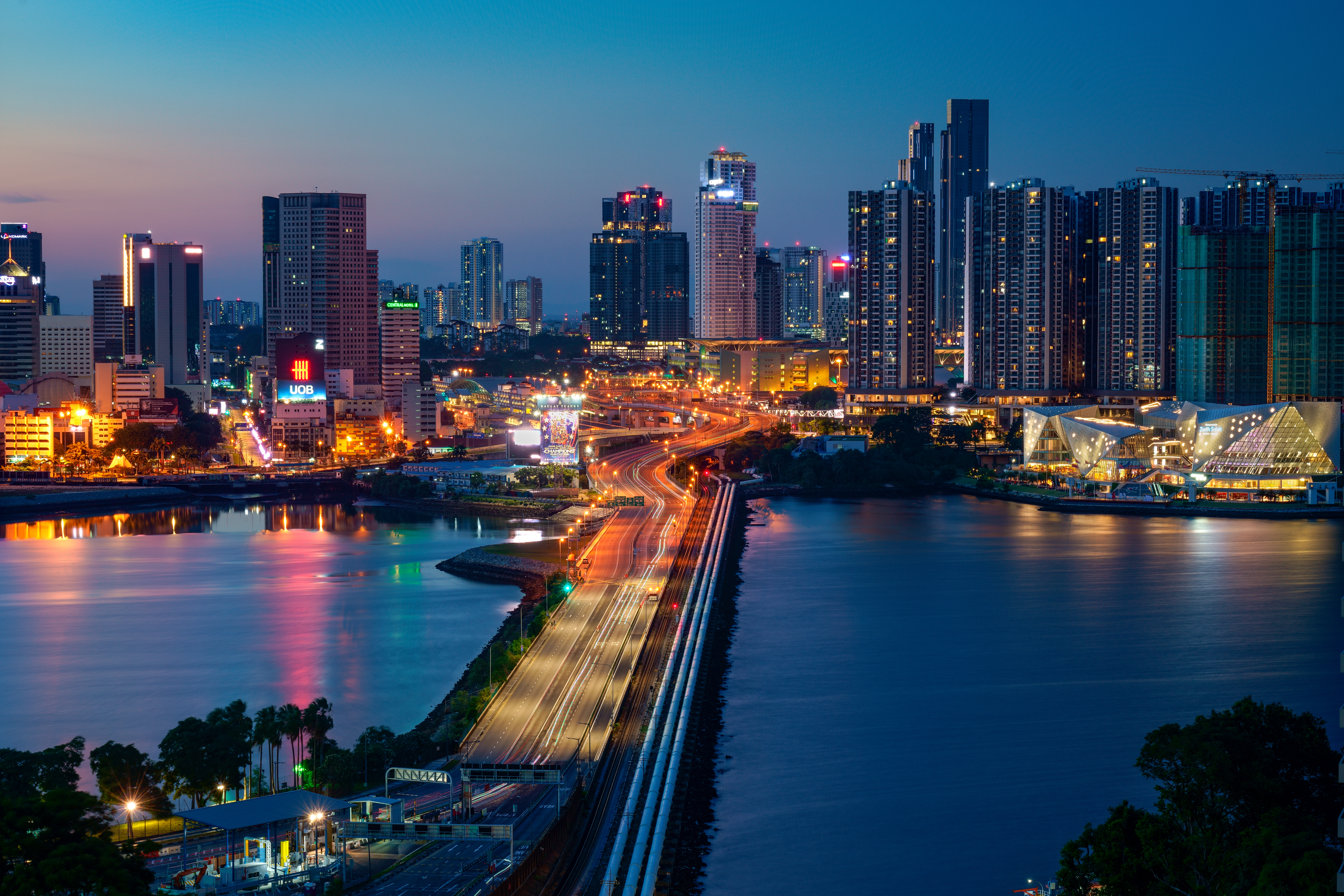
Johor–Singapore Causeway viewed from Woodlands.

Being located immediately across from Johor Bahru, Woodlands is highly accessible, connected by major roads and expressways. The Causeway connects to the Bukit Timah Expressway (BKE) at Woodlands Checkpoint to allow easy access to Woodlands and other parts of Singapore.

Land transportation in Woodlands is relatively efficient, contrasting by the amount of well-maintained roads, a common sight in Singapore. Twelve avenues support and help circulate all of the traffic of the town, especially notable ones such as Avenue 2, Avenue 3 and Avenue 12, which are connected to the expressways.

Woodlands Avenue 2 is a shorter route from the town centre and older estates to the Seletar Expressway (SLE). To connect the Woodlands Avenue 2 into the Seletar Expressway (SLE), part of the road was being built since 1998.

Woodlands Avenue 3 connects Marsiling from the exit of BKE to Woodlands Centre Road, which leads to Woodlands Checkpoint. The rest of it maintains a similar route of the MRT line, which connects to Woodlands Square.

As the avenue ends at the entrance of the slope of Woodlands Square (the road that circulates Woodlands Square), another end starts at Woodlands Avenue 7, which connects Woodlands to Admiralty, also along the route of the MRT line, ending at Gambas Avenue.

Woodlands Avenue 12 forms the southeastern border of the town, connecting the Woodlands Hospital, office buildings as well as the neighbouring town of Sembawang to the Seletar Expressway (SLE).

Divisions within estates are further connected and regulated by two- or single lane roads called streets, which are distinguished by a suffix of double-digit numbers, such as Woodlands Street 82 and Woodlands Street 83. This was a common practice before the late '90s. Drives are two- or single lane roads built for newer divisions within an estate, similar to that of the streets.

Links and Crescents are often three-, two-, or single-lane roads that convey commuters from the main road to another main road, such as the Woodlands Link, which connects Woodlands Avenue 9 to the main roads in the Woodlands Industrial Park. Crescents connect main roads to streets or drives.

=== Rail ===
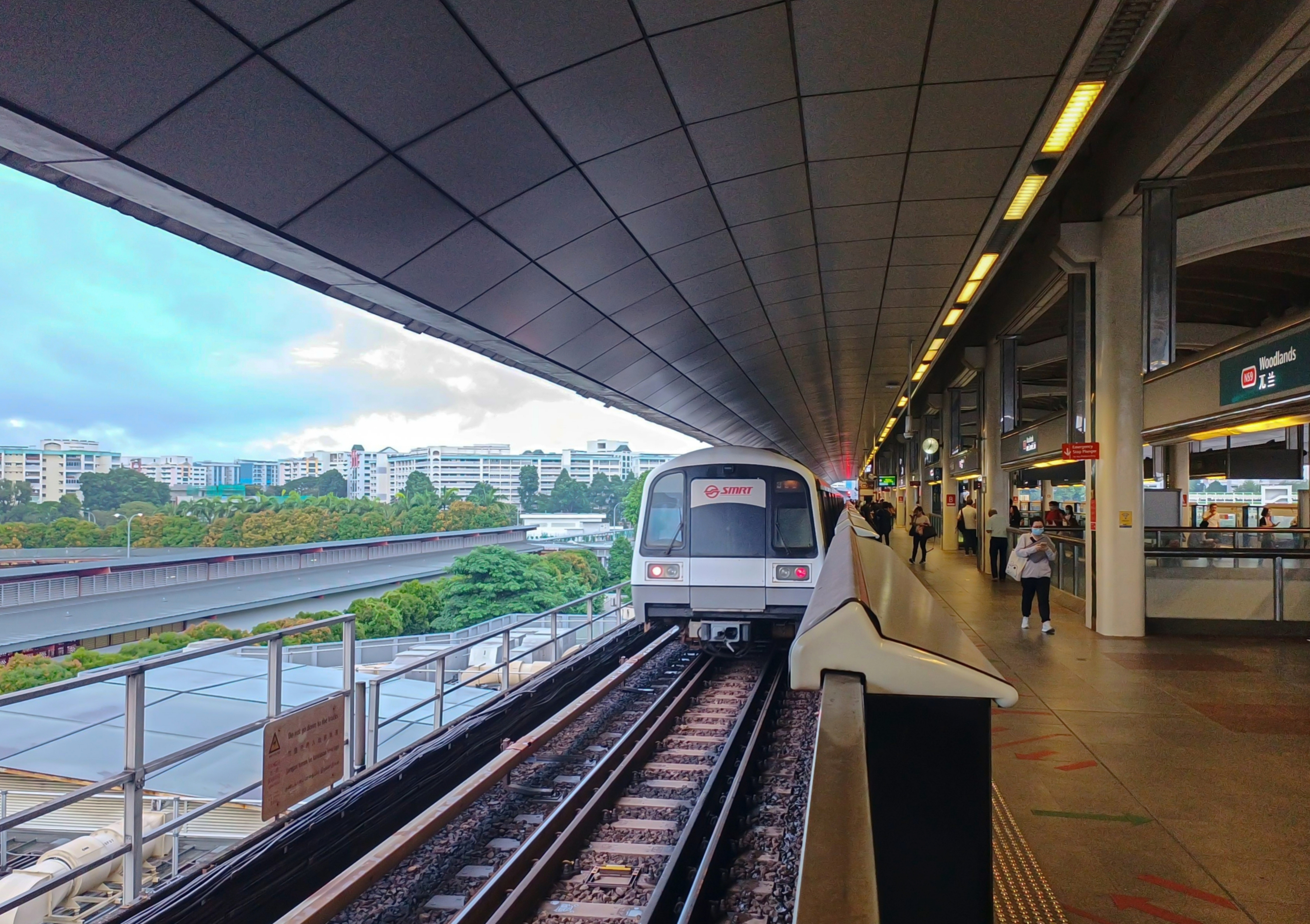
Woodlands MRT Station

Residents of Woodlands are currently serviced by five Mass Rapid Transit (MRT) stations across two MRT lines intersecting each other, the North-South Line and Thomson-East Coast Line:

- NS8 Marsiling (in the West)
- TE1 Woodlands North (in the North)
- NS9 TE2 Woodlands (at the town centre)
- TE3 Woodlands South (in the South)
- NS10 Admiralty (in the East)

The travelling time from Woodlands MRT station to City Hall MRT station in the central business district is approximately 40 minutes.

Woodlands Train Checkpoint is linked by a shuttle train to Johor Bahru Sentral station in Malaysia across the causeway. It is planned to be replaced by a rapid transit link, the Johor Bahru–Singapore Rapid Transit System, which will have its Singapore terminus at Woodlands North MRT station, improving access between Johor Bahru and Singapore.

=== Bus ===
Under the government's plans to develop a new town centre in the geographical centre of Woodlands, the town's bus interchange was relocated from the previous Woodlands Town Centre to the current town centre at Woodlands Square in 1996. This bus interchange, the Woodlands Regional Bus Interchange, was the first underground bus interchange in Singapore, having been built under the Woodlands MRT station. It was built this way to maximise space.

In 2016, Woodlands Temporary Bus Interchange was opened to facilitate renovation work at the former bus interchange, which included connecting it to the Thomson-East Coast Line. All bus services relocated to the temporary interchange. The former bus interchange, which is now known as the Woodlands Integrated Transport Hub, had reopened on 13 June 2021 as the 11th integrated transport hub in Singapore.

=== Cycling ===
By November 2026, a total of 42 km of cycle paths and park connectors have been completed in Woodlands, encompassing most of the planned cycle path network for the town. An additional 9 km of cycle paths will be completed by 2027, while the entire network will be completed beyond 2030. A 1.9 km elevated pedestrian and cycle path, WoodsVista Gallery, will also connect residents of the future Woodlands North Coast housing estates to Woodlands Central, MRT station and bus interchange.

== Politics ==
Prior to the new town developments, Woodlands was under jurisdiction for the Sembawang Constituency until that constituency was upgraded into a GRC in 1988, and several new divisions were created over time to accommodate population growth. Woodlands have since been split into three other constituencies which was the case as of the 2025 election, with the western Woodlands and its sub-town Marsiling merging with the neighbouring Yew Tee to create Marsiling-Yew Tee GRC in 2015, and the small portion of Woodlands near Admiralty MRT station forming Sembawang West SMC in 2025.

== Future plans ==
According to the Urban Redevelopment Authority and its Master Plan for the North Region, the Woodlands Regional Centre is set to become the "Northern Gateway" of Singapore. Featuring some 700,000 m^{2} of new commercial space and more than 100 hectares of land that will be developed, the growth of the Woodlands Regional Centre will anchor the development of the North Coast Innovation Corridor. More commercial and shopping options will progressively be made available in the Woodlands Central, with a future pedestrian mall running through the heart of the district. As a significant employment cluster, the Woodlands North Coast will bring jobs and commercial opportunities closer to home for residents of the North Region. A new waterfront park will be built to connect the two districts of Woodlands Central and Woodlands North Coast. More park connectors and cycling paths will be built to connect to the 150 km Round Island Route and Rail Corridor.

Woodlands North is also involved in the construction of the Rapid Transit System (RTS) Link, which runs to Bukit Chagar, Johor Bahru

== See also ==
- Woodlands Train Checkpoint
- Places in Singapore
