= Marsiling MRT station =

Mass Rapid Transit station in Singapore

Marsiling NS8 马西岭 மார்சிலிங்
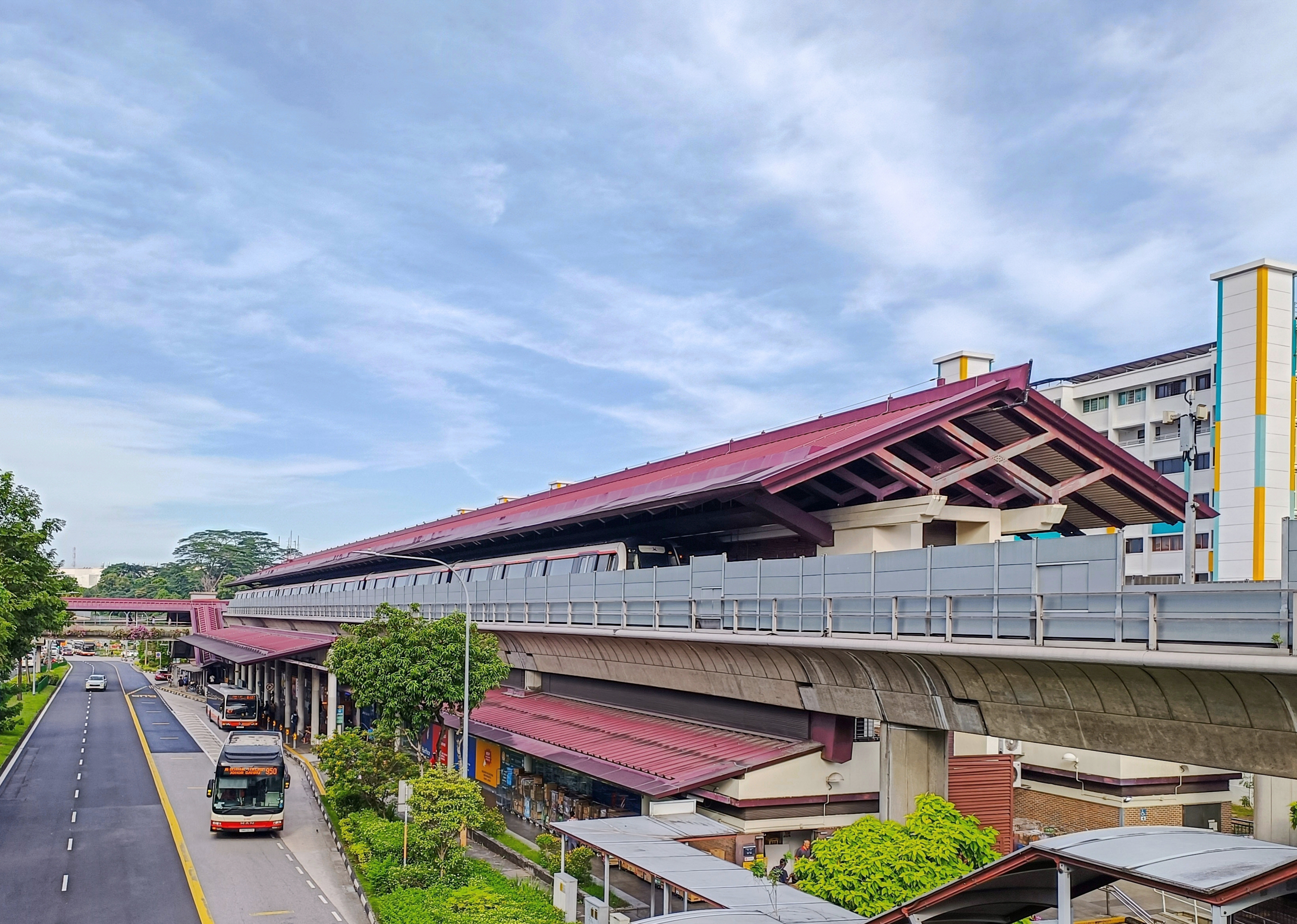
- Exterior of Marsiling MRT station

General information
- Location: 71 Woodlands Avenue 3 Singapore 739044
- Coordinates: 1°25′57.49″N 103°46′27.42″E
- System: Mass Rapid Transit (MRT) station
- Operator: SMRT Trains Ltd (SMRT Corporation)
- Line: North–South Line
- Platforms: 2 (1 island platform)
- Tracks: 2
- Connections: Bus, Taxi

Construction
- Structure type: Elevated
- Platform levels: 1
- Parking: Yes (External)
- Cycle facilities: Yes
- Accessible: Yes

History
- Opened: 10 February 1996; 30 years ago
- Former names: Woodlands West

Passengers
- June 2024: 19,854 per day

Services
Preceding station	Mass Rapid Transit	Following station
Kranji towards Jurong East	North–South Line	Woodlands towards Marina South Pier
Track layout
Location
- Location within Singapore Rail

Marsiling MRT station is an above-ground Mass Rapid Transit (MRT) station on the North–South Line (NSL) in Marsiling, Woodlands, Singapore. Operated by SMRT Trains, the station serves various nearby landmarks such as Marsiling Primary and Secondary schools and Fuchun Primary and Secondary Schools.

The station was first announced as Woodlands West in February 1991, where it would be built as part of the Woodlands extension of the NSL. It was renamed to Marsiling in November. Construction for Marsiling began by July 1993 and completed in October 1994. Marsiling station opened on 10 February 1996. Half-height platform screen doors and high-volume low-speed fans were installed by August 2011 and the first quarter of 2013, respectively.

Like most stations on the Woodlands extension, an extension of the NSL to Choa Chu Kang, it has a Kampong-style roof and a colour scheme designed to blend in with its surroundings. The station also has a privacy barrier as it is close to residential flats.

== History ==
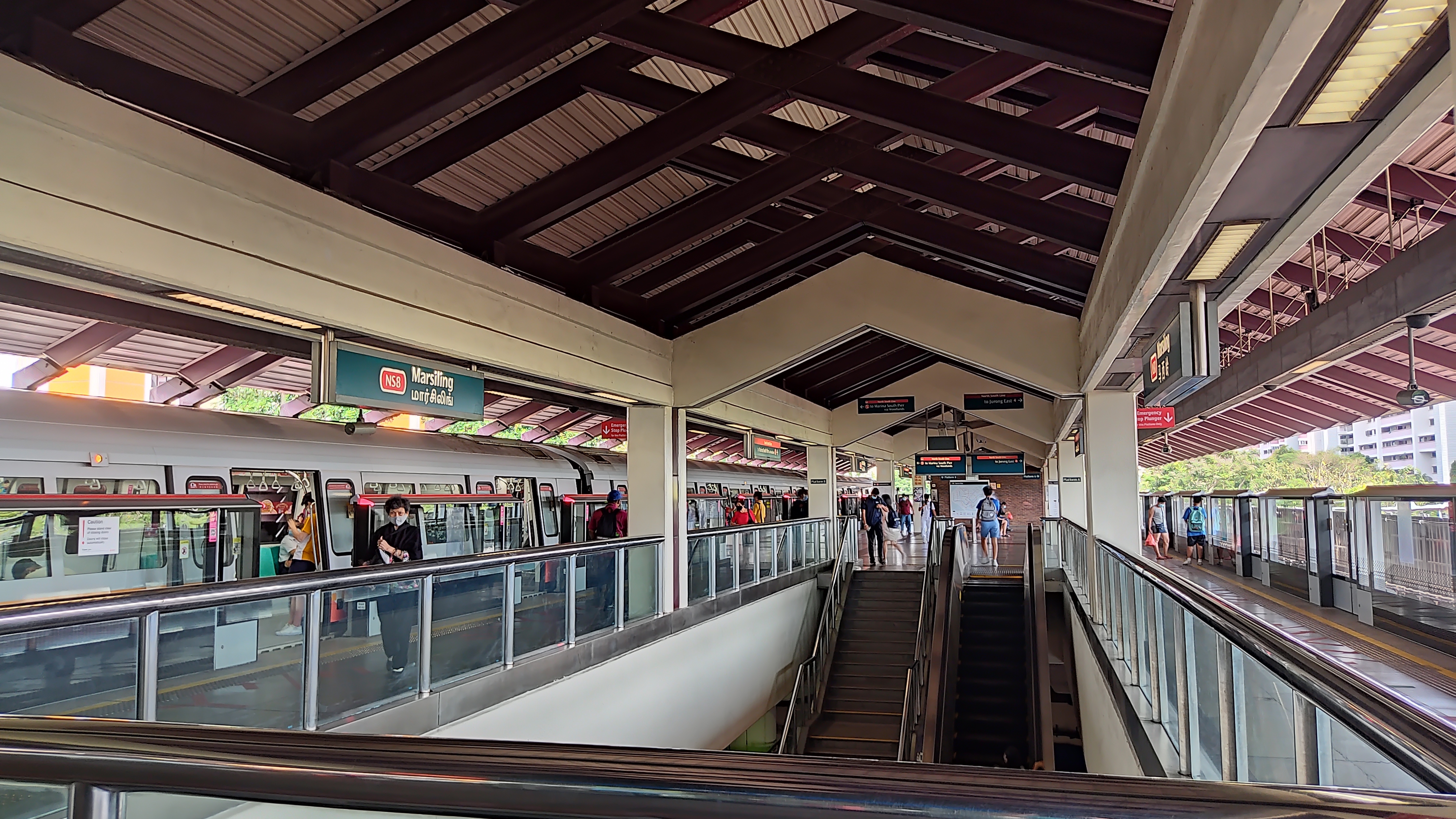
Marsiling MRT platforms

The Mass Rapid Transit Corporation (MRTC) first oulined plans for the Woodlands MRT line in March 1988, which was envisioned to connect Yishun and Choa Chu Kang stations via Woodlands. In February 1991, the MRTC announced that the extension, called the Woodlands extension, would start construction by the end of the year, as well as connect Yishun and Choa Chu Kang stations together through Woodlands. Six stations were planned to be built, with Woodlands West as one of them.

Eight consultants, which consisted of joint ventures, were considered for the extension's architectural and engineering works by April, with Parson Brinckerhoff along with SAA partnership and KPK Quantity Surveyors appointed as the design consultants by the MRTC in July. After consulting the Housing Board, the Street Naming Committee, and local politicians in Woodlands, Woodlands West was renamed to Marsiling in November. In December 1992, the contract for Marsiling station's construction was awarded to Hyundai Engineering and Koon Construction for S$233.1 million (1992) (US$143.1 million). By July 1993, piling works for Marsiling were in progress, with structural works completed in October 1994. As announced in January 1996 by Communications Minister Mah Bow Tan, Marsiling opened on 10 February 1996 along with other stations on the Woodlands extension. Prior to the opening, an open house for the Woodlands extension station was held on 4 February.

Following a rise in track intrusions as well as commuters slipping when rushing for the train, the Land Transport Authority (LTA) and SMRT decided to install half-height platform screen doors (PSD), where it was expected for the works to be completed by 2012. After several tests at different stations, the PSDs were expected to be installed in Marsiling by 2012, with works starting by August 2011. The works were completed in March 2012. Marsiling was also installed with high-volume low-speed fans by the first quarter of 2013.

== Details ==
Marsiling station is on the NSL with the station number of NS8, situated between Kranji and Woodlands stations. When it opened, it had the station number of N17 before being changed to its current station number in August 2001 as a part of a system-wide campaign to cater to the expanding MRT System. As a part of the NSL, the station is operated by SMRT Corporation. Like other stations on the Woodlands extension, Marsiling is elevated. The station mostly operates between 5:40 am and 12:58 am from Monday to Sundays and on public holidays. Train frequencies vary from 2–5 minutes during peak hours to an average of 5 minutes for off peak hours. The station is also mostly wheelchair accessible and has bicycle facilities.

Marsiling station runs alongside Woodlands Avenue 3 and has four exits serving surrounding amenities, mainly schools such as Marsiling Primary and Secondary Schools and Fuchun Primary School, as well as other landmarks like the Woodlands Polyclinic and the Marsiling–Yew Tee Town Council's main office.

Like most other stations on the Woodlands extension, Marsiling has a Kampong-style roof and a colour scheme designed to blend with its surroundings. Its platform is also bigger compared to previous stations as its electrical maintenance room was moved down to the concourse. The station's bus bays are longer than bus bays at previous stations, measuring 36 metres (118 ft) long. Similarly, its commercial space is larger than previous stations, with the MRTC believing that businesses would move-in due to the station's location, existing commercial space already occupied in other stations, and the expected influx of people moving to Woodlands and Sembawang. Due to the station's proximity to neighbouring Housing and Development Board apartment blocks, a louvre-like privacy screen was installed along the tracks at the side of the station facing these apartment blocks for privacy, the only MRT station then to have this feature.
