= Admiralty MRT station =

Mass Rapid Transit station in Singapore

Admiralty NS10 海军部 அட்மிரல்ட்டி
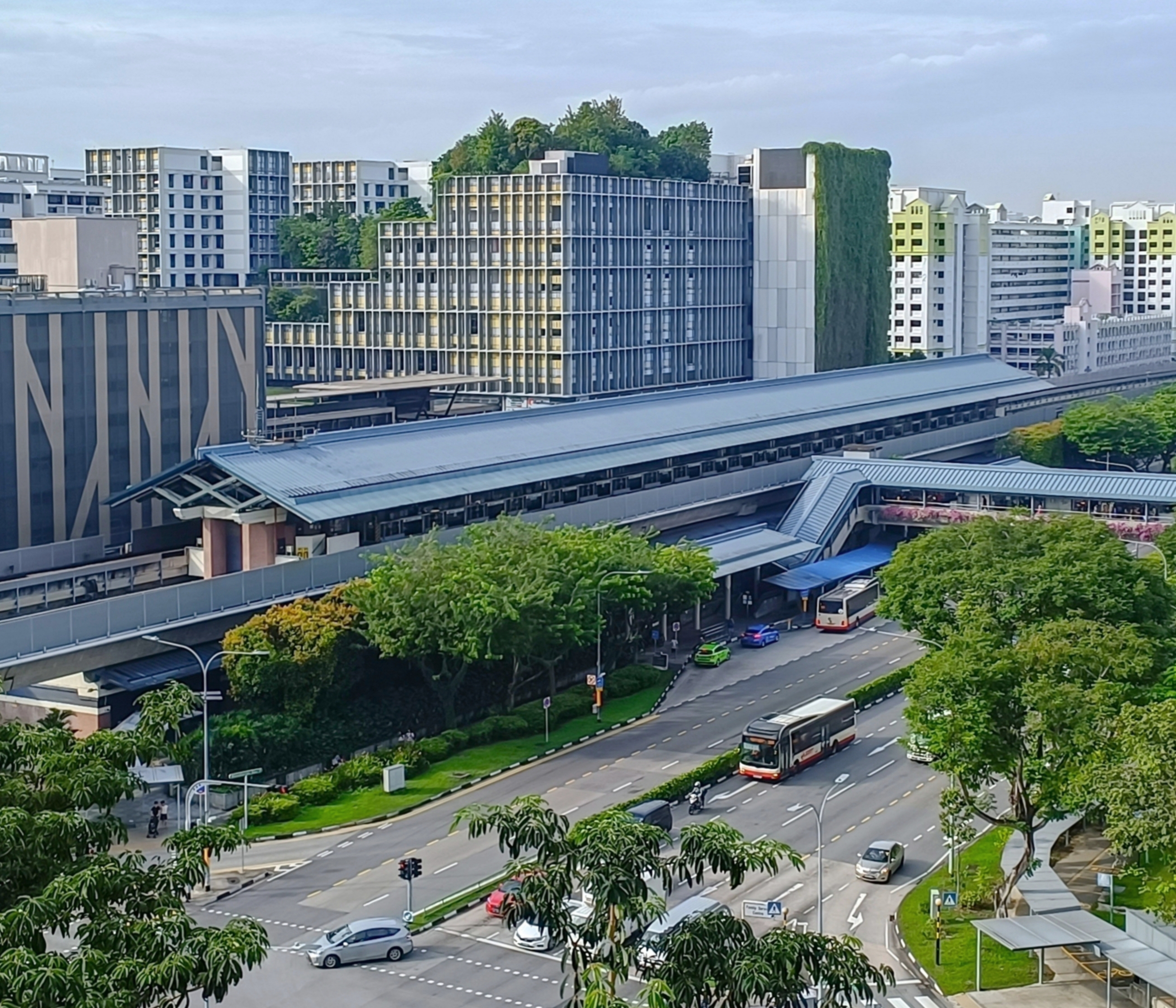
- Exterior of Admiralty MRT station

General information
- Location: 70 Woodlands Avenue 7, Singapore 738344
- Coordinates: 01°26′26.48″N 103°48′03.36″E
- System: Mass Rapid Transit (MRT) station
- Owner: Land Transport Authority
- Operator: SMRT Trains
- Line: North–South Line
- Platforms: 2 (1 island platform)
- Tracks: 2
- Connections: Bus, Taxi

Construction
- Structure type: Elevated
- Platform levels: 1
- Parking: Yes (Kampung Admiralty, Admiralty Place)
- Cycle facilities: Yes
- Accessible: Yes

Other information
- Station code: ADM

History
- Opened: 10 February 1996; 30 years ago
- Former names: Woodlands East

Passengers
- June 2024: 38,020 per day

Services
Preceding station	Mass Rapid Transit	Following station
Woodlands towards Jurong East	North–South Line	Sembawang towards Marina South Pier
Track layout
Location
- Location within Singapore Rail

Admiralty MRT station is an elevated Mass Rapid Transit (MRT) station on the North–South Line (NSL) in Woodlands, Singapore. Operated by SMRT Corporation, the station serves several nearby schools and landmarks such as Admiralty Place, Kampung Admiralty, and Woodlands Neighbourhood Police Centre. Like most stations on the Woodlands extension, it has a kampong-style roof and a colour scheme designed to blend in with its surroundings.

The station was first announced as Woodlands East in February 1991, where it would be built as part of the Woodlands extension of the NSL. It was renamed to Admiralty in November. Construction for the station began by July 1993 and completed in October 1994. Admiralty station opened on 10 February 1996. Accessibility enhancements were completed in July 2011, and additional bicycle parking facilities were installed in October 2012. Half-height platform screen doors and high-volume low-speed fans were installed by August 2011 and the first quarter of 2013, respectively.

== History ==
Whilst the Mass Rapid Transit (MRT) system was halfway through construction, plans for an extension of the North–South Line (NSL) from Yishun to Woodlands were conceptualised by the Mass Rapid Transit Corporation (MRTC) in March 1988, with a study carried out two months ago to determine the viability of the extension. In February 1991, the MRTC announced that the extension, called the Woodlands extension, would start construction by the end of the year, and connect Yishun and Choa Chu Kang stations together through Woodlands. Six stations were planned to be built, with Woodlands East as one of them.

Eight consultants, which consisted of joint ventures between local and foreign companies, were considered for the extension's architectural and engineering works by April. Parson Brinckerhoff, in association with SAA partnership and KPK Quantity Surveyors, was appointed by the MRTC as the design consultants. After consulting various groups, Woodlands East was renamed to Admiralty in November. In December 1992, the contract for Admiralty station's construction was awarded to Hyundai Engineering and Koon Construction for S$233.1 million (1992) (US$143.1 million). By July 1993, piling works for Admiralty were in progress, with structural works completed in October 1994. As announced in January 1996 by then-Communications Minister Mah Bow Tan, Admiralty, along with other stations on the Woodlands extension, were opened on 10 February 1996. Prior to the opening, an open house for the Woodlands extension station was held on 4 February.

In 2008, the Land Transport Authority (LTA) announced an accessibility enhancement programme for ten stations, including Admiralty. The programme included adding ramps, covered linkways, and taxi stands with wheelchair access. It was completed by July 2011 at a cost of S$116 million (US$92.23 million). Admiralty station was part of the first batch of ten stations announced in 2010 to have additional bicycle parking facilities as a response to the growing demand of bicycle parking spots. The installation was completed in October 2012.

Following a rise in track intrusions as well as commuters slipping when rushing for the train, the LTA and SMRT decided to install half-height platform screen doors (PSD), where it was expected for the works to be completed by 2012. After several tests at different stations, the PSDs were expected to be installed in Admiralty by 2012, with works starting by August 2011. The works were completed in March 2012. High-volume low-speed fans were installed in Admiralty station in the first quarter of 2013.

== Station details ==
Admiralty station is on the NSL with station number NS10 and is situated between Woodlands and Sembawang stations. When it opened, it had the station number of N15 before being changed to its current station number in August 2001 as a part of a system-wide campaign to cater to the expanding MRT System. As a part of the NSL, the station is operated by SMRT Corporation. Like other stations on the Woodlands extension, Admiralty is elevated. The station mostly operates between 5:29 am and 12:53 am from Monday to Sundays and on public holidays. Train frequencies vary from 2–5 minutes during peak hours to an average of 5 minutes for off peak hours. The station is also mostly wheelchair accessible and has bicycle facilities.

Admiralty station is located along Woodlands Avenue 7 and serves several nearby landmarks such as Admiralty Place, Kampung Admiralty, and Woodlands Neighbourhood Police Centre. It also serves several nearby schools such as Admiralty Primary School, Greenwood Primary School, and Woodlands Ring Secondary School.

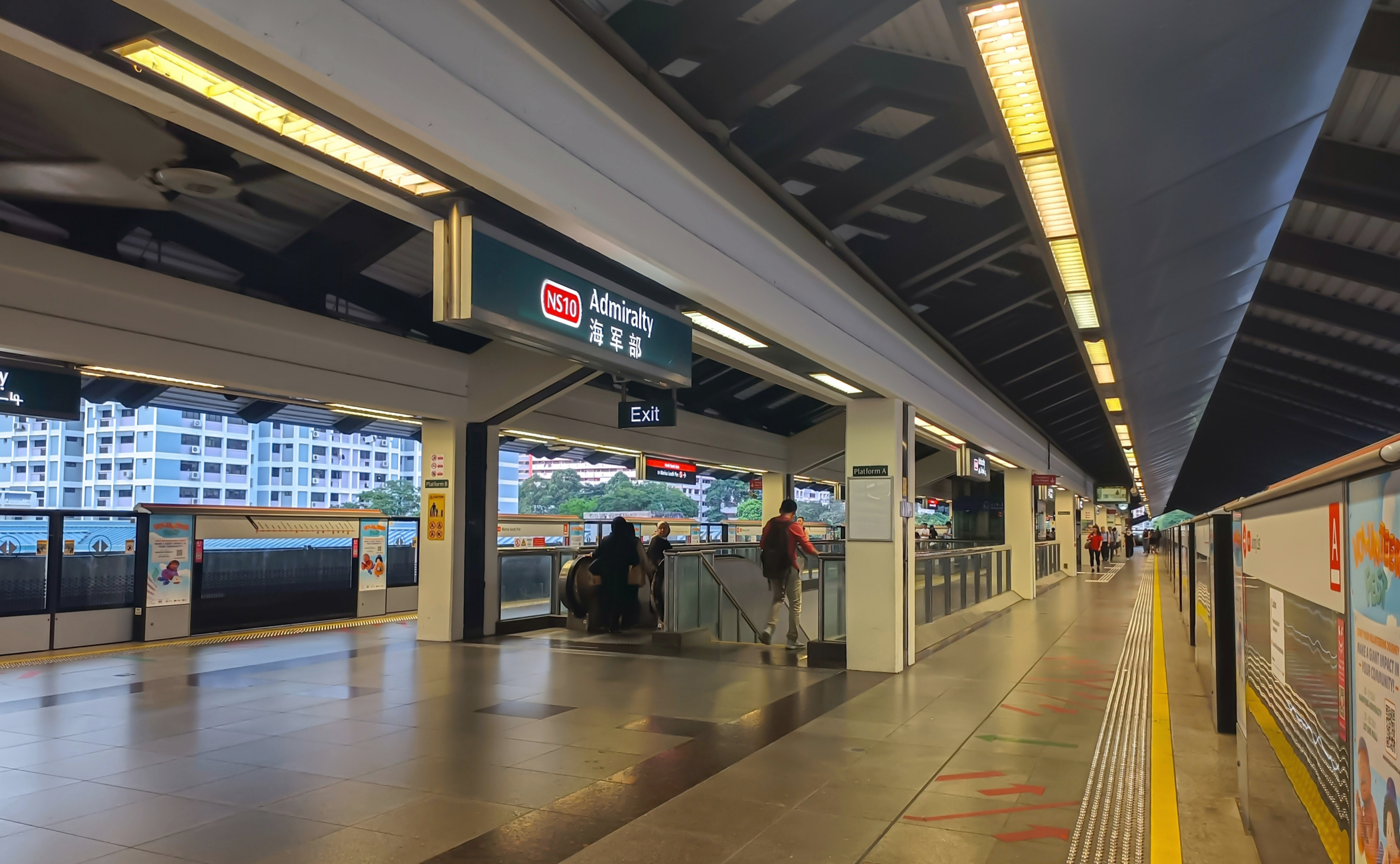
Platform level of the station

Like most other stations on the Woodlands extension, Admiralty has a kampong-style roof and a colour scheme designed to blend with its surroundings. Its platform is also bigger compared to previous stations as its electrical maintenance room was moved down to the concourse. The station's bus bays are longer than bus bays at previous stations, measuring 36 metres (118 ft) long. Similarly, its commercial space is larger than previous stations as the MRTC considered that businesses would move-in due to the station's location, existing commercial space already occupied in other stations, and the expected influx of people moving to Woodlands and Sembawang.
