= Causeway Point =

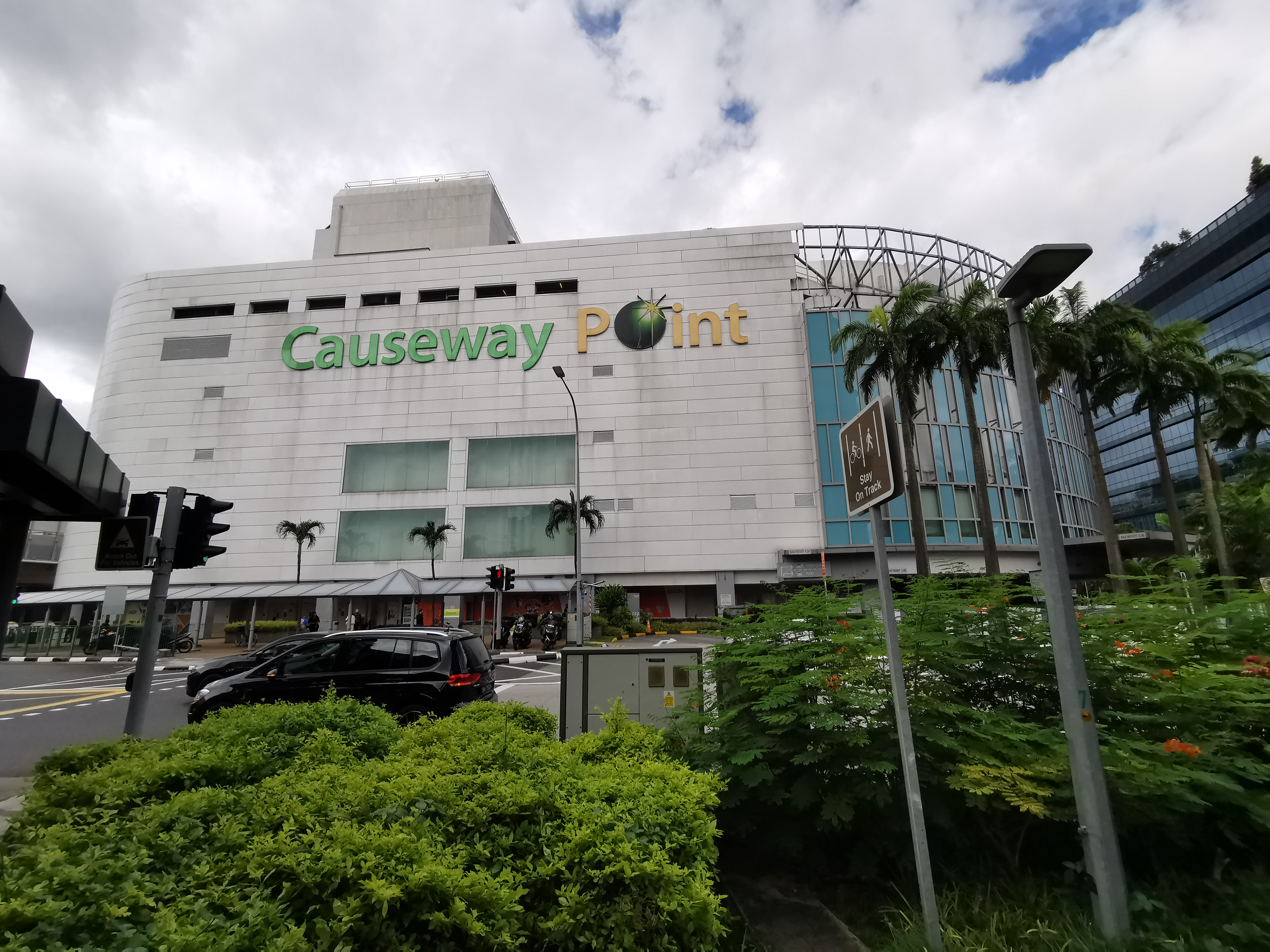
- Causeway Point
- Location: Woodlands, Singapore
- Coordinates: 1°26′10″N 103°47′9″E
- Address: 1 Woodlands Square, Singapore 738099
- Opened: 17 October 1998; 28 years ago (Soft opening); 30 May 1999; 27 years ago (Official opening)
- Developer: Frasers Centrepoint
- Owner: Frasers Property
- Num. of stores: 250
- Num. of anchor tenants: 8
- Floor area: 420,000 square feet (39,000 m^{2})
- Floors: 9
- Public transit: NS9 TE2 Woodlands; Woodlands Bus Interchange
- Website: www.causewaypoint.com.sg

Causeway Point is the seventh largest suburban shopping mall in Singapore. It is operated by Frasers Property. Causeway Point is located in the town centre of Woodlands, a town in the north of Singapore. Completed in 1998, it is located beside the Woodlands MRT station and the underground Woodlands Bus Interchange. It has 250 retail outlets spread over five floors and a basement.

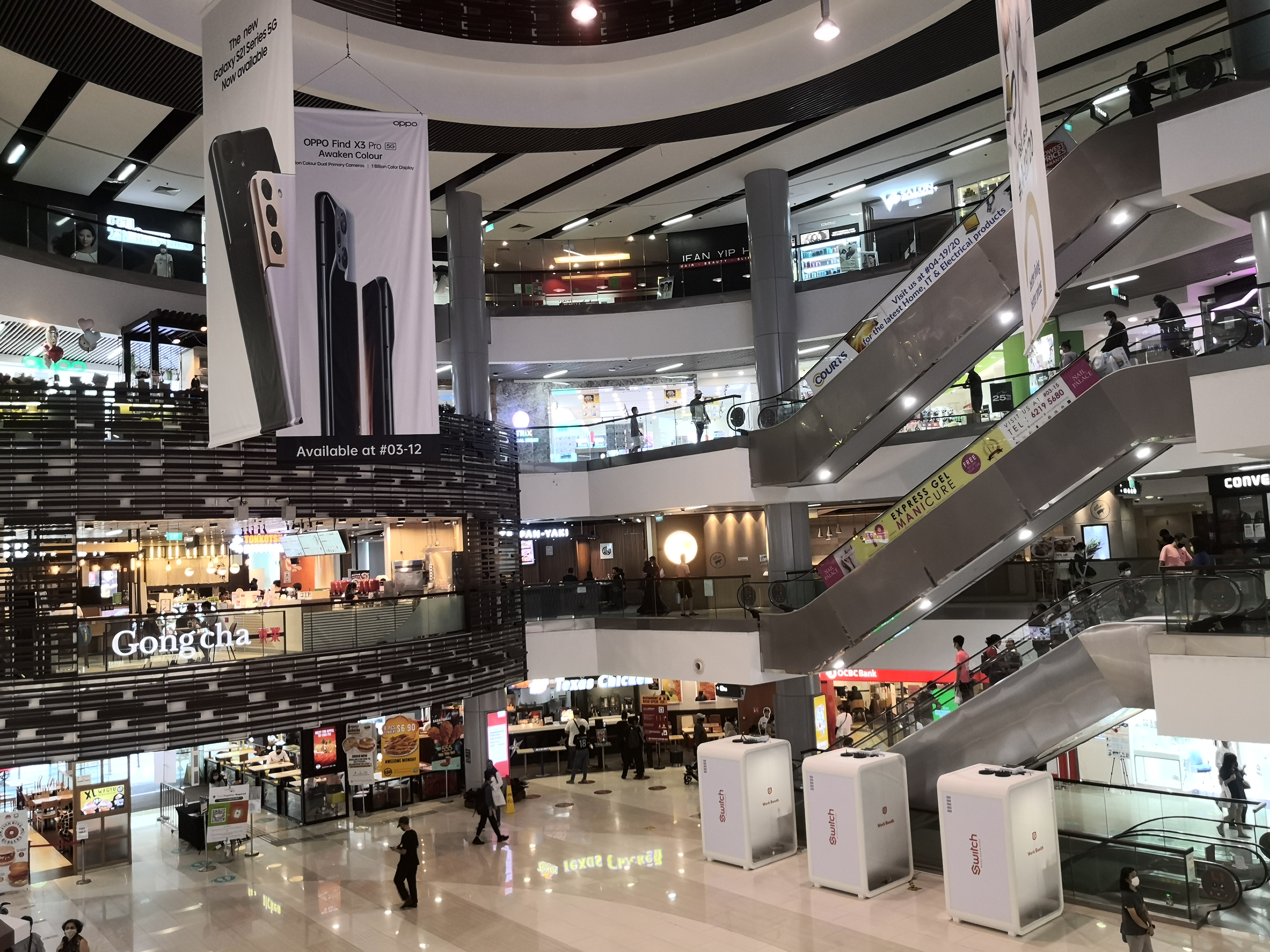
Interior of Causeway Point

== History ==
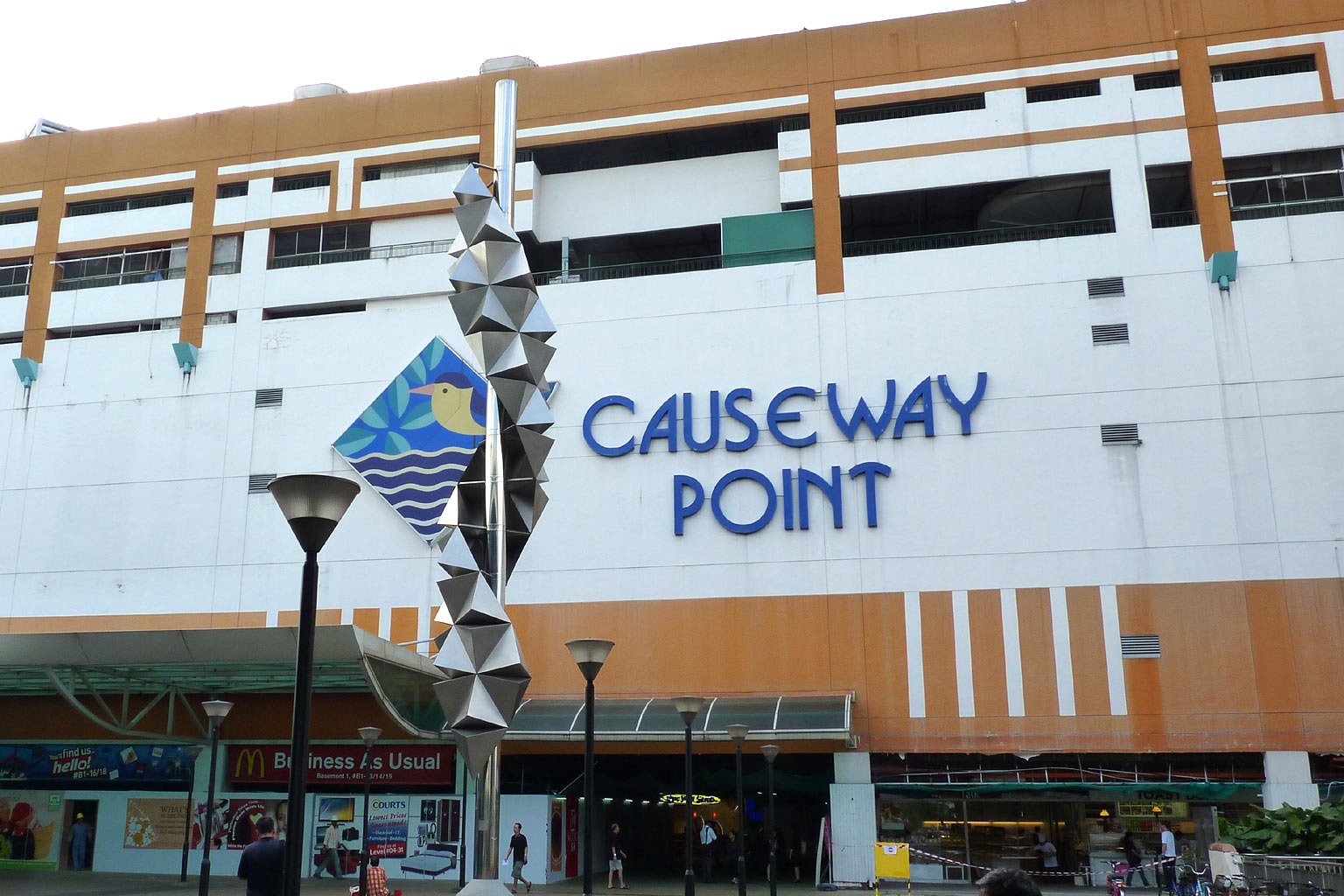
Causeway Point in 2011

In 1995, Centrepoint Properties Limited (CPL) bidded $309 million for a plot of land in Woodlands Town Centre and won the bid. The site was zoned commercial and can be used for a mix of retail, entertainment, food and beverage and office space but CPL decided to build an entertainment and shopping centre, Causeway Point.

Causeway Point was estimated by CPL to cost the company $500 million to build while The Business Times, a Singapore newspaper, estimated the cost to be at $550 million.

Causeway Point was completed in November 1998 as the first major shopping mall to open in Woodlands, therefore officially opened on 30 May 1999. The mall opened with a 10 screen cineplex operated by Studio Cinemas but Studio Cinemas was evicted after it was unable to pay the rent. Cathay Organisation took over the cineplex, and was reduced to 7 screens in 2001. The mall also used to have John Little and Metro department stores, a Cold Storage supermarket, Courts (a consumer electronics and furniture retailer) and more than 250 specialty shops.

In late 2010, Causeway Point underwent a $72 million facelift lasting 30 months. These renovation works were aimed to increase net property income by 22 per cent to $51.5 million. During these renovation works, it added a dry playground at Level 2 and a wet playground at Level 7. The dry playground was demolished in late 2019. The main food court was relocated from Level 5 to Level 4 as part of its tenant remixing works. John Little vacated the mall shortly before renovation works commenced and was replaced by newer stores. In September 2021, Cotton On merged the former Cotton On Kids stores and Rubi Shoes store, the latter was replaced by G2000. On 25 May 2024, Cotton On closed down after 14 years of operation at the mall. Also, Cathay Cineplexes shut down operations on 30 August 2025 after 27 years due to multiple factors, which is lease expiry, rental arrears, lower demand due to streaming services and financial issues. It was the longest Cathay Cineplexes cinema in operation.

Major tenants include FairPrice Finest, Metro, Food Republic, Bagus by Kopitiam, Courts, G2000, Sephora, and Uniqlo.

== See also ==
- List of shopping malls in Singapore
- Northpoint City
- Sun Plaza
