= Woodlands MRT station =

Mass Rapid Transit station in Singapore

Woodlands NS9 TE2 兀兰 ஊட்லண்ட்ஸ்
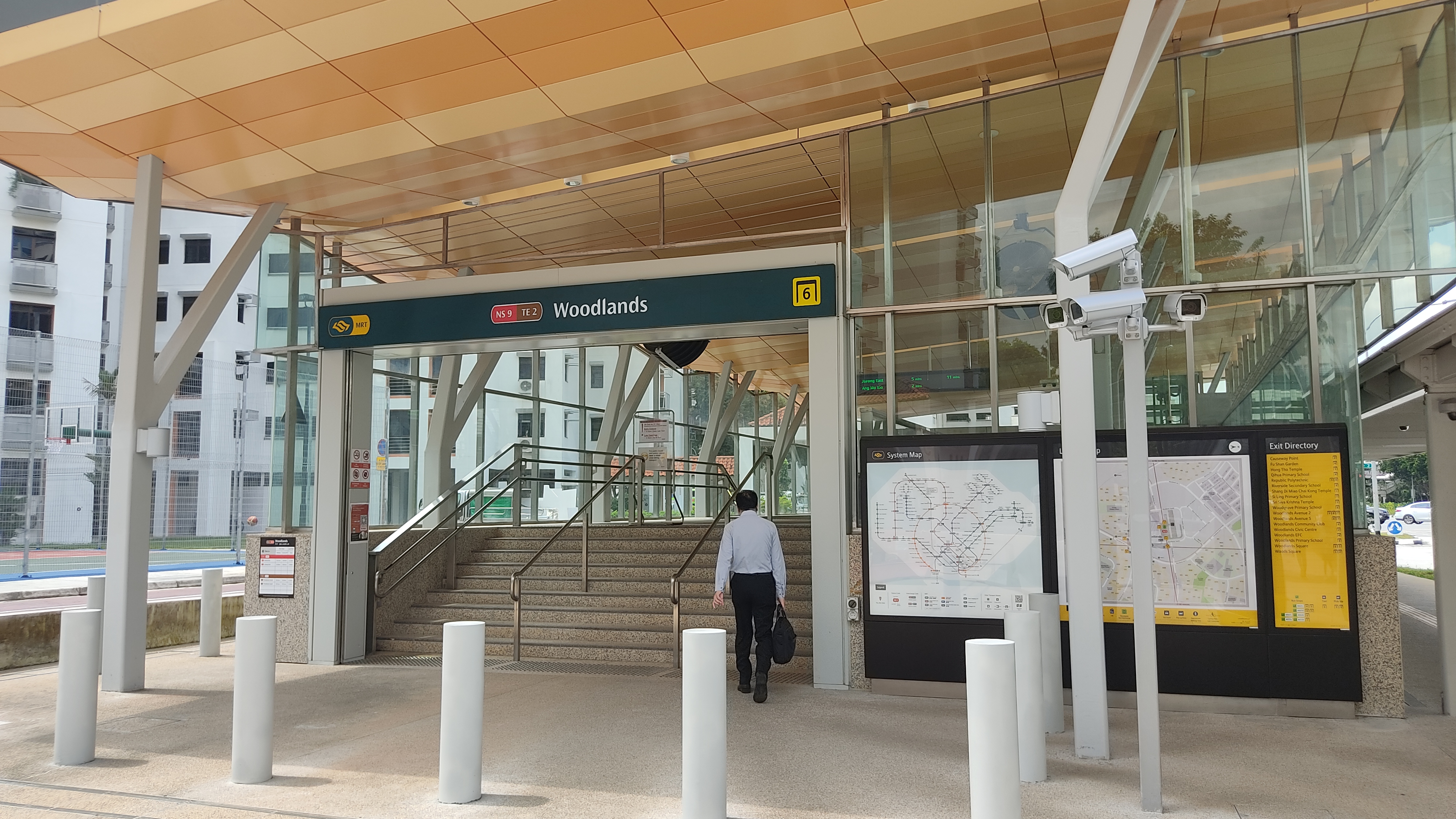
- Exit 6 of Woodlands station

General information
- Location: 30 Woodlands Avenue 2, Singapore 738343 (NSL); 11 Woodlands Square, Singapore 737736 (TEL)
- Coordinates: 01°26′13.54″N 103°47′11.34″E
- System: Mass Rapid Transit (MRT) interchange
- Owner: Land Transport Authority
- Operator: SMRT Trains
- Line: North–South Line Thomson–East Coast Line
- Platforms: 4 (2 island platforms)
- Tracks: 4
- Connections: Woodlands, Woodlands Temporary Bus Interchange, Taxi

Construction
- Structure type: Elevated (North South Line); Underground (Thomson–East Coast Line)
- Platform levels: 2
- Parking: Yes (Causeway Point, Woodlands Civic Centre, Woods Square)
- Cycle facilities: Yes
- Accessible: Yes

Other information
- Station code: WDL

History
- Opened: 10 February 1996; 30 years ago (North–South Line); 31 January 2020; 6 years ago (Thomson–East Coast Line)

Passengers
- June 2024: 51,051 per day

Services
Preceding station	Mass Rapid Transit	Following station
Marsiling towards Jurong East	North–South Line	Admiralty towards Marina South Pier
Woodlands North Terminus	Thomson–East Coast Line	Woodlands South towards Bayshore
Track layout
Location
- Location within Singapore Rail

Woodlands MRT station is a Mass Rapid Transit (MRT) interchange station on the North–South (NSL) and Thomson–East Coast (TEL) lines in Singapore. Located in Woodlands, the MRT station was the first to feature an underground bus interchange underneath the NSL station. The station is also integrated with surrounding developments, including Causeway Point and the Woodlands Civic Centre.

The NSL station was first announced in November 1991 as part of the Woodlands MRT extension. Completed on 10 February 1996, the elevated station has a circular, barrel-like roof with beige and green tiles. Min Chan's Faces II sculpture is displayed near the station.

With the opening of TEL Stage 1 on 31 January 2020, Woodlands station became an interchange station with the TEL. Designated as a Civil Defence Shelter, the TEL platforms have a brown, grey and green scheme designed to be spacious and well-lit. Terence Lin's The Day's Thoughts of a Homespun Journey is displayed on the walls of the TEL station.

== History ==
=== North–South Line ===
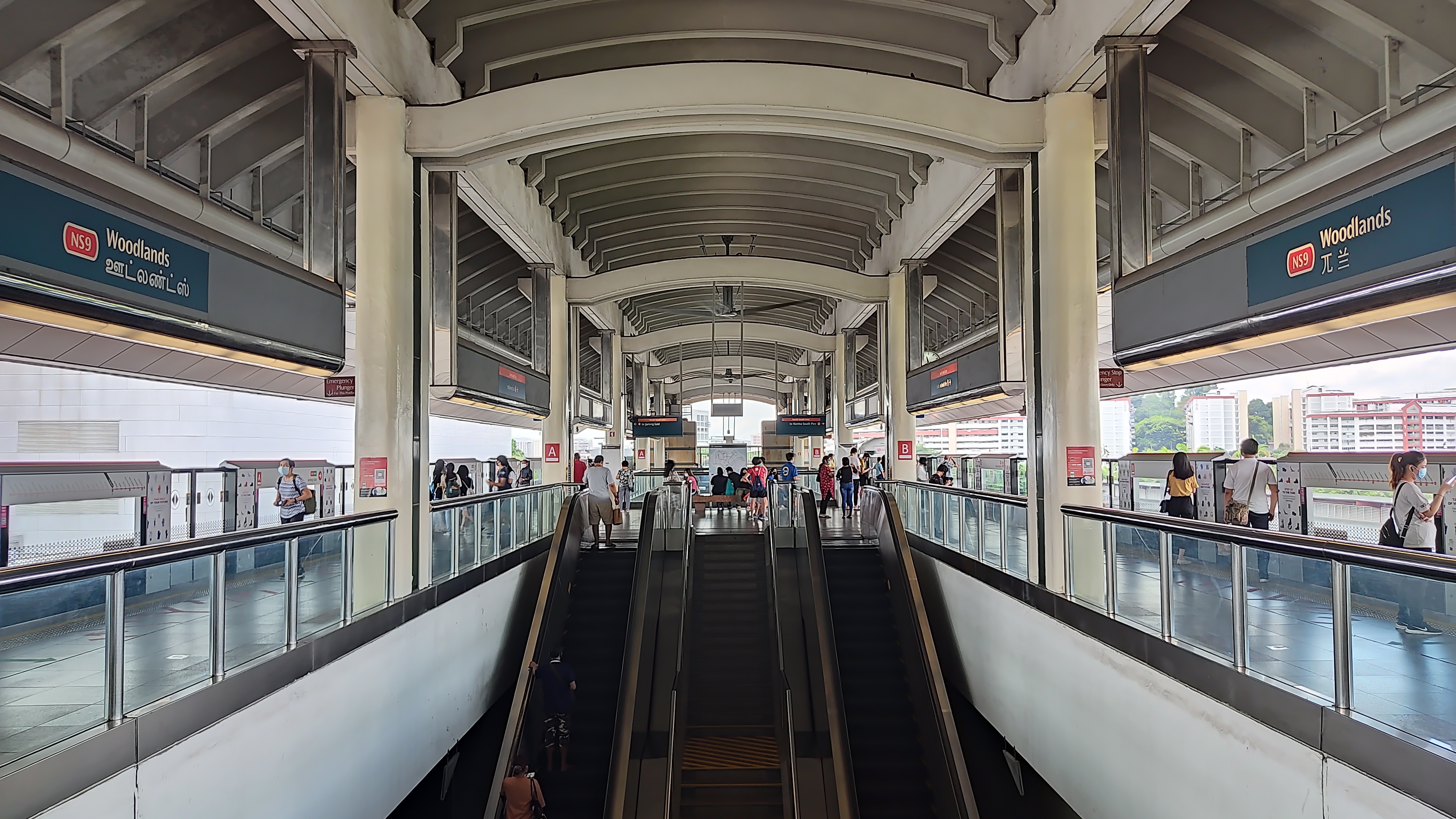
NSL platform

After the Branch line (from the Jurong East to Choa Chu Kang stations) opened in 1990, the government made plans for the Woodlands MRT line that would connect between Yishun and Choa Chu Kang stations. The station was among the six Woodlands line extension stations announced in November 1991. The contract for the construction of Woodlands station, along with the Marsiling, Admiralty and Sembawang stations, was awarded to a joint venture between Hyundai Engineering and Koon Construction and Transport Co in December 1992 at S$233.1 million (US$143.1 million). The contract included 8.7 kilometres (5.4 miles) of track work.

On 28 April 1995, then Communications Minister Mah Bow Tan made a visit to the station site, along with the Mass Rapid Transit Corporation (MRTC) chairman Wesley D'aranjo and Minister of State for Communications Goh Chee Wee. Mah made another visit during his inspection of the six MRT stations on 13 January 1996 when he announced the opening date of the Woodlands extension. The station opened on 10 February 1996 along with the other stations on the Woodlands Extension.

In 2012, half-height platform screen doors were installed at this station as part of the Land Transport Authority's (LTA) programme to improve safety in MRT stations. Between 2012 and 2013, high-volume low-speed fans were installed at this station to improve ventilation at the elevated station's platforms.

=== Thomson–East Coast Line ===
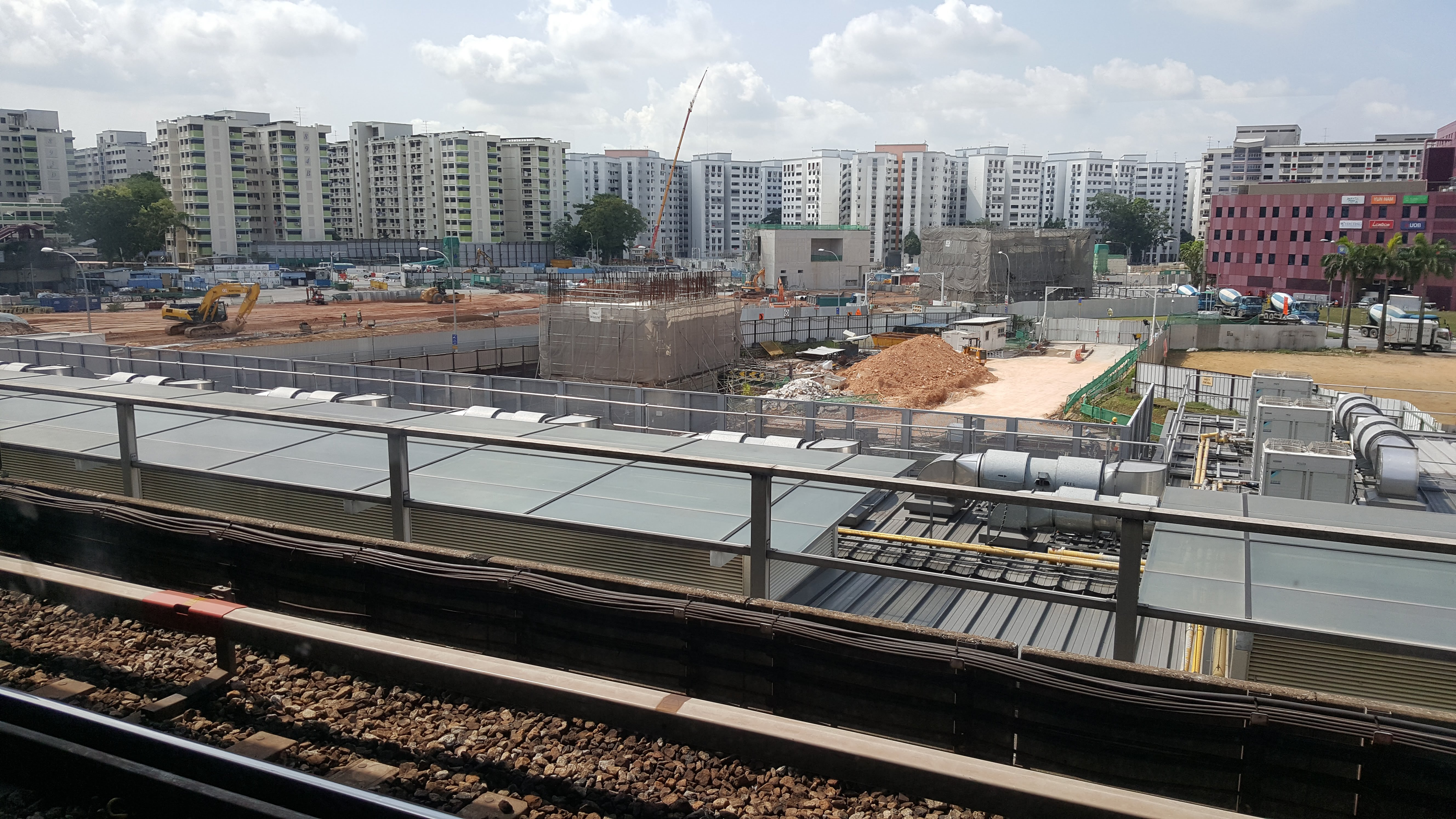
The TEL station during its construction in 2018

Woodlands station was first announced to interchange with the 22-station Thomson line (TSL) on 29 August 2012. Contract T203 for the design and construction of Woodlands Station was awarded to GS Engineering & Construction Corp at S$292 million (US$233.4 million) in October 2013. The contract includes the construction for the associated cut-and-cover tunnels. Earlier in July, another S$421 million (US$336.5 million) contract, for the construction of bored tunnels connecting from Woodlands Station to Mandai Depot via Woodlands South station, was awarded to Shanghai Tunnel Engineering Co. Ltd.

Construction of the TSL began with a groundbreaking ceremony held at the Woodlands station construction site on 27 June 2014. On 15 August 2014, the LTA further announced that TSL would merge with the Eastern Region line to form the Thomson–East Coast line (TEL). Woodlands station would be part of the proposed line. The station would be constructed as part of Phase 1 (TEL1), consisting of three stations from Woodlands North to Woodlands South. Construction was expected to be completed in 2019.

The TEL station was constructed near the operational NSL station with complex soil conditions. There were also future developments planned for the site. Arup, the consultant for TEL1, recommended the realignment of the northern end of the station. While allowing a shorter linkway for commuters transferring between the two lines, it avoided the risks of tunnelling under the live substations (which were relocated for the construction) powering the NSL station and the bus interchange.

The new alignment also minimised damage to the soil while allowing provisions for future developments. Rock blasting simulation was used to ensure a safe evacuation for the TEL station, with enhanced monitoring for vibrations of potentially affected structures. The Earth Retaining Stabilising Structure wall used for the TEL construction was kept to be reused for future basement evacuation, reducing future construction costs and further impact on the environment. The crossover tunnels, originally planned to be underneath a pedestrian bridge near the residential blocks, were relocated closer to the station. This relocation saved evacuation costs by about S$60 million (US$48 million) and minimised road traffic disruption and inconvenience to residents. The excavated space above the crossover tunnels was converted to a pedestrian retail link rather than backfilling it.

Two new linkways were constructed to connect the NSL and TEL along with the underground bus interchange. The NSL concourse was redesigned to avoid having to replace the four existing supporting structures at the area. The redesign allowed the load to be transferred to new supporting columns and piles. Another column was underpinned and removed for the construction of the direct linkway between NSL and TEL.

On 19 September 2019, it was announced by then Transport Minister Khaw Boon Wan that TEL1 will open before the end of January 2020. The LTA later announced in December that the TEL1 stations would be opened on 31 January 2020. Before the stations commenced operations on that day, an open house for the TEL 1 stations was held on 11 January 2020.

== Station details ==
=== Location ===
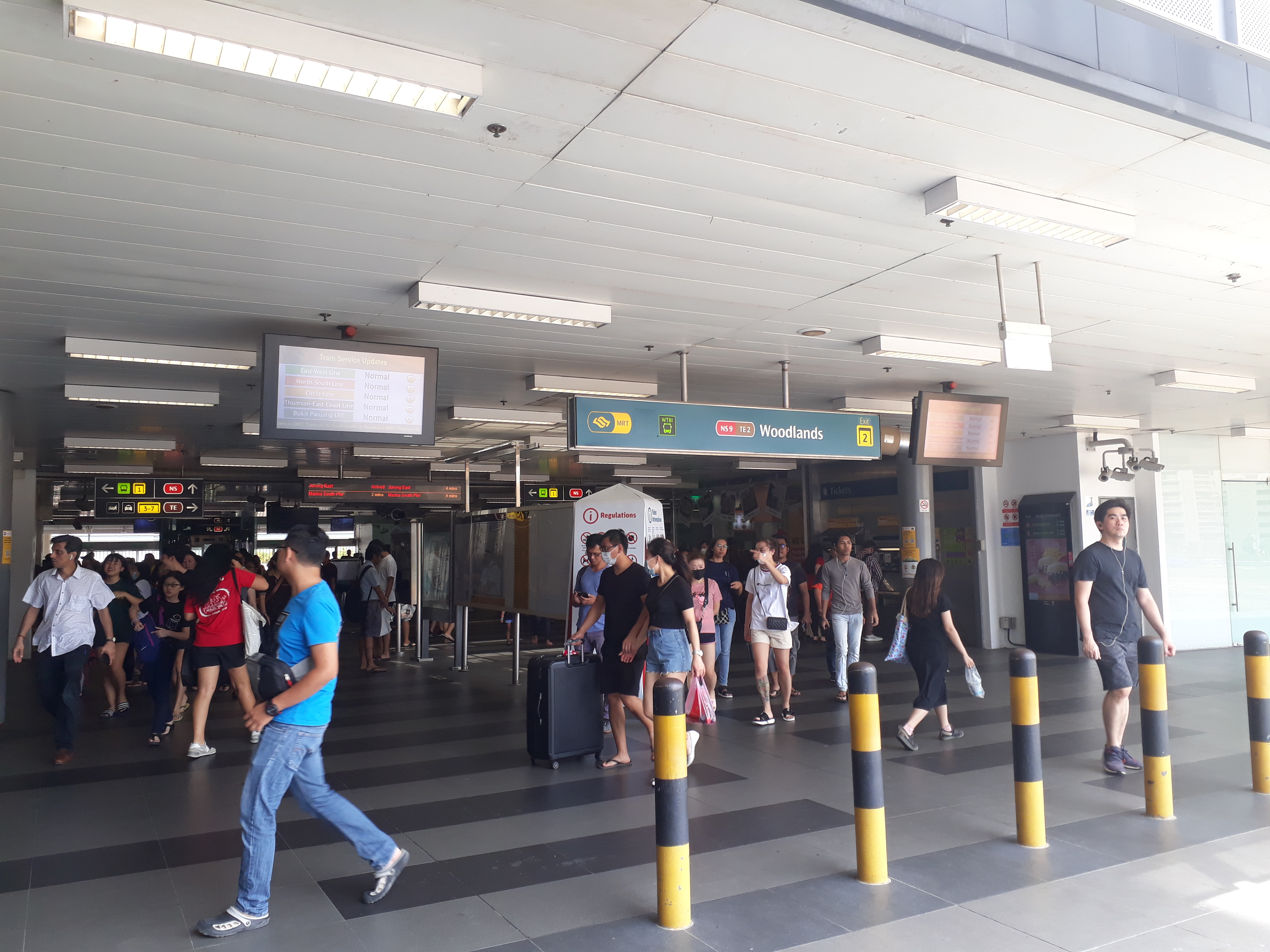
Exit 2 (formerly Exit A) of Woodlands station

Woodlands station, as the name suggests, is located in the Singapore residential town of Woodlands. The NSL station is on a 6 m (20 ft) hillock surrounded by Woodlands Square, while the TEL station is located between Woodlands Avenue 2 and Woodlands Square. The NSL station is directly above the Woodlands Integrated Transport Hub (previously Woodlands Regional Bus Interchange) and is beside the Woodlands Temporary Bus Interchange. Other surrounding developments include Causeway Point and Woods Square and schools such as Woodlands Primary School and Riverside Secondary School.

=== Services ===
Woodlands station is an interchange on the NSL and TEL. The official station code is NS9/TE2. On the NSL, the station is between the Marsiling and Admiralty stations. On the TEL, the station is between the Woodlands North and Woodlands South stations. NSL services have a frequency of 2 to 5 minutes, while TEL services have a frequency of 3 to 6 minutes.

=== Public artworks ===
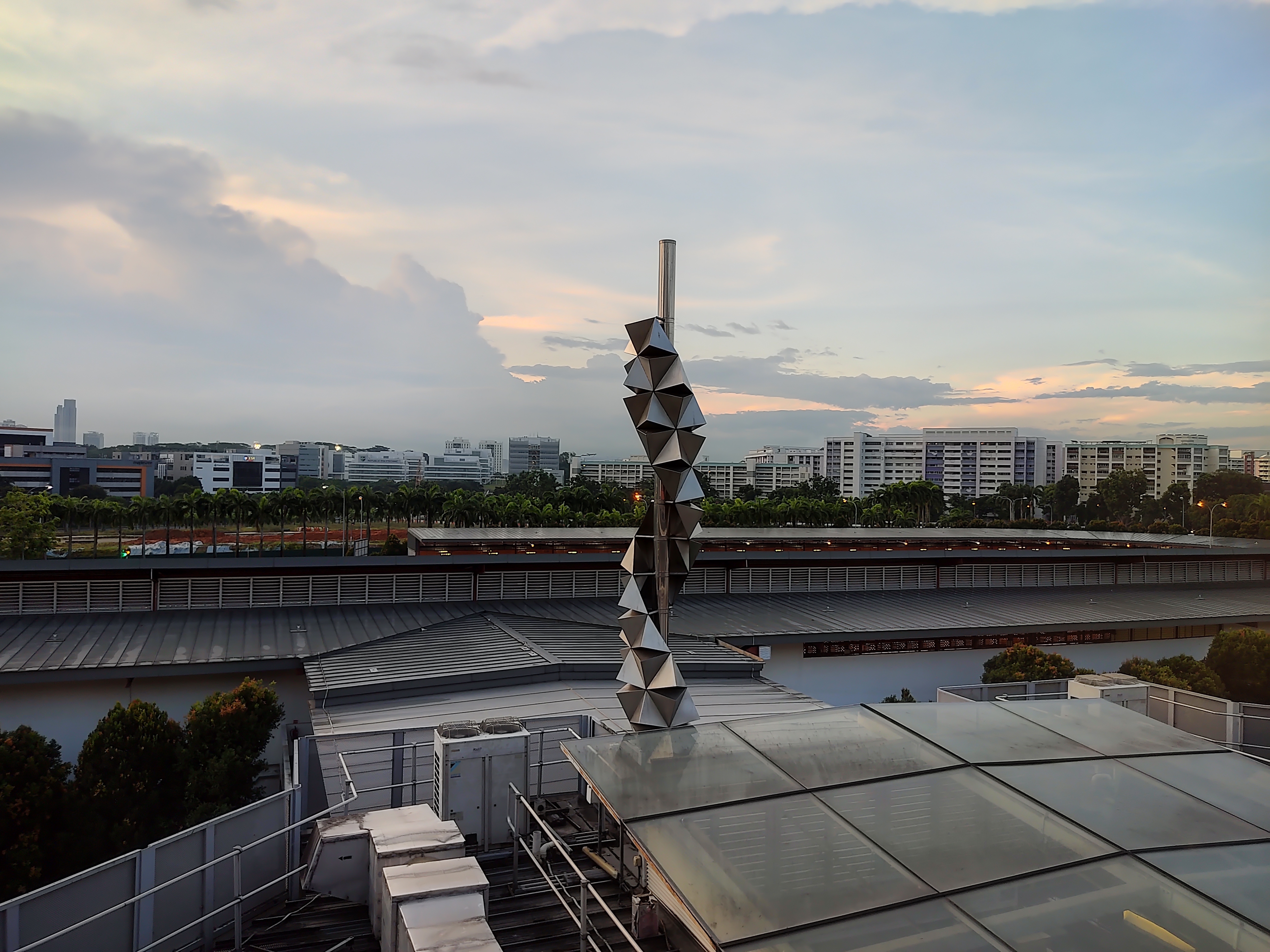
Faces II by Min Chen

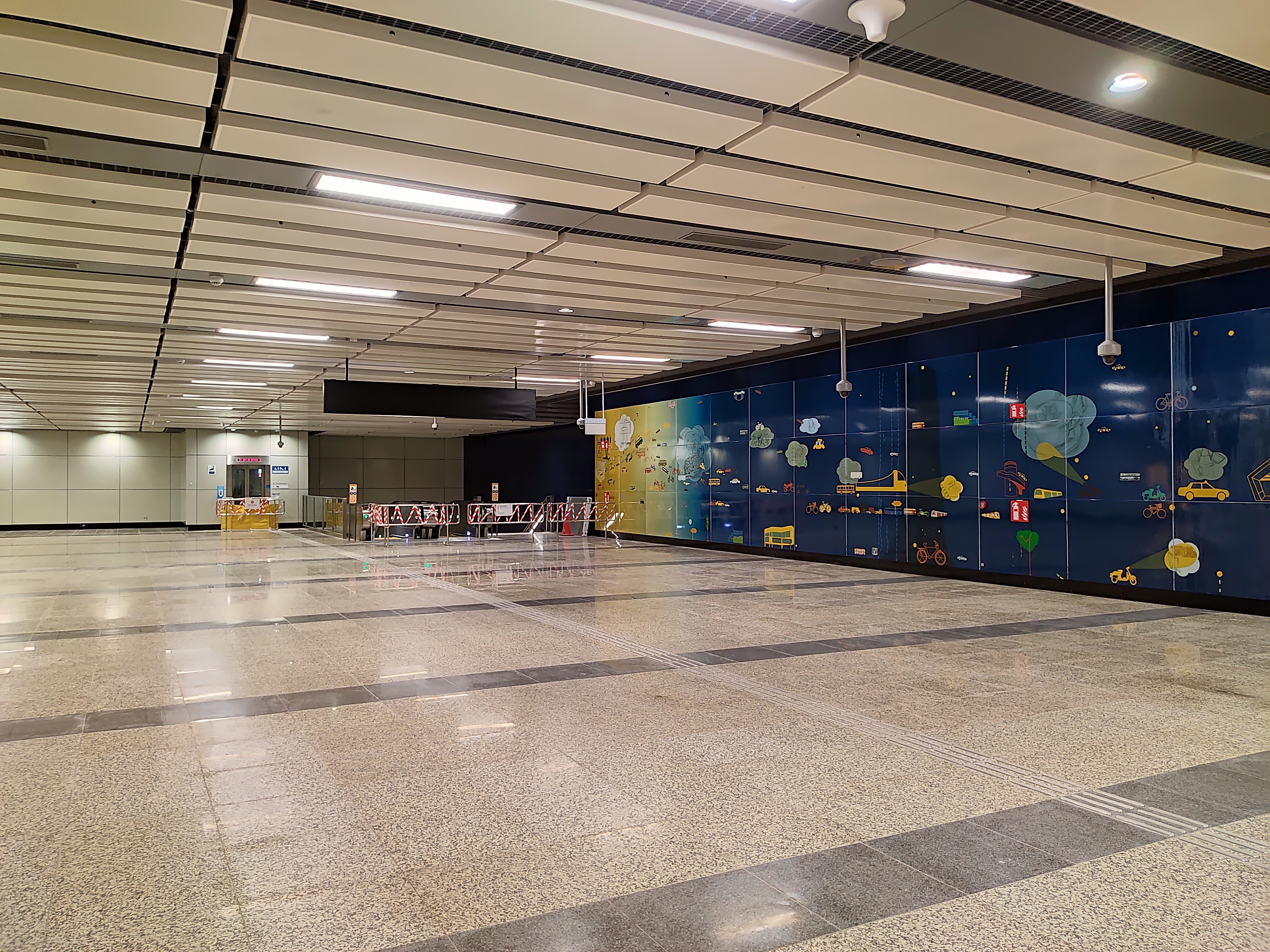
Part of the TEL artwork in the station

The two artworks in the station

A 15-metre (49 ft) high stainless steel by Min Chen is displayed at the NSL station. The sculpture, Faces II, is a spiral of triangular geometric surfaces, intended to represent the various expressions of people's faces. Selected among six submissions, the judges were impressed by the artist's ability to “incorporate a human feel” in a cubist style. The sculpture takes inspiration from origami, the Japanese art of paper folding. The judges hoped that the work would reflect Singapore's Asian background.

Terence Lin's The Day’s Thoughts Of A Homespun Journey Into The Night is displayed on two walls of the TEL station interior. The artwork contains illustrations of various public transport vehicles, with the commuters' thoughts and aspirations illuminated by the vehicles' headlights. Keeping to the theme of transit most associated with Woodlands, the artwork intends to illustrate the everyday commuting experiences in an imaginative way. Through the artwork, the artist hoped that people would be more aware of what they do in transit while reminding them of their own home.

In addition to the vehicles, other illustrations include those of various landmarks in Woodlands. Alluding to a homey experience, various fabric patterns were incorporated into the artwork. The two walls have a dark and light theme, alluding to the binary of day and night. These walls share a blend of colours at their ends, to reflect the transition from day to night. For further inspiration for the artwork, Lin collated his friends' experiences in Woodlands and had visited the neighbourhood to learn more about Woodlands. Lin hoped that commuters through the station would get to experience his artwork in a different way every time they pass through the station.

There is also a mural created by participants of the Movement for the Intellectually Disabled (MINDS) craft at the Woodlands Employment Centre. As part of the heritage-themed Comic Connect public display by SMRT, the mural shows the evolution of Woodlands and features local landmarks such as Kampung Fatimah (a former village), the Woodlands Town Centre, the Singapore-Johor Causeway, and the Woodlands Regional Centre (a collection of buildings including this station as well as the Woodlands Bus Interchange).

== Station design ==
=== NSL station ===
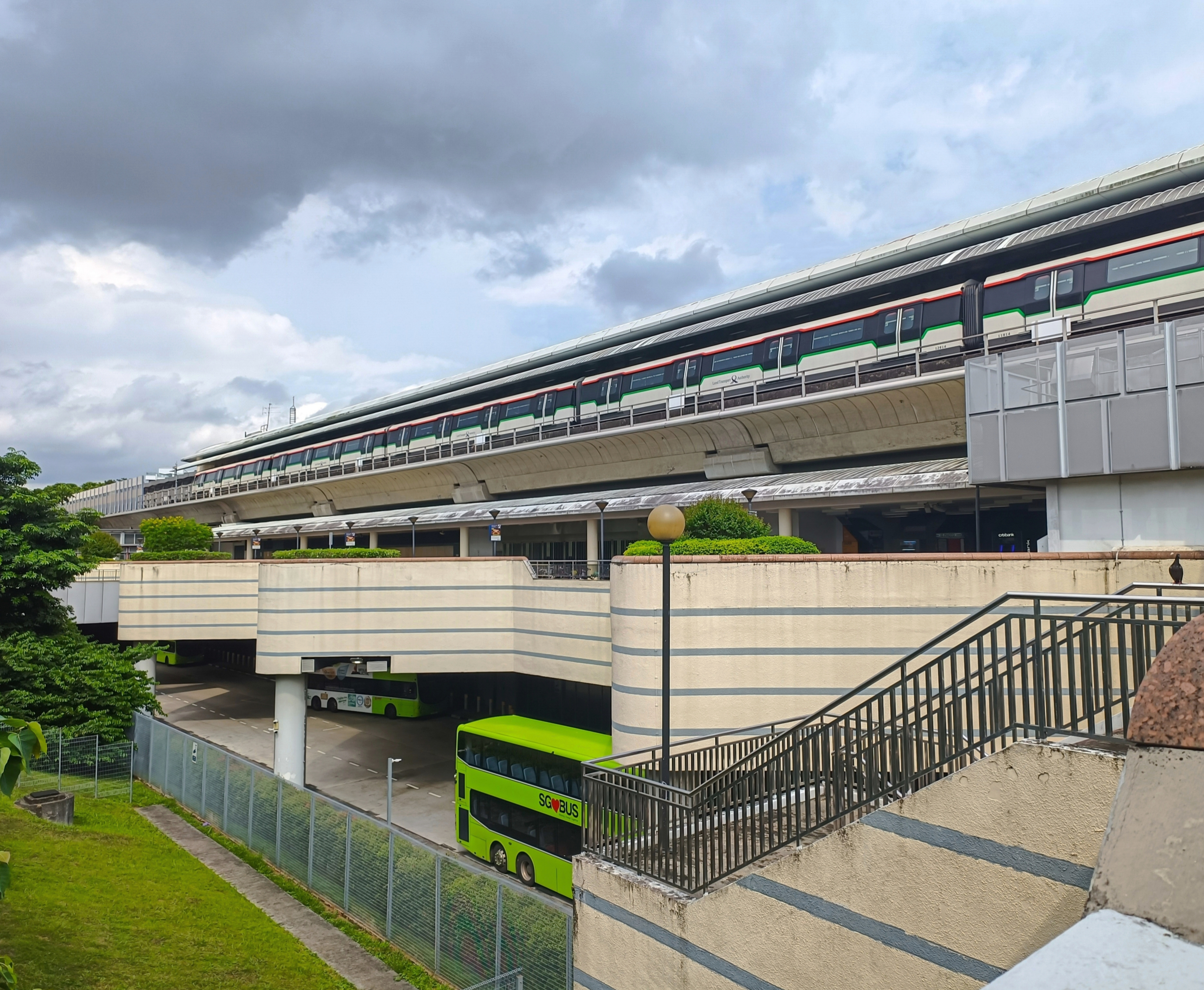
The station is directly above the bus interchange.

The NSL station was designed by Parsons Brinckerhoff and Mausell Consultants. Adopting a beige and green colour scheme, the station exterior has a modern outlook featuring a circular barrel-like roof (unlike the other Woodlands MRT extension stations). This was to ensure that the station would blend in with the surrounding future modern developments. Woodlands station is the first MRT station in Singapore to feature an underground bus interchange directly underneath it. In addition to the bus interchange, the station has at least 50 bicycle parking spaces and taxi stands, integrating the station with other transportation modes. The platforms are designed to be more spacious, with the electrical maintenance rooms relocated to the concourse level.

=== TEL station ===
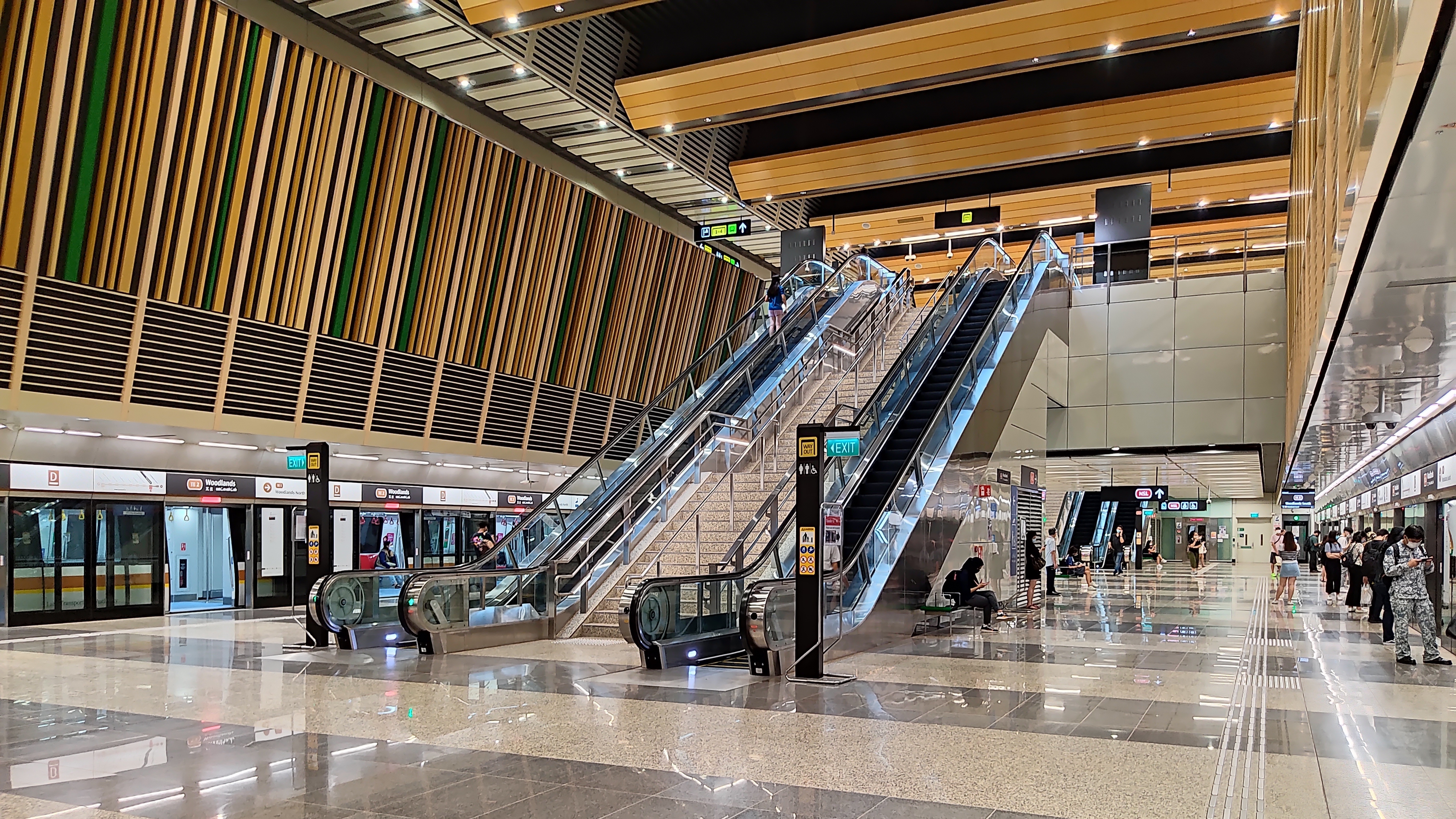
TEL platform

The two-level TEL station is designed by Arup and Aedas. At 330 metres (1,080 ft) long and 24 metres (79 ft) deep underground, the station is designed to be integrated with surrounding developments and other transportation modes. A reference to Woodlands' past as a rubber plantation, the station has a colour scheme of brown and grey with "streaks of green" shared by rubber trees. The station columns are designed to resemble tree-like branches.

The TEL platforms are accessible via many escalators and stairs, with a large visual opening. The linkway that connects the TEL platforms to the NSL platforms have gaps in the roof to allow sunlight into the station. Largely naturally ventilated, the station utilises minimal energy. The four entrances of the TEL station are also naturally ventilated, with transparent structures to allow sunlight into the entrances. They are intended to function as "lanterns" that will light up the urban landscape around the entrances at night. The station design won the LTEA 2022 under the Infrastructure and Development category.

Designated as a Civil Defence (CD) shelter, its large interior is designed to accommodate up to 9,000 people in emergencies. The walls, floor and roof slabs are strengthened with reinforced concrete, and the station has facilities for people to undergo decontamination. As a result of the CD guidelines, the station is more spacious that will allow it to support higher passenger capacity in the future.
