= MTV Europe Music Award for Best World Stage Performance =

Category of MTV Europe Music Awards

The following is a list of the MTV Europe Music Award winners and nominees for Best World Stage Performance.

== 2000s ==
Year	Winner	Nominees
2009	Linkin Park; WS Live in Los Angeles 2009	Coldplay - WS Live in Tokyo 2009; Kid Rock - WS Rock Am Ring 2009; Kings of Leon - WS Live in Dublin 2009; Lady Gaga - WS Live in Malta 2009

== 2010s ==
Year	Winner	Nominees
2010	Tokio Hotel; WS Live In Malaysia 2010	Thirty Seconds to Mars - WS Rock Am Ring 2010; Gorillaz - WS Live at the Roundhouse, London 2010; Green Day - WS Live in Munich 2009; Muse - WS Rock Am Ring 2010; Katy Perry - WS Live In Malaysia 2010
2011	Thirty Seconds to Mars; WS Live In Mexico City 2010	The Black Eyed Peas - WS Live in New York City 2011; Enrique Iglesias - WS Live in Batumi, Georgia 2011; Kings of Leon - WS Rock Am Ring 2011; Linkin Park - WS Live In Madrid, Spain 2010; Ozzy Osbourne - WS Live at Ozzfest, London 2010; Snoop Dogg - WS Live in London 2010; Diddy – Dirty Money - WS Live in Glasgow 2010; My Chemical Romance - WS in Valencia 2011; Arcade Fire - WS Live at Xacobeo Stadium 2010
2012	Justin Bieber; WS Live In Malaysia 2012	Arcade Fire - WS Live at Xacobeo Stadium 2010; Arctic Monkeys - WS Live in Valencia 2012; B.o.B - WS Gothenburg, Sweden 2012; Evanescence - WS Live In Arkansas 2012; Flo Rida - WS Live in Malta 2012; Jason Derulo - WS Live In Belfast 2011; Joe Jonas - WS Live in Mexico City 2011; Kasabian - WS Live In Belfast 2011; Kesha - WS Live In Mexico City 2011; LMFAO - WS Live In Malta 2012; Maroon 5 - WS Live In Las Vegas 2011; Nelly Furtado - Live In Malta 2012; Red Hot Chili Peppers - WS Live In Belfast 2011; Sean Paul - WS Live In Belfast 2011; Snoop Dogg - Live In Malta 2012; Snow Patrol - WS Live In Belfast 2011; Taylor Swift - WS Speak Now World Tour 2012
2013	Linkin Park; WS Monterrey, Mexico 2012	The Black Keys - WS NY Webster City Hall 2012; Fun - WS Rock Am Ring 2013; Garbage - WS Monterrey, Mexico 2012; Green Day - WS Rock Am Ring 2013; Jessie J - WS Malta 2013; Alicia Keys - WS Manchester 2012; Macklemore & Ryan Lewis - WS Wireless 2013; Jason Mraz - WS Live In Myanmar 2012; No Doubt - WS Frankfurt 2012; Rita Ora - WS Malta 2013; Paramore - WS Rock Am Ring 2013; Robin Thicke - WS Malaysia 2013; Snoop Lion - WS Durban 2013; The Killers - WS Big Day Out 2013
2014	Enrique Iglesias; WS Isle of MTV Malta	Afrojack – WS Live in Amsterdam 2013; B.o.B – WS Malaysia 2014; Ellie Goulding – WS Wireless London; Fall Out Boy – WS Monterrey; Flo Rida – WS Mexico; Hardwell – WS Isle of MTV Malta; Imagine Dragons – WS Live in Amsterdam; Kings of Leon – WS Rock am Ring Germany; Linkin Park – WS Rock am Ring Germany; Nicole Scherzinger – WS Isle of MTV Malta; Pharrell Williams – WS Wireless London; Simple Plan – WS Monterrey; The Killers – WS Live in Amsterdam 2013
2015	Ed Sheeran; WS Live V Festival 2014	Iggy Azalea - WS Wireless Festival; Jason Derulo - WS Live In Malaysia; Jessie Ware - WS Live at MTV Crashes Cork; Kaiser Chiefs - WS Live in Athens; Slash -WS Live in Glasgow 2014; Tomorrowland; YG - WS Live From Manila 2015; Afrojack; Alicia Keys; B.o.B.; Biffy Clyro; Charli XCX – WS Isle of MTV Malta; Dizzee Rascal – WS Isle of MTV Malta
2016	Martin Garrix; WS Isle of MTV Malta	Duran Duran - Piazza Del Duomo, 2015; Ellie Goulding - Piazza Del Duomo, 2015; Jess Glynne - WS Isle of MTV Malta; OneRepublic - MTV Evolution, Philippines, 2016; Tinie Tempah - MTV Crashes, Plymouth, 2015; Tomorrowland; Wiz Khalifa - WS Isle of MTV Malta
2017	The Chainsmokers - WS Isle of MTV Malta	DNCE - WS Isle of MTV Malta; Foo Fighters; Kings of Leon; Steve Aoki - WS Isle of MTV Malta; Tomorrowland
2018	Alessia Cara - MTV Spotlight @ Hyperplay, 2018	Clean Bandit - MTV Crashes Plymouth, 2017; Charli XCX - MTV Crashes Plymouth, 2017; David Guetta - Trafalgar Square, 2017; Jason Derulo - Isle of MTV Malta, 2018; Post Malone - Wireless Festival, 2018; Migos - Wireless Festival, 2018; J. Cole - Wireless Festival, 2018; Nick Jonas - MTV Spotlight @ Hyperplay, 2018
2019	Muse (band) - Bilbao, Spain 2018	Bebe Rexha - Isle of MTV Malta, 2019; Hailee Steinfeld - Isle of MTV Malta, 2018; Muse - Bilbao, Spain 2018; The 1975 - Lollapalooza Paris Festival 2019; twenty øne piløts - Lollapalooza Paris Festival 2019

== See also ==
- MTV Video Music Award for Best Stage Performance
