= Tail Spin (Dreamworld) =

Flat amusement ride

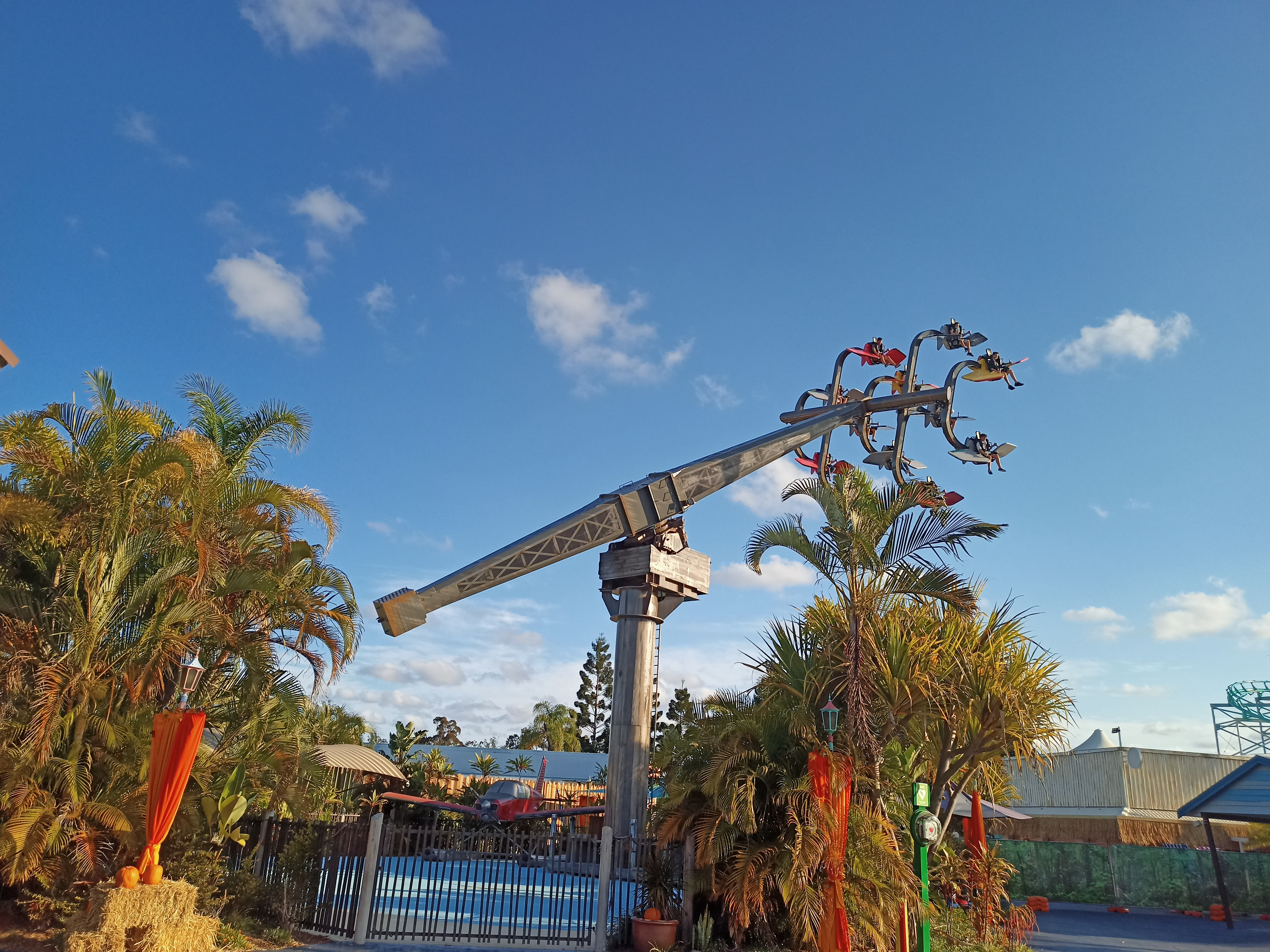
- The ride operating in October 2020.

Dreamworld
- Area: Ocean Parade
- Coordinates: 27°51′53.10″S 153°18′58.76″E
- Status: Operating
- Cost: A$2,500,000
- Opening date: 20 September 2014
- Replaced: Reef Diver

Ride statistics
- Attraction type: Sky Fly
- Manufacturer: Gerstlauer
- Theme: Seaplanes
- Height: 22 m (72 ft)
- Speed: 33 km/h (21 mph)
- Capacity: 240-360 riders per hour
- Vehicles: 12
- Riders per vehicle: 1
- Duration: 2:00
- Height restriction: 130 cm (4 ft 3 in)
- Website: Official website
- Ride Express available
- Single rider line available

Tail Spin is a Gerstlauer Sky Fly flat ride located within the Ocean Parade section of the Dreamworld amusement park on the Gold Coast, Australia. The ride began operation on 20 September 2014 as the replacement of Reef Diver.

Tail Spin is one of Dreamworld's seven thrill rides and has a height of 22 metres (72 ft). The ride has a duration of approximately 2 minutes and can carry up to 12 riders.

== History ==
On 28 April 2014, Dreamworld subsequently removed their Reef Diver attraction and announced that their “Big 8 Thrill Rides” are evolving into the “Big 9 Thrill Rides”, thus confirming that a new thrill ride was being built. Dreamworld also announced a new water slide for WhiteWater World, both attractions were expected to open in September.

Groundworks of the, then unnamed, Tail Spin began in June. It was later announced that Dreamworld would be getting a Gerstlauer Sky Fly named Tail Spin and it will open in September along with Triple Vortex. Soon in August, vertical construction of the ride began, with the ride's structure being constructed. Testing for the ride began around a week before the official opening. Tail Spin opened on 20 September 2014. The ride was a first of its kind in Australia, allowing guests to control their ride experience.

== Characteristics ==
Tail Spin is one of Dreamworld's seven thrill rides alongside The Claw, The Giant Drop, The Gold Coaster, Mick Doohan's Motocoaster, Pandamonium and Steel Taipan. The ride opened as the ninth addition to Dreamworld's former “Big 9 Thrill Rides” banner and is still currently one of the newest thrill rides opened by Dreamworld. The ride has a maximum speed of 33 kilometres per hour (21 mph) and goes up at a height of 22 metres (72 ft).

The ride consists of twelve small sea planes which can be controlled by the rider to either stay stationary or to spin.

== Ride Experience ==
=== Theming ===
Tail Spin is themed to seaplanes with its surrounding structures and buildings themed to a seaplane base. The ride's plant room being themed as a control centre. The ride's structure and surrounding buildings are painted to look slightly worn. A Piper PA-28 Cherokee was also purchased and repainted to suit the theme of the ride.

=== Entrance and queue ===
The entrance to Tail Spin is located opposite the ramp to the entrance of Shockwave and next to the Gamesite Arcade. The ride has three different queues. The three queues are: general admission, Ride Express and single riders. Tail Spin was the second ride, alongside Wipeout, at the park to have a single riders queue, the first being Mick Doohan's Motocoaster.

=== Ride ===
Guests will be loaded onto one of twelve small sea planes that are connected onto a large beam. Over the shoulder harnesses will be lowered automatically. The large beam then lifts riders up and then starts to rotate riders. Riders are able to control the planes by adjusting the positions of the wings using sticks that are connected on both wings. This allows riders to spin their plane up to 360 degrees if they wish. Riders will reach a maximum height of 22m and top speed of 33 km. The entire ride cycle will last for two minutes. Airplane noises are played throughout the ride.

== Reception ==
Reception of the Tail Spin has been mostly positive. Ben Roache from OurWorlds stated “from those who are young, or just young at heart to those who want to compete with their mates for most barrel rolls, Tailspin is incredibly pliable“. He also states “(Tail Spin) is an incredibly versatile thrill ride”. Dreamworld CEO, Craig Davidson, stated that “(the ride) has enormous potential because every time you go on it the ride can be different”. The Australian Leisure Management states that the “new Tail Spin ride had proved to be one of the success stories of the recent spring school holidays”.

== See also ==
- 2014 in amusement parks
