= Zombie Evilution =

Defunct attraction at Dreamworld

Dreamworld
- Area: Ocean Parade
- Coordinates: 27°51′54″S 153°19′0.43″E
- Status: Closed
- Soft opening date: September 2013
- Opening date: 13 September 2013
- Closing date: March 2018
- Replaced: AVPX

Ride statistics
- Attraction type: Walkthrough Scare Attraction
- Manufacturer: Sudden Impact Entertainment
- Designer: Lynton V. Harris
- Site area: 650 m^{2} (7,000 sq ft)
- Capacity: 160 riders per hour
- Participants per group: 8 every 3 minutes
- Duration: 10 minutes

Zombie Evilution was a seasonal multi-use attraction at Dreamworld theme park on the Gold Coast, Queensland, Australia. The attraction was originally introduced as a scare maze before being converted to a laser skirmish attraction. It opened on Friday the 13th of September 2013, replacing AVPX. From 2016, the attraction was used as a scare maze for Park After Dark events. The attraction closed in March 2018.

== History ==
In 2009, Dreamworld launched AVPX, a laser skirmish attraction by Sudden Impact! Entertainment Company. The attraction was originally licensed for a two-year contract, which was later extended for a further two years. In late 2012, Dreamworld contracted Lynton V. Harris of Sudden Impact to work on creating a replacement. Using the town name of "Kevil Hill", originally developed for an attraction at Taman Safari in Indonesia, Harris developed the Zombie Evilution attraction concept.

On 6 March 2013, Dreamworld officially announced that AVPX would be closing at the end of the month, stating "a new enemy will arise in 2013". On 31 March 2013, AVPX operated for the final time with Dreamworld stating it would be replaced by a new attraction which is "to die for". The new attraction was later announced to be named Zombie Evilution.

Zombie Evilution officially opened to the public on Friday the 13th of September 2013 as a scare maze. The maze featured live actors, with guests being admitted in small groups. On 14 October 2013, the scare maze was closed, pending conversion into a laser skirmish attraction. On 18 October 2013, the attraction reopened to the public.

In 2015, the attraction was relegated to a Seasonal position, it no longer operated during the School periods (including weekends), only on School Holiday Periods and during the night-time Screamworld events (As a scare-maze).

On 27 January 2016, the attraction closed for the off-peak season, it was later revealed that the attraction will no longer operate as laser tag, however, the park claimed that the attraction would still be in use as a scare-maze for their night-time, and other special, events. The exit room were later used as a merchandise store for the Tiger Cub Kindy area, which occupied the area in front of the attraction in February 2016. The attraction reopened late 2016 as a walk through scare attraction and currently operates weekends from 10:30am to 5pm

The area is set to be used for Count Kenny's Mystery Mansion, a family friendly walk-through attraction, for the 2021 Happy Halloween event.

== Laser Skirmish ==
Guests admitted in groups of 30 into one of three briefing rooms. The guests were asked to stand by a weapon which determines their teams. Half of the group were infected humans, with the other half being normal, uninfected humans. A short preshow details the backstory for the attraction. The attraction was set in a small town named Kevil Hill (a play on the evil & live palindrome), a zombie utopia created by billionaire James Buchanan (J.B.) Kevil (portrayed by Tony Bonner). Professor Jacques Madigan manages the town's cryonics chamber, where the dead are preserved for a future re-awakening.

Guests were told the rules and how to use their weapons, before being moved from the briefing room, down a tunnel to a final room before the main arena. The main arena is 650 square metres (7,000 sq ft) and featured multiple buildings. To earn points players shoot those from the opposite team.

== See also ==
- 2013 in amusement parks
- 2016 in amusement parks
- 2018 in amusement parks
- Terminator X: A Laser Battle for Salvation, another Sudden Impact Entertainment laser skirmish attraction
