= Burnout (ride) =

Amusement ride at Funfields

Funfields
- Status: Closed
- Opening date: 23 November 2012
- Closing date: September 2019

Dreamworld
- Name: Roulette (1983-1993), Stingray (1993-2012)
- Area: Ocean Parade
- Status: Relocated
- Opening date: 1983
- Closing date: May 2012

Ride statistics
- Attraction type: Trabant
- Manufacturer: Chance Rides
- Theme: Motorsports
- Rows: 18
- Riders per row: 2
- Height restriction: 110 cm (3 ft 7 in)

Burnout is a Chance Rides Trabant amusement ride at Funfields. It was originally located at Dreamworld on the Gold Coast from 1983 until 2012 where it was known as the Roulette and Stingray. The ride was rethemed and relocated to Funfields in time for an opening on 23 November 2012.

== History ==
Burnout opened in 1983 as the Roulette at Dreamworld. It was added alongside the Reef Diver (then known as the Enterprise) to expand Dreamworld's Country Fair themed area which opened in the previous year. Its original theme and colour scheme matched that of a Roulette wheel. When operating as the Roulette, the ride was located between where The Claw and Wipeout stand today. In 1993, the northern portion of Country Fair was rethemed to become Ocean Parade. The Vekoma Wakiki Wave Super Flip named Wipeout was added and the Roulette was rethemed to the Stingray and relocated to a portion on land on the southern side of the Wipeout. In 2001, the ride was removed to construct an entrance for the Cyclone which opened in December of that year. In 2002, the ride returned in a new location which was formerly the site of the Swinger Zinger (then known as Zumer) which had just been relocated to Nickelodeon Central. It remained in operation at that location until May 2012, when the ride was removed. Stingray was sold Funfields in Melbourne. The ride was rethemed to a motoring theme and reopened as Burnout on 23 November 2012.

== Ride ==
Burnout consists of up to 36 riders seated in pairs around a circular disc. Each pair of riders are restrained with a single lap bar. The ride cycle begins with the Burnout from two axes at a slow speed on the flat. The carriage is then titled which results in a fluctuating movement in a wavelike manner. When the ride is fluctuating in its wavelike manner, riders will feel like the ride isn't going that fast. However, when the ride is almost over, the person will feel forces on their body, and get pushed toward the outside of the cars. This happens when the ride starts lowering to the ground in a non-wavelike manner. When the ride moves in this way, it acts like a Music Express-type ride.
