= Sudden Impact! Entertainment Company =

American theatrical attraction manufacturer

The Sudden Impact! Entertainment Company
- Industry: Theatrical attractions and shows
- Founded: 1991
- Founder: Lynton V. Harris
- Headquarters: New York City, United States
- Key people: Lynton V. Harris (Chairman & CEO); Dominic McChesney (Assistant Director)
- Website: Official website

The Sudden Impact! Entertainment Company is an entertainment company based in New York City, United States. The company has created temporary and permanent scare attractions for amusement parks and traveling carnivals across the globe.

== History ==
The Sudden Impact! Entertainment Company was founded in 1991 by Lynton V. Harris. Harris was born in Australia and began his career as a DJ at age 15. From there he worked up the ranks to be marketing director for 10 Australian radio stations. In 1991, he travelled to the United States and discovered the money that could be made in entertainment attractions. Harris started the Sudden Impact! Entertainment Company with an aim of operating attractions at Madison Square Gardens in New York City. In 1996, the company began a four-year season of Madison SCARE Gardens selling approximately 250,000 tickets.

In the early 2000s, the company was ready to open their attractions in Washington, however, due to the September 11 attacks and the Beltway sniper attacks (in 2001 and 2002 respectively), these plans were shelved costing the company and Harris millions. Sudden Impact began to focus on attractions in Australia with the opening of several temporary attractions at amusement parks and traveling carnivals. In 2009, the company began to deviate from the standard scare attractions with the opening of themed indoor laser skirmish games such as AVPX at Dreamworld.

== Attractions ==
Name	Location		Opened	Closed	Notes
Angoscia	Dreamworld	Gold Coast, Queensland, Australia	December 26, 2006	July 7, 2007	
AVPX	Dreamworld	Gold Coast, Queensland, Australia	April 10, 2009	March 31, 2013	
Chamber Live: Serial Killers	Madame Tussauds London	Central London, England	Unknown	Unknown	
Chamber of Horrors Live	Madame Tussauds London	Central London, England	Early 2003	Unknown	
Freakshow 3D	Thorpe Park	Surrey, England	October 2002	August 2005	
Freddy's Nightmare maze	Warner Bros. Movie World	Gold Coast, Queensland, Australia	October 8, 2010	October 31, 2010	
The Freezer	Dreamworld	Gold Coast, Queensland, Australia	December 26, 2006	July 7, 2007	
The Freezer	Thorpe Park	Surrey, England	October 2002	October 2004	
The Freezer	Madison Square Garden	New York City, United States	Unknown	Unknown	
The Fright House	Unknown	United States	Unknown	Unknown	
Gotham Underground	Madison Square Garden	New York City, United States	1997	1997	
Lara Croft Tomb Raider: Enter the Tomb	Dreamworld	Gold Coast, Queensland, Australia	December 26, 2003	April 18, 2004	
Lara Croft Tomb Raider: Enter the Tomb	Luna Park Melbourne	St. Kilda, Melbourne, Victoria	2007	Unknown	
Lara Croft Tomb Raider: Enter the Tomb	Royal Adelaide Show	Adelaide, South Australia, Australia	September 3, 2010	September 11, 2009	
The Mummy Live	Madison Square Garden	New York City, United States	Unknown	Unknown	
The Mummy Returns	Dreamworld	Gold Coast, Queensland, Australia	June 23, 2001	July 8, 2001	
The Mummy Returns	Universal Studios Hollywood	Los Angeles County, California, United States	2002	2004	
The Mummy: Tomb of the Dragon Emperor Live	Dreamworld	Gold Coast, Queensland, Australia	September 8, 2008	January 2009	
The Mummy: Tomb of the Dragon Emperor Live	La Ronde	Montreal, Quebec, Canada	June 19, 2009	September 7, 2009	
Night at the Museum Live	Sunway Lagoon	Petaling Jaya, Malaysia	Unknown	Still open	
Pirate Jack's Halloween Adventure	Chessington World of Adventures	London, England	October 2002	Unknown	
Prison Break Live	Luna Park Melbourne	St. Kilda, Melbourne, Victoria	2006	Unknown	
Prison Break Live	Luna Park Sydney	Sydney, New South Wales, Australia	2008	Unknown	
Prison Break Live	Royal Adelaide Show	Adelaide, South Australia, Australia	September 5, 2009	September 13, 2009	
Prison Break Live	Sunway Lagoon	Petaling Jaya, Malaysia	Unknown	Unknown	
Psycho 3D maze	Warner Bros. Movie World	Gold Coast, Queensland, Australia	October 8, 2010	2010 (seasonal)	
Rumah Hantu 3D	Sunway Lagoon	Petaling Jaya, Malaysia	Unknown	Unknown	
SAW maze	Warner Bros. Movie World	Gold Coast, Queensland, Australia	October 8, 2010	October 2011	
SAW maze	Six Flags Great America	Gurnee, Illinois, United States	Unknown	Unknown	
SAW maze	The Scorpion King Live	Unknown	Unknown	Unknown	Unknown
Scream	Madame Tussauds Shanghai	Unknown	Unknown	Unknown	
Scream	Amsterdam	Unknown	Unknown	Unknown	
Terminator Alive	Sunway Lagoon	Petaling Jaya, Malaysia	May 2010	Still open	
Terminator X: A Laser Battle for Salvation	Adventure World	Perth, Western Australia, Australia	December 26, 2009	January 31, 2010	
Terminator X: A Laser Battle for Salvation	La Ronde	Montreal, Quebec, Canada	2010	Still open	
Terminator X: A Laser Battle for Salvation	Royal Adelaide Show	Adelaide, South Australia, Australia	September 4, 2009	September 12, 2009	
Terminator X: A Laser Battle for Salvation	Six Flags Mexico	Mexico City, Mexico	2011	Still open	
Terminator X: A Laser Battle for Salvation	Sunway Lagoon	Petaling Jaya, Malaysia	May 2010	2012	
Terror in the Towers	Alton Towers	Staffordshire, England	October 2002	Unknown	
Terror Tunnel	Sunway Lagoon	Petaling Jaya, Malaysia	Unknown	Unknown	
Tomb Raider Legend Live	Adventure World	Perth, Western Australia, Australia	December 26, 2006	January 29, 2007	
Trolls Village	Dreamworld	Gold Coast, Queensland, Australia	2018	2019	
Universal Studios Monsters Alive	Unknown	Las Vegas, United States	Unknown	Unknown	
Van Helsing	Universal Studios Hollywood	Los Angeles County, California, United States	2004	2007	
Warwick Ghosts Alive	Warwick Castle	Warwickshire, England	2002	2008	
Zombie Apocalypse maze	Warner Bros. Movie World	Gold Coast, Queensland, Australia	October 1, 2011	October 2011	
Zombie Apocalypse maze	Wet'n'Wild Hawaii	Kapolei, Hawaii, United States	2010	2010	
Zombie Evilution	Dreamworld	Gold Coast, Queensland, Australia	September 13, 2013	March 2018	

== Shows ==
- Ice Age on Ice

== Scare School ==
External videos
- "Inside the dark mind of scaremaster Lynton Harris", ABC Lateline (March 2015)

Almost all of Sudden Impact! Entertainment Company's attractions feature live trained actors, commonly known as "scare actors". To be hired in this position, scare actors must complete the Scare School program. The Scare School is a 40-hour program where actors are trained to become the best "scarers" they can be. The Scare School has travelled the globe and has been featured in its own television series. The majority of the training is done in broad daylight with very little done indoors or at night-time.
