= AVPX =

Former attraction at Dreamworld

Dreamworld
- Area: Ocean Parade
- Coordinates: 27°51′54″S 153°19′0.43″E
- Status: Removed
- Cost: A$2.5 million
- Opening date: 10 April 2009
- Closing date: 31 March 2013
- Replaced by: Zombie Evilution

Ride statistics
- Attraction type: Indoor Laser Skirmish
- Manufacturer: Sudden Impact Entertainment
- Theme: Alien vs. Predator
- Capacity: 300 riders per hour
- Participants per group: 30
- Duration: 5 minutes of combat plus a preshow
- Q4U available

AVPX (short for Alien vs. Predator vs. You) was a themed indoor laser skirmish attraction at Dreamworld on the Gold Coast, Queensland, Australia. The attraction was based on the Alien vs. Predator films (mainly the first film). It was the biggest indoor laser skirmish attraction in Australia and was included in Dreamworld's admission price.

== History ==
On 2 February 2009, the Vortex closed and was removed from the park. The ride building remained standing and was remodelled for use in Dreamworld's new attraction. On 10 April 2009, AVPX officially opened to the public. This attraction was built by Sudden Impact Entertainment - the same company that built various other walk-through attractions for Dreamworld in the past.

On 6 March 2013, Dreamworld announced that AVPX would be closing at the end of the month, stating "a new enemy will arise in 2013". On 31 March 2013, AVPX operated for the final time with Dreamworld stating it would be replaced by a new attraction which is "to die for". Sudden Impact Entertainment was again employed to develop the new attraction which was later announced to be named Zombie Evilution.

== Attraction ==
Guests were admitted in groups of 30 into one of three Weyland Industries Briefing Rooms. The guests were asked to stand by a weapon which determined their teams. Half of the group would be infected humans, with the other half being normal, uninfected humans. After watching a small preshow, guests were told the rules and how to use their weapons. The group would then be moved from the Briefing Room, down the Ice Tunnel to Antarctica where the Aliens and Predators would await. This was the final room before the main arena. Within this room guests were told that the situation past this point was volatile.

The main arena was 650 square metres (7,000 sq ft) and could be divided into three sections:

- A two-story Temple
- A Queen Alien Labyrinth
- An enclosed Sacrificial Chamber

To earn points players would shoot those from the opposite team. In addition there were objects, such as Aliens, Predators and eggs. Guests would also be required to watch out for return fire from various places around the arena. The arena featured doorways which led to the Temple and Sacrificial Chamber. Red lights illuminated these doors and removed points from those who crossed, while green lights signified that the doorway was harmless and could be entered.

== See also ==
- Terminator X: A Laser Battle for Salvation – Sudden Impact Entertainment's second laser skirmish attraction
