= Terminator X: A Laser Battle for Salvation =

Themed indoor laser skirmish attraction

Royal Adelaide Show
- Status: Closed
- Opening date: 4 September 2009
- Closing date: 12 September 2009
- Replaced: Prison Break Live

Adventure World
- Status: Closed
- Opening date: 26 December 2009
- Closing date: 31 January 2010

La Ronde
- Status: Closed
- Opening date: 1 May 2010
- Closing date: 2010

Sunway Lagoon
- Status: Closed
- Soft opening date: May 2010

Six Flags México
- Status: Closed
- Opening date: 3 February 2011

Ride statistics
- Attraction type: Indoor Laser Skirmish
- Manufacturer: Sudden Impact Entertainment
- Designer: Lynton V. Harris
- Theme: Terminator
- Participants per group: 30
- Duration: 5 minutes of combat plus a preshow

Terminator X: A Laser Battle for Salvation (often shortened to just Terminator X) is a themed indoor laser skirmish attraction created by Lynton V. Harris of Sudden Impact Entertainment. The attraction is currently located at Sunway Lagoon in Petaling Jaya, Malaysia and at Six Flags México on February 3, 2011.

== History ==
The first Terminator X attraction debuted at the Royal Adelaide Show in Australia in 2009. It was then moved to Adventure World in Perth, Western Australia later that year for the summer season. In early 2010, that particular installation was shipped to the United States. By May 2010, the attraction had opened at both La Ronde in Montreal, Canada, and at Sunway Lagoon in Petaling Jaya, Malaysia. In November 2010, Six Flags announced that they would open the attraction at Six Flags México in 2011.

== Attraction ==
Groups of 30 guests enter a briefing room. Each player is given instructions and battle gear in this room. They are then ushered into the themed arena where the combat takes place. For approximately five minutes two teams of 15 not only battle against each other but also against the intelligent arena and against 12 characters from the Terminator franchise.

== See also ==
- AVPX – Sudden Impact Entertainment's first laser skirmish attraction
- 2011 in amusement parks
