= Wipeout (ride) =

Newer form of the Trabant

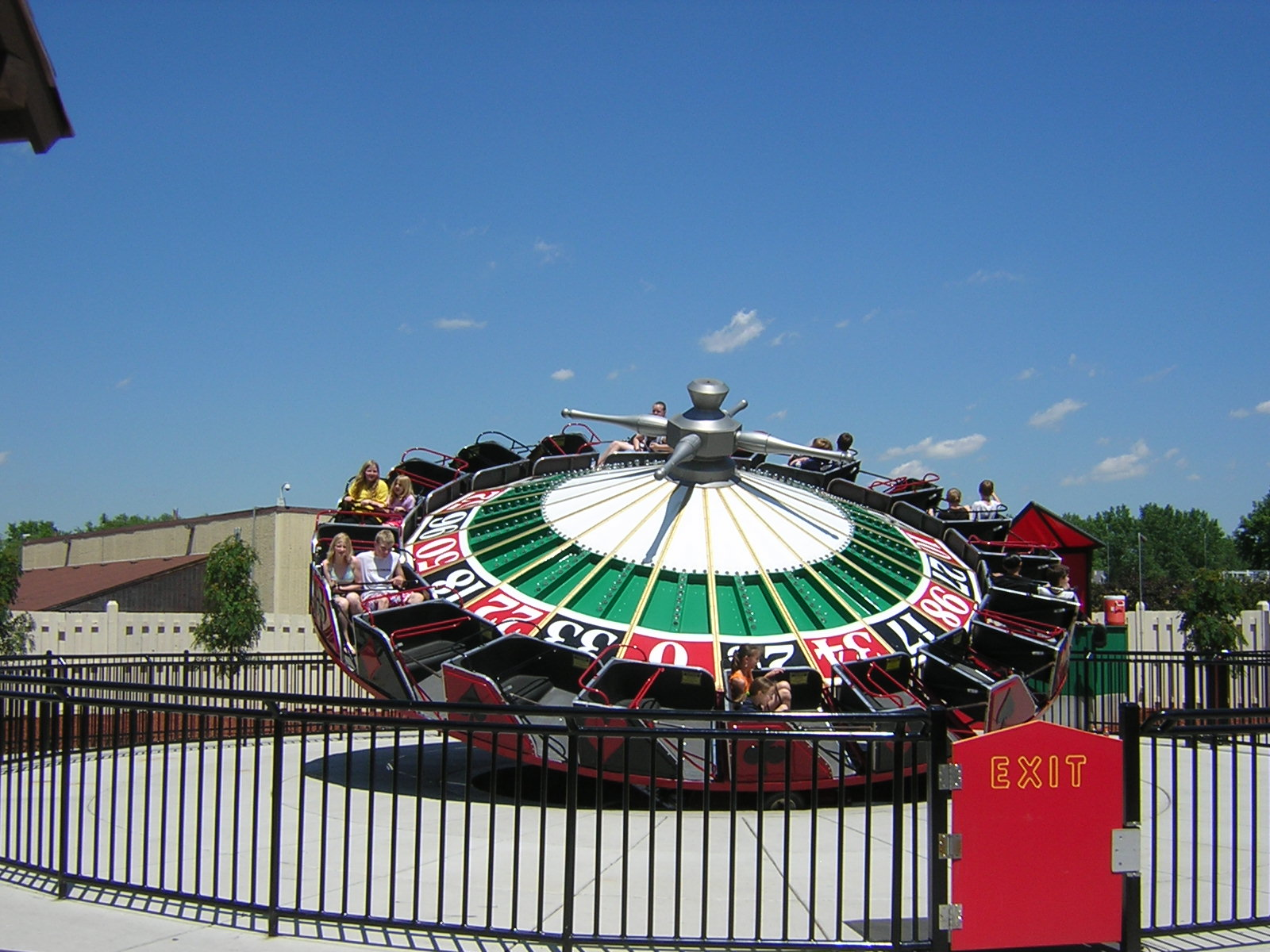
"Wheel of Fortune" Trabant at Valleyfair

The Wipeout and Trabant are models of amusement rides manufactured by Chance Rides. Often seen at fairs and traveling carnivals, their design consists of a giant wheel which tilts at a steep angle, fluctuates in a wavelike manner, and spins at various speeds. There is a motor underneath the ride that makes both of these rides raise up and down.

== History ==
Carl Sedlmayr of Royal American Shows discovered the Trabant (German for satellite) in Germany. He purchased the manufacturing rights from the young German man who invented it, and approached Harold Chance of Chance Industries to build the ride. Chance saw the potential in the ride, made it flashier by adding lights and colorful panels, and mounted it on a trailer so it would be portable.

The first ride was sold in 1963 and it became very popular with traveling shows. Chance eventually started producing a permanent model that was not mounted to a trailer. The ride was also available in a number of different themes such as Mexican Sombrero, Wagon Wheel, and Roulette Wheel. Chance sold 254 Trabant rides between 1963 and 1990. In 1991, Chance introduced the Wipeout, an updated version of the Trabant that has seating that faces in both directions and is capable of spinning faster than a Trabant.

== Ride cycle ==
During the duration of the ride, the ride changes speeds. When the ride is fluctuating in its wavelike manner, the person will feel like the ride is not going that fast. However, when the ride is almost over, the person will feel forces on their body, and get pushed toward the outside of the cars. This happens when the ride starts lowering to the ground in a non-wavelike manner.

Both the Trabant and Wipeout move forward and backward. Because the forces experienced on the ride can cause a rider to move sideways and potentially slip under the lap bar if riding alone, riders must be seated in pairs (sharing a lap bar). Most parks and carnivals require that riders be a minimum of 42 inches [107 cm] tall with an adult, and 48 inches [123 cm] tall without an adult.

The Wipeout can accommodate up to 40 people. Seating consists of 10 groups of four seats each. Each group seats a pair of riders on the left and another pair on the right.

== Appearances ==
There are only 2 traveling Trabants in the UK, The oldest one known as Craig Murray's Super Satellite available for hire only from Bounce Time. Originally built in America in 1961 by Chance Rides and now fully restored and in excellent working condition.

The original one sent to Australia (built by Bennett) is still traveling and still provides significant competition for some of the newest rides.

Inners Shows out of Franklinton, NC, have and operate a traveling Trabant named the Drive-In at fairs and festivals up and down the East Coast.

James Gang Amusements out of Andalusia, Alabama have and operate a Trabant under its original name. Their route includes Alabama, Georgia, Mississippi, Tennessee and Indiana.

El Sombrero at Six Flags Over Texas is a portable Trabant that was installed in 1965. In 2006, the ride was moved from its previous location, removed from the trailer, and given a complete overhaul. It is one of the oldest operating Trabant rides at a permanent amusement park.

Other appearances include:

- Gambler [Wild Waves Theme & Waterpark Federal Way WA ]
- Kryptonite Kollider – Six Flags New England (Wipeout)
- Casino – DelGrosso's Amusement Park, previously located at Kings Island as Wheel of Fortune.
- Mad Rex – Six Flags New Orleans, currently closed.
- Burnout – Funfields (Trabant), previously known as "Stingray" and located at Dreamworld.
- Wipeout – Knott's Berry Farm (Wipeout) (Closed 2016, reopened 2018).
- Wipeout – Knoebels Amusement Resort (Closed)
- Wipeout – Lake Compounce, removed after 2020 season
- Cyclone Sam's – Worlds of Fun
- Wipeout – Canobie Lake Park (Salem, NH)
- Razzle Dazzle – Pleasure Island Family Theme Park
- Wipeout – Waldameer & Water World (Erie, PA)
- Trabant – Conneaut Lake Park (Conneaut Lake, PA)
- Wheel of Fortune – Kings Island (Mason, OH)
- Casino – Funtown Splashtown USA (Saco, ME)
- Twister – Dutch Wonderland (Lancaster, PA), previously known as "Rodeo" and located at Hersheypark.
- Wipeout – Playland (New York) (Rye, NY)
- Wipeout – Fall Festival (LeRoy, IL)
- Wipeout – Swyear Amusements (Athens, IL)
- Ballerina – Luna Park, Tel Aviv (Tel Aviv, Israel)
- Ruleta – Six Flags México (Mexico City, MX)
- Sidewinder – Wild Adventures (Clyattville, GA)
- Casino – Frontier City (Oklahoma City, OK)
- Casino - Chicketti Family Amusements (Enon, OH)
- Wipeout - McGinnis Amusements (Strongsville, OH)
- Wipeout - Poor Jack Amusements (Milton, IN)
- Gyro Force - Carowinds (Charlotte, NC), previously known as "Lady Luck" and located at Adventureland (Altoona, IA)
- Yacuma - Swampy Jack's Wongo Adventure (Panama City Beach, FL)
