= Ocean Parade (Dreamworld) =

Themed land at Dreamworld amusement park

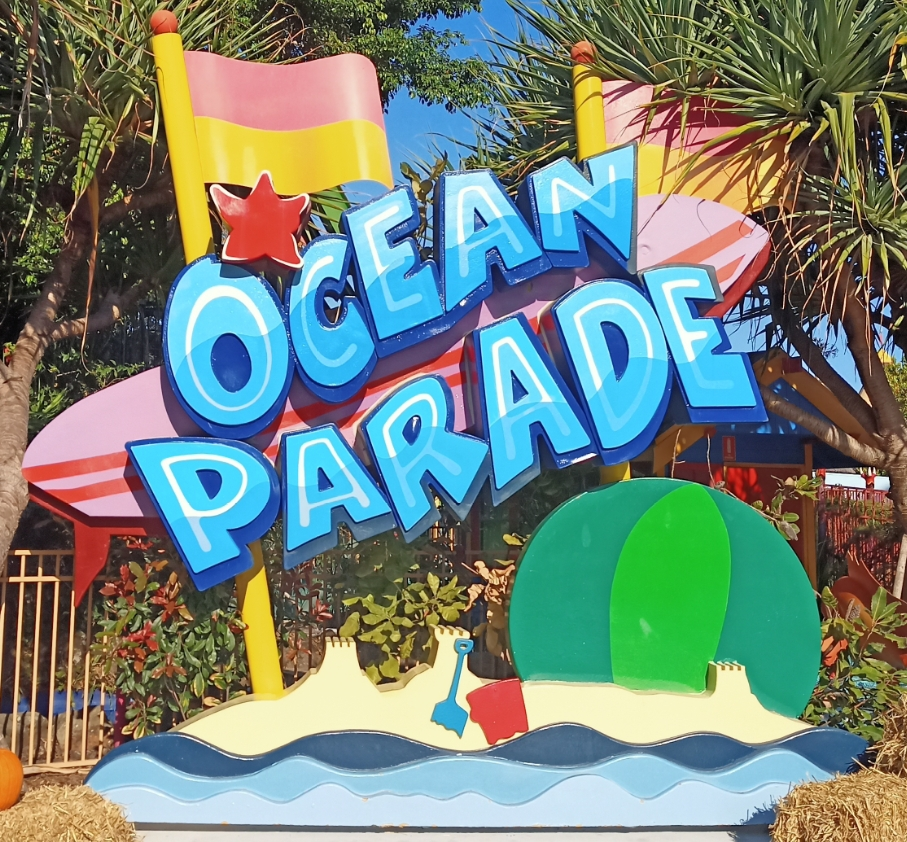
- Interactive map of Ocean Parade
- Status: Operating
- Theme: Beach

Attractions
- Total: 10
- Roller coasters: 1
- Other rides: 8
- Shows: 1

Dreamworld
- Coordinates: 27.864475°S 153.316140°E
- Opened: 1993
- Replaced: County Fair

Ocean Parade is a themed land at the Dreamworld amusement park on the Gold Coast, Queensland, Australia. It features 3 of the Big 7 Thrill Rides at Dreamworld, The Claw, The Gold Coaster and Tail Spin, which are within close proximity of each other. Ocean Parade has an Australian beach culture theme, and has beach-themed rides scattered around the area. It currently provides a link between Main Street, Kenny and Belinda's Dreamland, and the adjacent water park WhiteWater World.

== History ==
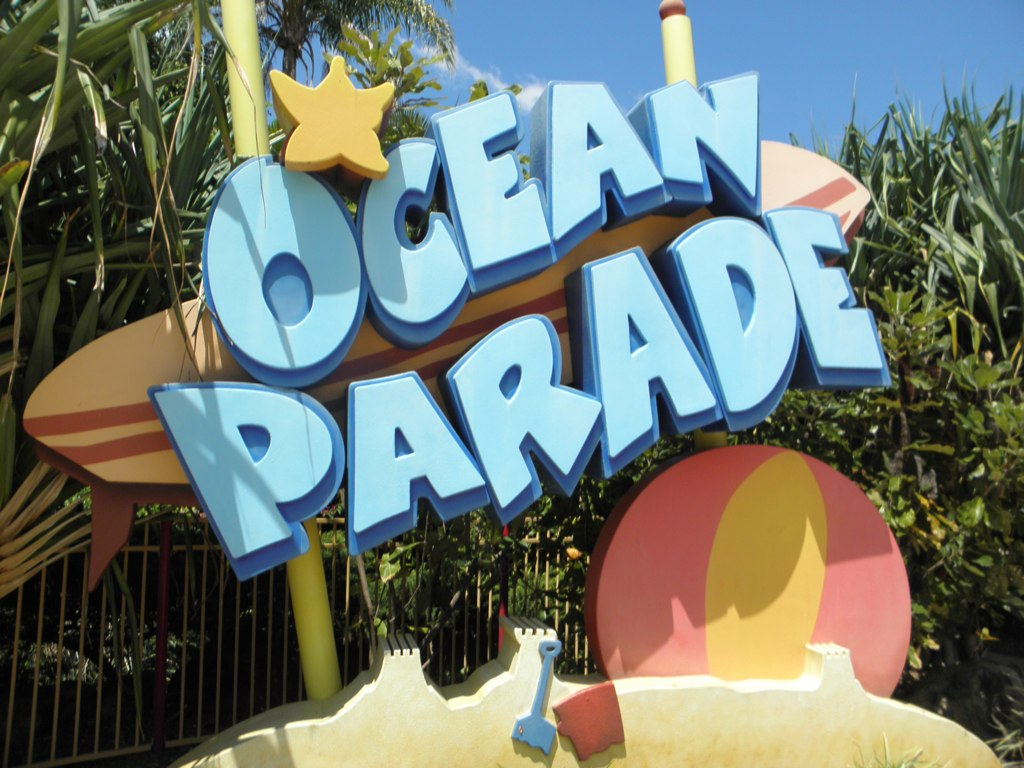
Ocean Parade sign in 2010

Ocean Parade opened in 1993, replacing the Northern end of Country Fair. The area has since been extended to cover all of the area once occupied by Country Fair. Since its opening, the most major change to the land was when The Claw was added in September 2004. This installation required the redesign of the pathway, dining and merchandise shops. In 2006, Ocean Parade opened a "park-hop" entrance to WhiteWater World, which is also owned by Ardent Leisure (the owners of Dreamworld). On 25 June 2011, Dreamworld opened a Zamperla Disk'O called Shockwave. In 2014, Dreamworld renovated Ocean Parade with the rebuild of Wipeout, closure of Reef Diver and the opening of Tail Spin. In 2015, a new themed area, Motorsport Experience, took over a part of Ocean Parade which included two refurbished attractions and a new exhibit. In March 2019, The Wipeout was closed permanently.

In November 2022, Dreamworld announced a $50m investment which included an expansion of Ocean Parade, taking over the former "Kung Fu Panda: Land of Awesomeness" sub-area of the former DreamWorks Experience precinct. The expansion includes rethemed attractions and a new splash pad.

The area was previously home to AVPX, Reef Diver, Stingray, Wipeout and Thunderbolt.

== Attractions ==
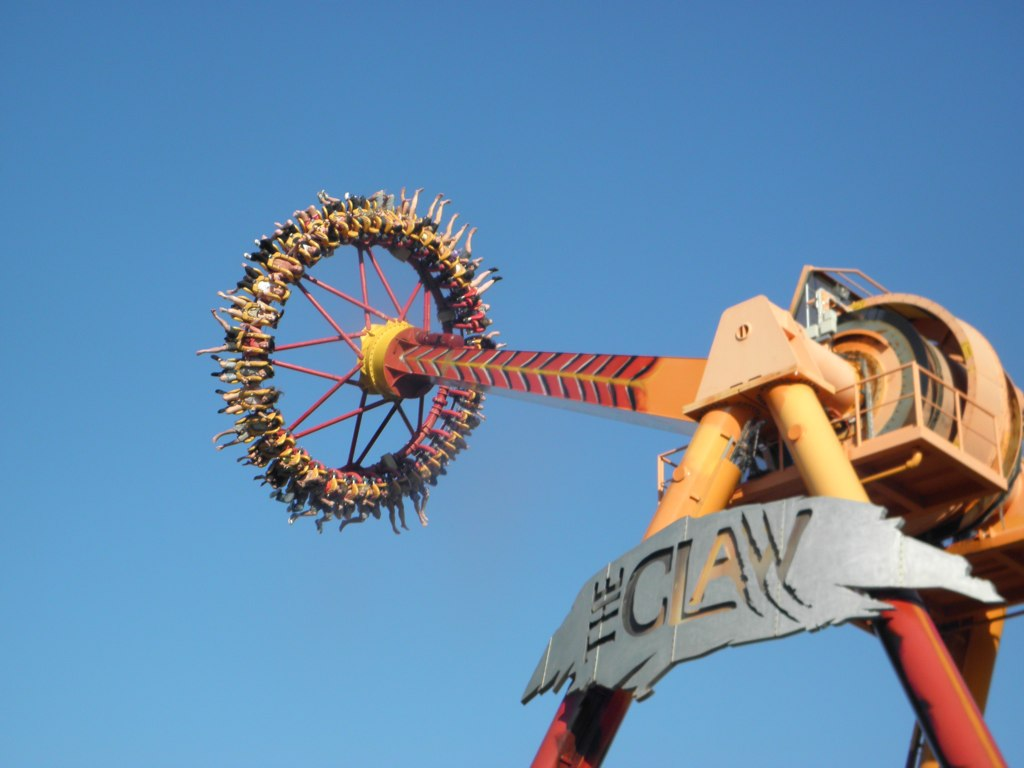
The Claw

=== Current attractions ===
- The Claw is an Intamin Gyro Swing which opened in September 2004. It is a one and a half-minute ride in which riders are swung from side to side on an axis in a similar fashion to that of a pirate ship ride. However, the seating arrangement on The Claw is in a circular formation. Part of the Big 7 marketing campaign.
- Deep Sea Dodgems is a set of bumper cars. The ride opened in 1983 with the adjacent Game Site arcade, and has had numerous rethemes throughout its lifetime including most recently as Skadoosh. The attraction had the temporary name of Dreamworld Dodgems, as part of the Ocean Parade expansion, until it closed for remodeling on 17 July 2023. It reopened on 1 September as Deep Sea Dodgems, refurbished with some props from the Henry the Octopus part of the Big Red Car Ride.
- Dreamworld Exhibition Centre is a large pillarless room that hosts several of temporary shows and attractions. It replaced Brock's Garage in 2018.
- Game Site is a large indoor arcade with various attractions including bowling, video games and arcade machines. The Game Site originally was home to a set of remote controlled trucks which have since been moved to Nickelodeon Central, these trucks were since removed during the transition from Nickelodeon Central to the DreamWorks Experience.

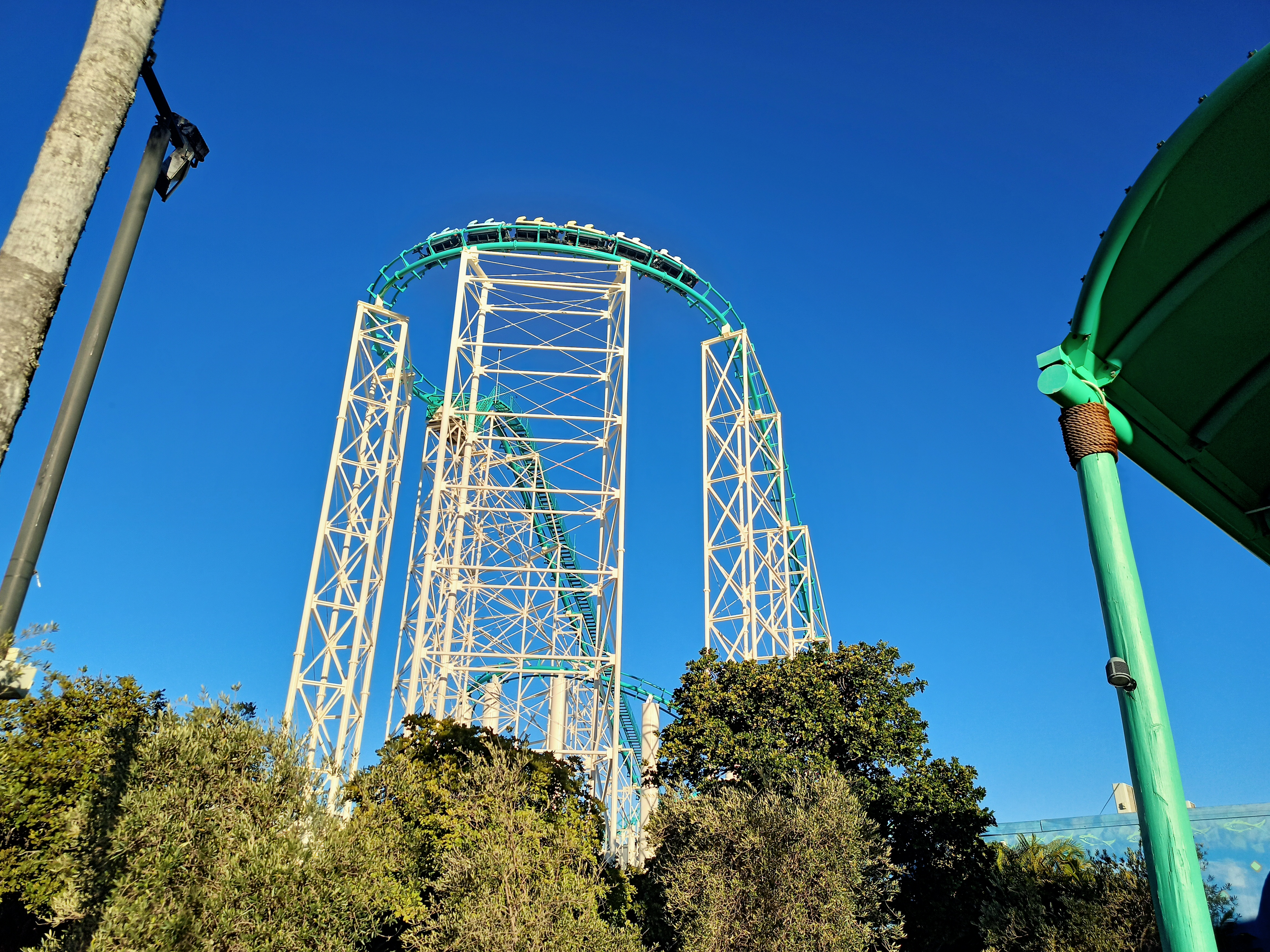
The Gold Coaster

- The Gold Coaster is one of the tallest high-speed gravity steel roller coasters in the Southern Hemisphere. When it opened in 2001, it was the tallest. Part of the Big 7 marketing campaign. The ride underwent a refurbishment in October–December 2015, and became Hot Wheels Hot SideWinder as part of the Motorsport Experience, which opened 26 December. In February 2020, Dreamworld announced that the ride would get a new look and theme. Soon after, repainting on the ride commenced with a new colour scheme to the tracks and trains. The ride reopened on 20 December 2020 as The Gold Coaster with a circa 1970s Gold Coast theme.

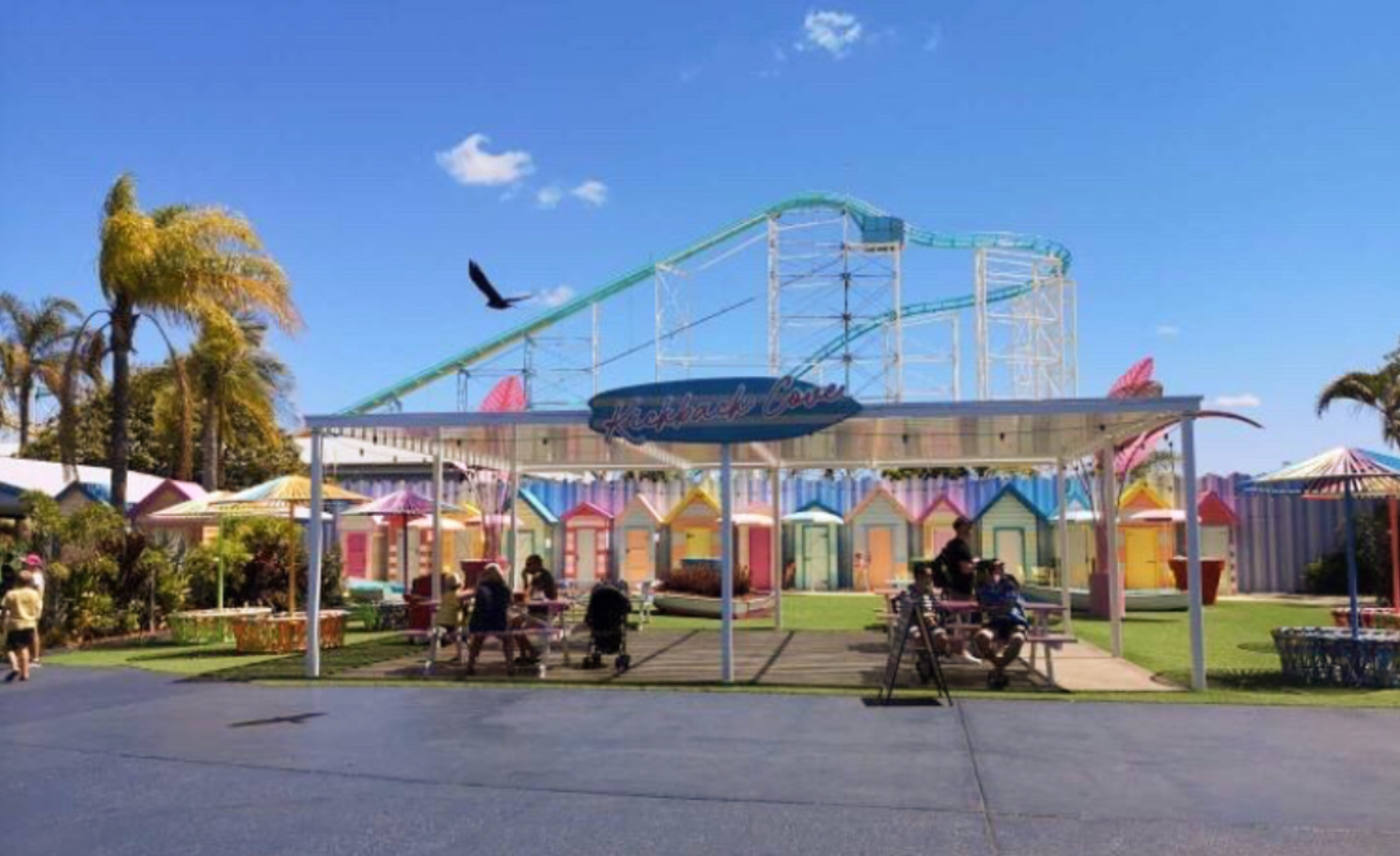
Kickback Cove

- Kickback Cove is a chill out area which opened in November 2019 which replaced the Wipeout. The area consists of several of picnic tables, umbrellas, deck chairs and photo opportunities. The under covered queue and some theming from the former Wipeout were reused and refurbished for the area. Dreamworld describes the attraction as "Dreamworlds most Instagrammable spot for a break".
- Seabed Splash is an interactive splash pad that opened in 2023 as part of the Ocean Parade expansion.
- Serpent Slayer is a Zamperla Air Race which opened in 2012 as part of the DreamWorks Experience precinct, as Pandamonuim. In 2023, Pandamonium was rebranded as Serpent Slayer as part of the Ocean Parade expansion.
- Shockwave is a Zamperla Disk'O. Construction began in April 2011 in a location between Ocean Parade and Nickelodeon Central for the family thrill ride announced just days prior. On 18 May 2011, Dreamworld officially announced that the ride would be called Shockwave.
- Tail Spin is a Gerstlauer Sky Fly which opened in September 2014. The ride was the ninth thrill ride to be added to the park. Guests sit in a small aeroplane that they can swing. With enough swinging they can spin around and around in circles. The ride replaced Reef Diver. Tail Spin is the first of its kind in Australia.

=== Former attractions ===
- AVPX is a themed indoor laser skirmish attraction based on the Alien vs. Predator films. It is the biggest indoor laser skirmish attraction in Australia and is included in Dreamworld's admission price. It opened April 2009.
- Brock's Garage was a car museum with a collection of Peter Brock's race cars. The exhibit opened in November 2015 as part of the new Motorsports Experience precinct. The exhibit closed in 2018 and was replaced with a convention centre.

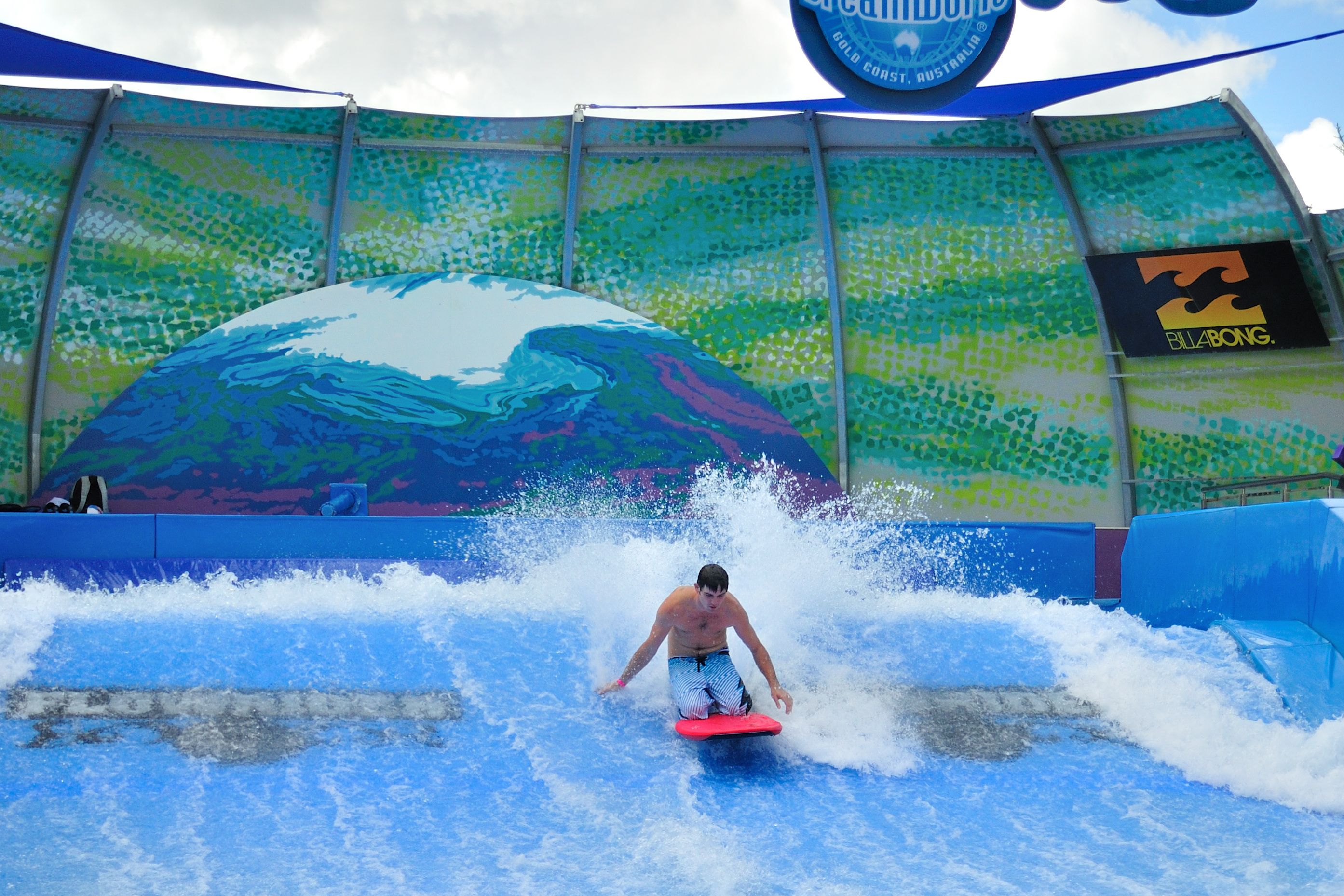
FlowRider

- FlowRider was born from the roots of surfing, skateboarding, snowboarding and bodyboarding. It was set on an artificial wave created on a flexible, trampoline-like base. This was Australia's first FlowRider installation. During park hours the ride operates in bodyboard mode where groups of 15 riders share a 30-minute session on the ride. After park hours, stand-up boarding is made available for a 12 rider, hour-long session. The ride is a Wave Loch FlowRider. FlowRider was permanently closed during the park's closure during the COVID-19 pandemic.
- Grand Prix was a go-kart track which operated from 1982 to 1992. The exact reason for the removal of this ride is still unknown, however it was possibly due to lack of popularity. The track was located beneath the Thunderbolt roller coaster.

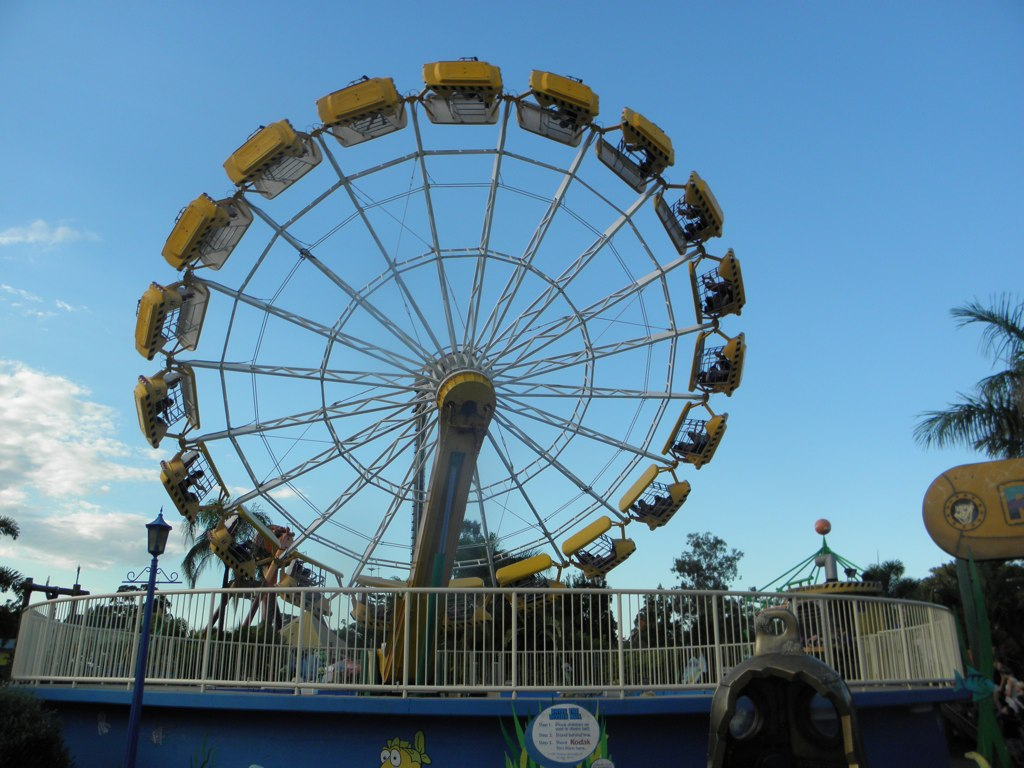
Reef Diver

- Reef Diver was a SDC Enterprise which was painted bright yellow to stand out along with its Ocean Parade theming. The ride reaches speeds of up to 60 kilometres per hour (37 mph), and is suitable for guests 1 year of age and over (guests under 4 years of age must be accompanied by an adult). Riders can experience g-forces up to 3g, reaching a height of 18.3 metres (60 ft). The ride opened in 1983 as Enterprise. Reef Diver closed on 28 April 2014 and was replaced with Tail Spin.
- Rock Climbing Wall was situated next to the Wipeout and was an ideal family attraction. Guests pay $5 to have a session on one of five different rock walls. It opened at the same time as The Claw, in September 2004.
- Stingray was a rotating ride featuring controlled lifting and tilting movements with a capacity for 36 riders per dispatch. The ride is a Trabant manufactured by Chance Rides. It was originally known as the Roulette when it opened in 1983. It remained under that name until 1993 when Ocean Parade opened and it was rethemed to suit the beach theme. Stingray closed in May 2012 and was relocated.
- Thunderbolt was Dreamworld's original roller coaster which opened in 1982 and was closed on 8 August 2003. The Thunderbolt also originally had a Go-Kart track operating next to the roller coaster.
- Vortex was a park-model Gravitron. It was removed on 2 February 2009 to make way for the new Alien vs. Predator themed Laser Skirmish attraction named AVPX. The Vortex operated under the name Gravitron until 2002, when it was renamed to fit the Ocean parade theming. It was suitable for guests 1 year of age and over (guests under 4 years of age must be accompanied by an adult).

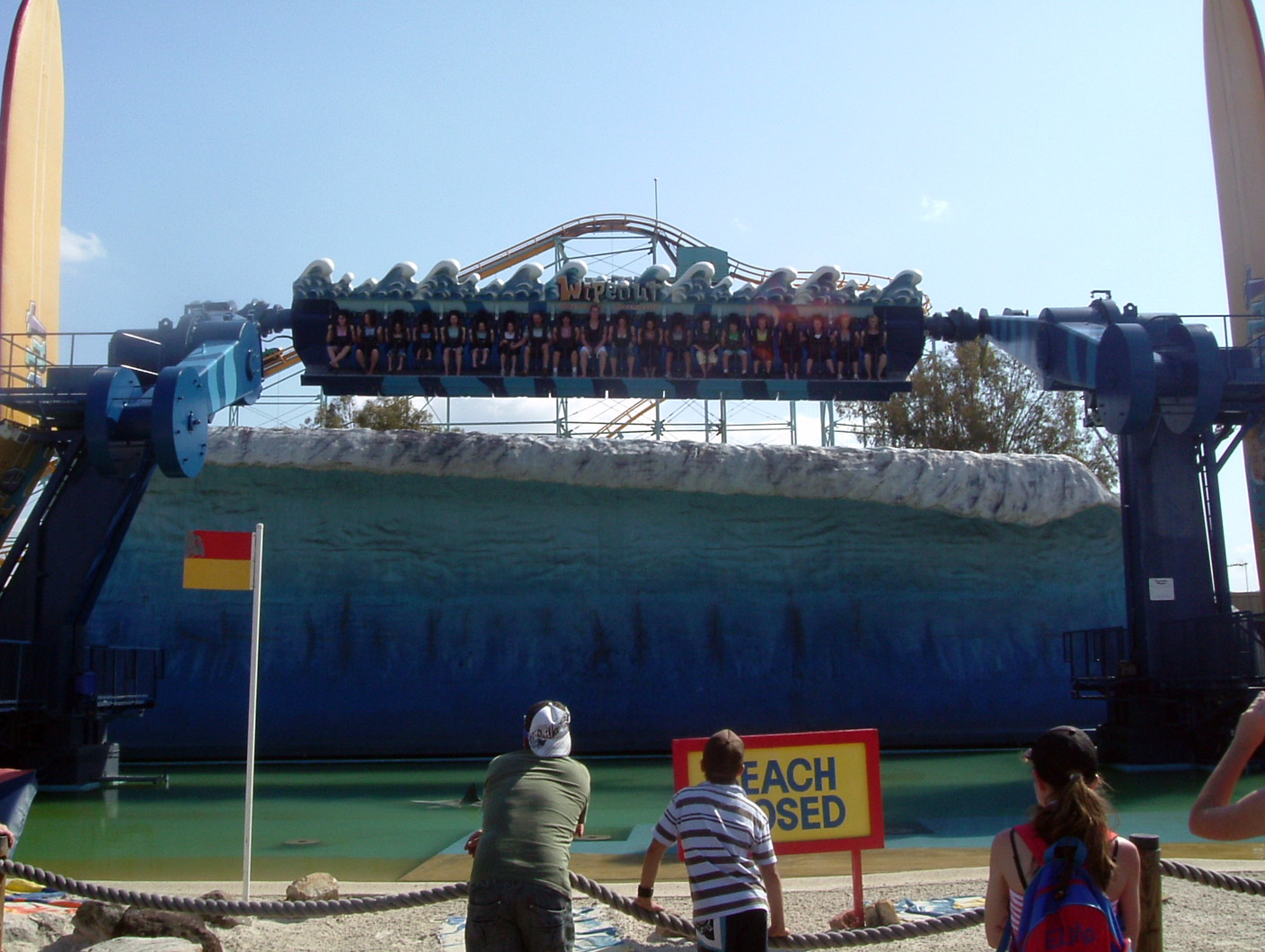
Wipeout

- Wipeout was a Vekoma Waikiki Wave Super Flip, costing A$6 million opened in 1993 with the opening of the Ocean Parade precinct. It is capable of handling 40 riders at a time with ride cycles lasting 2.5 minutes. A minimum of 20 riders must be met before the ride can be operated. In 2019, Dreamworld announced that Wipeout would be retired after over twenty years in service. Wipeout was replaced by Kickback Cove.
- V8 Supercars Red Line was Australia's first full-motion virtual V8 Supercars experience. For a cost of $10, drivers can race against 3 other drivers (in other simulators) as well as 21 computer drivers. V8 Supercars Red Line closed in October 2019.
- Zombie Evilution was a themed indoor laser skirmish attraction that replaced AVPX The attraction was originally introduced as a scare maze before being converted to a laser skirmish attraction. It opened on Friday the 13th of September 2013, replacing AVPX. In 2015 the attraction ran only during School Holidays as the Laser Tag and ran as a scare maze during the Screamworld events.

== Shopping & Dining ==
Ocean Parade features many beach themed merchandise and dining outlets. Merchandise can be purchased from:

- Surf Central — surf themed store with brands from Billabong, Rip Curl, Roxy and Quicksilver
- Shaka Shack — beach themed merchandise store with clothing and accessories from Billabong, Rip Curl, Roxy and Quicksilver

Food & beverage items can be purchased at:

- Barrels Burgers Bar — gourmet burger restaurant and licensed bar
- The Hot Dog Stand — seasonal foot long Hot Dogs stand

== Character Appearances ==
Throughout the day, characters will be appearing between Kickback Cove and The Hot Dog Cart for photo opportunities.

- Kenny Koala (Dreamworld's original mascot)
- Belinda Brown (Dreamworld's 1983 mascot)
