= Cyclone Sam's =

Ride at Worlds of Fun

Cyclone Sam's Cloudpoofer 2000
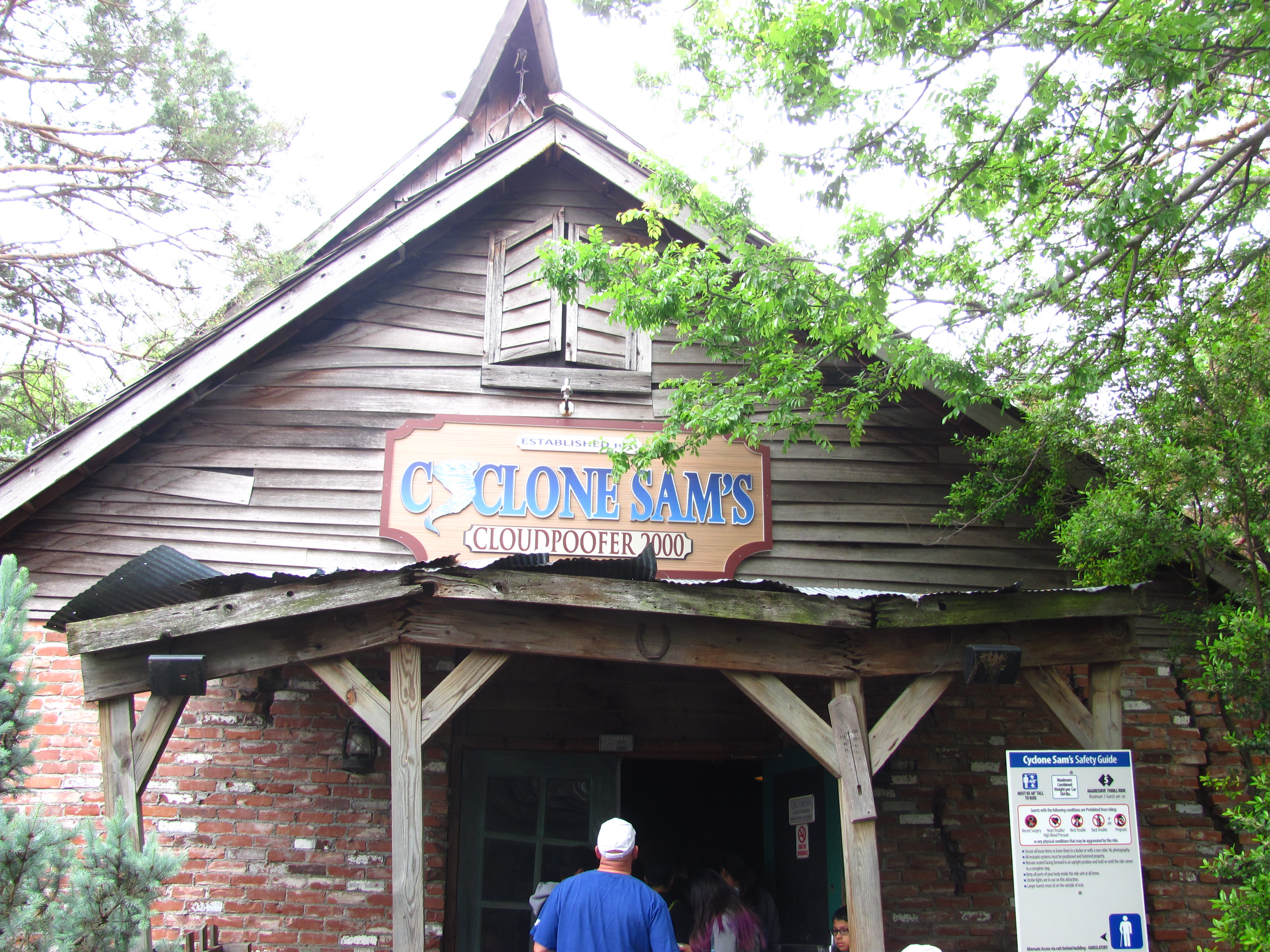
- Exterior of Cyclone Sam's in 2015

Worlds of Fun
- Area: Wild West
- Coordinates: 39.1730°N 94.488°W
- Status: Operating
- Opening date: April 1, 1995
- Replaced: Wobble Wheel

Ride statistics
- Attraction type: Wipeout
- Manufacturer: Chance Rides
- Theme: Tornado
- Vehicles: 1
- Riders per vehicle: 40
- Rows: 20
- Riders per row: 2
- Duration: 2:30
- Height restriction: 48 in (122 cm)

Cyclone Sam's Cloudpoofer 2000 is an indoor Wipeout attraction at Worlds of Fun amusement park in Kansas City, Missouri, United States. Cyclone Sam's officially opened to the public on April 1, 1995.

== History ==
In 1977, the Wobble Wheel, a Trabant ride manufactured by Chance Rides, was introduced to the park. The outdoor attraction was themed to resemble an old-western style wagon wheel and featured seating arrangements of two-person passenger rows facing the same direction. The Wobble Wheel was similar in design and operation to Cyclone Sam's, as it was capable of spinning and elevating in the air. The Wobble Wheel was removed from operation in 1993 and was temporarily replaced by a Ford Manufacturing exhibit for one season. This exhibit was subsequently replaced in 1995 by Cyclone Sam's.

== Ride experience ==
Video of ride cycle in 2023

Cyclone Sam's Cloudpoofer 2000 is located within a building that is themed as a barn that appears to have been struck by a tornado. Guests enter an indoor queue area that previously included a video presentation featuring a 1930s-era scientist introducing the ride as his new invention.

The ride is themed to the effects of a storm and features a circular Chance Wipeout ride that elevates guests to heights of up to 30 feet. Riders experience a series of strong accelerations and varying forces as the ride rotates and tilts, mimicking the chaotic nature of a tornado. The attraction utilizes various special effects, including wind, lighting, fog, and sound effects, as well as video, to enhance the overall experience.

Cyclone Sam's Cloudpoofer 2000 accommodates up to 40 guests in 20 two-person passenger rows, with the rows facing each other. Each row is equipped with a shared lap bar and individual seat belts to secure riders during the experience.
