= Sunway Lagoon =

Theme park in Sunway City, Subang Jaya, Selangor, Malaysia

- View from Sunway Resort Hotel.
- Interactive map of Sunway Lagoon
- Location: Sunway City, Subang Jaya, Selangor, Malaysia, Subang Jaya, Selangor, Malaysia
- Coordinates: 3°4′8.9″N 101°36′24.3″E
- Public transit: BRT: Bus Rapid Transit (electric bus) Sunway Line. Nearest station is Sunway Lagoon (Surf Beach Entrance)
- Opened: 29 April 1993
- Owner: Jeffrey Cheah
- Operated by: Sunway Lagoon Sdn. Bhd.
- Theme: Water Park, X Park, Amusement Park, Captain Quack Land, SDG Walk, Scream Park, Sunway Lost Lagoon, Wildlife Park
- Slogan: Awesome Moments
- Operating season: Year-round
- Area: 88 acres (36 ha)

Attractions
- Total: More than 90
- Roller coasters: 2
- Water rides: 28
- Website: Official website

Sunway Lagoon is an amusement park in Sunway City, Subang Jaya, Selangor, Malaysia. Owned by the Sunway Group, it officially opened on 29 April 1993.

== History ==
The park began operating in 24 October 1992. and was officially opened by former Prime Minister of Malaysia, Mahathir Mohamad, on 29 April 1993.

In 2007 two additional sections opened: Extreme Park (early 2007, with 8 attractions, followed by 9 more attractions. Renamed to X Park from 2022) and Wildlife Interactive Zoo (opened in late 2007, houses more than 90 species. Renamed to Wildlife Zoo with more than 150 species).

In April 2008, Scream Park was introduced in collaboration with Lynton V. Harris.

In Water Park, the Tube Slide was removed to make way for the Vuvuzela, which opened in 2013 as the world's largest vortex waterslide during that time. Also added is FlowRider Surf Simulator in 2010; and Waterplexx 5D in 2012. Gang Slide was removed sometime in 2014.

In July 2013, Buffallo Bill Coaster removed and is shifted to Lost World of Tambun. The ride is renamed to Lupe's Adventure.

In October 2013, Sunway Lagoon launched its Halloween-themed festival, Nights of Fright.

Sometime in 2015, two white lions, Zola and Zuri, were added to the Wildlife Park.

Nickelodeon Lost Lagoon water park opened on February 3 2016 with 13/14 rides.

Due to the COVID-19 pandemic in Malaysia, the park was closed on 18 March 2020 and reopened on 4 July 2020 after it achieved compliance with Ministry of Health's standard operating procedures.

On February 24th 2021, Sunway Lagoon is considering to open Night Park.

Sunway Lagoon opened Night Park: The Good, The Bad and The Wild on 16 November 2022.

In 2024, Sunway refurbished its Night Park to make way for Captain Quack Land.

Captain Quack Land was launched on 20th December 2024.

Nine years later, the long-awaited 280-meter track RM30 million Wild Chase Water Coaster opened to public on 10 May 2025.

== Attractions ==
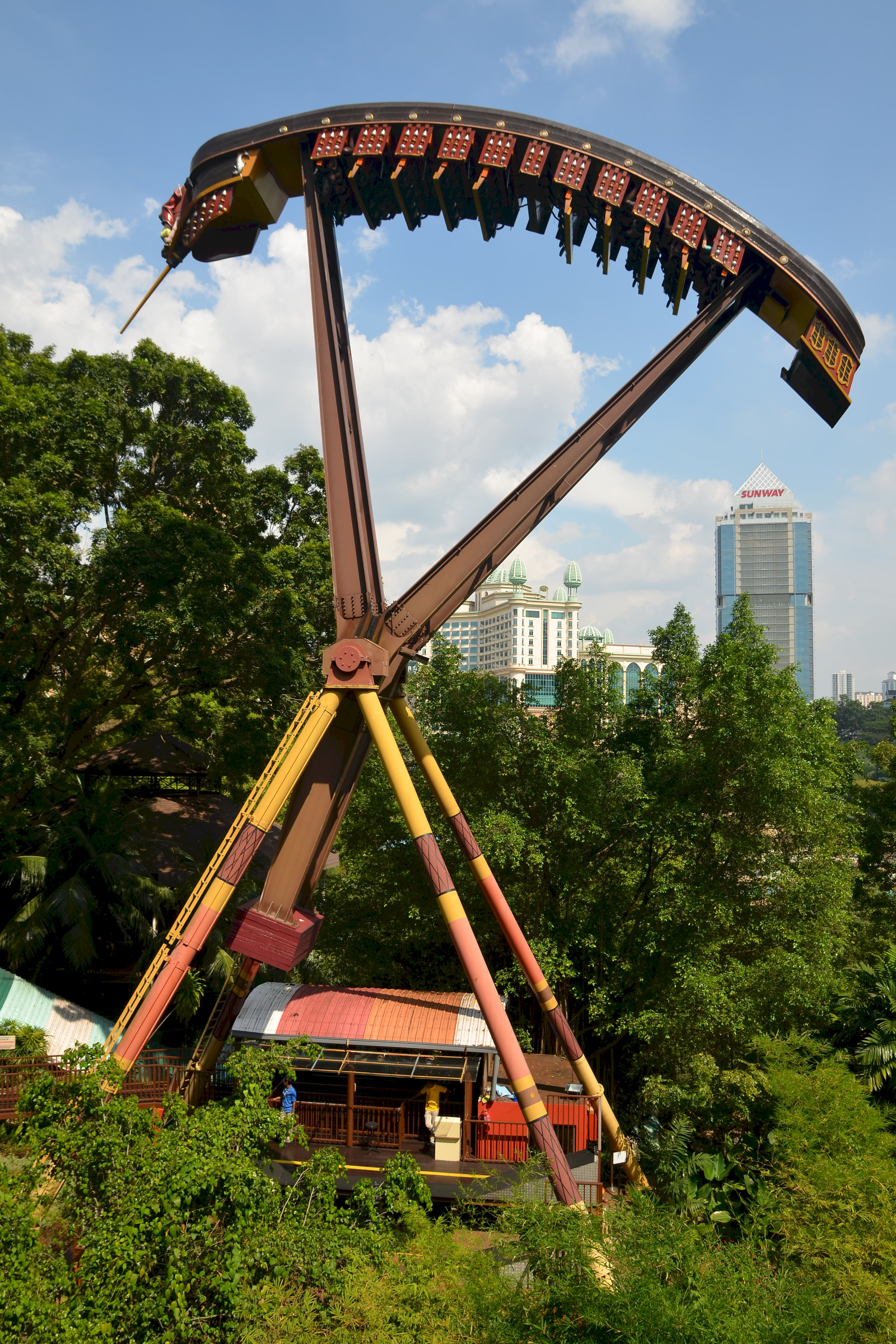
The Pirate Ship ride

The Wildlife Park is an interactive zoo that houses over 150 species. The animal sanctuaries within the park have distinct names, including Pet Village, Jungle Trail, and Bird Savannah.

It opened in 2016 as Nickelodeon Lost Lagoon, a Nickelodeon-themed and features 14 rides.

== Events ==
Sunway Lagoon has hosted MTV World Stage (2009 to 2015) Other performers include deadmau5 and Pitbull (2017).

== Incidents ==
On 20 November 1997, a woman died in a fall from the “Runaway Train" roller coaster after the safety bar and belt failed. Local authorities ordered the immediate closure of the park to investigate the incident. Sunway Lagoon was instructed to suspend Runaway Train operations until safety measures were reviewed and implemented.

It was alleged that up to 870 people were affected by a food poisoning incident at a family day event organised by Sunway Lagoon for the Malaysian Communications and Multimedia Commission on 4 October 2025. After a police report and health report was lodged by MCMC, Sunway Lagoon's food and beverage department was ordered to be closed between 7 and 21 October for cleaning and disinfection. On 5 November, it was reported that the Health Department had yet to release its findings of its investigations of the incident. The Selangor Health Department stated on 7 November that 322 people suffered diarrhoea, vomiting and stomach pains. Further investigations found that the incident was caused by food pollution, long storage of cooked food before serving, food contamination at the kitchen. In April 2026, MCMC filed a lawsuit claiming 1.8 million MYR in damages, claiming that the park "failed to ensure strict compliance with all food safety, sanitary and hygiene standards and the food and beverages supplied were satisfactory quality and safe for human consumption". The park defended that the allegations were speculative and the alleged incident happened after the conclusion of its event.

On 23 August 2026, an accident involving the activation of the emergency braking system, caused the roller coaster in the theme park to stop abruptly, leading to 10 visitors injured. 22 visitors were on the ride at that time. The lack of direct mention of Sunway Lagoon in the initial press coverage of the accident had also drawn criticism and allegations that the theme park "was great at hushing up the story."

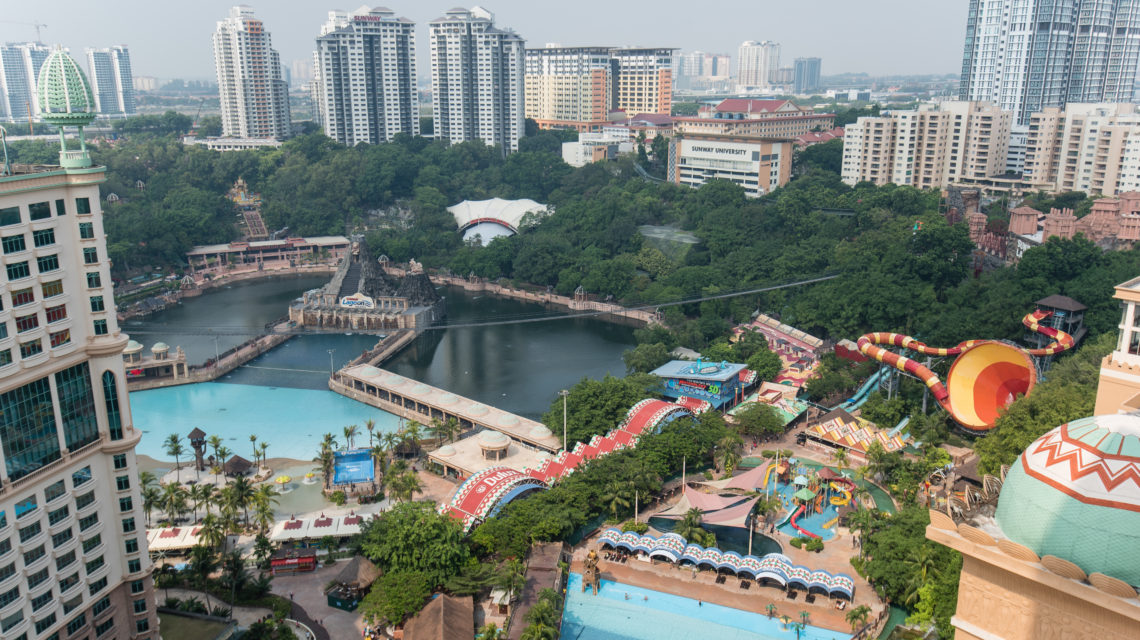
Sunway Lagoon between 2016-2019 with Nickelodeon Lost Lagoon.

== Awards ==
- 2024: No 1, Entertainment and Leisure Category by Talentbank Graduates‘ Choice of Employer Awards 2024
- 2023: No 1, Entertainment and Leisure Category by Talentbank Graduates‘ Choice of Employer Awards 2023
- 2022: Silver Award, Entertainment Category by Putra Brand Awards 2024
- 2021: Family Theme Park (Gold) by Trusted Brand Award 2021
- 2020: 2020 People’s Choice Gold Putra Brand Awards in the Entertainment Category by Putra Brand Awards 2020 (Star Media Group)
- 2019: Silver Awards – Entertainment Category by Putra Brand Awards 2019
- 2018: Nation Branding Award 2017 – 2018 by The BrandLaureate 2017
- 2017: Best Attraction 2017 by Expatriate Lifestyle’s Best of Malaysia Awards 2017
- 2016: 2016 People’s Choice Bronze Putra Brand Awards in the Entertainment Category by Putra Brand Awards
- 2015: Silver Award in the Entertainment Category at the Putra Brand Awards 2015.
- 2014: 2014 Putra Brand Award (Silver) in the Entertainment category.
- 2012: Best Attraction/ Tourism Experience Excellence Award by Expatriate Lifestyle.
- 2011: Brand Speciality Awards BrandLaureate – SMEs Chapter Awards 2011 for Most Creative Brand, organised by Asia Pacific Brands Foundation (APBF).
- 2011: Malaysia Achievement Awards 2011 – Hall of Fame Awards under ASEAN's Most Recognisable Brand; Theme Park & Attraction 2010, Asia's Best Attraction 2010 and Asia's Best Waterpark 2010 category.
- 2010: Asia's Best Water Park Award 2011 by the International Amusement Parks and Attractions Association (IAAPA).
- 2010: Asian Attraction Expo 2010 in Asia's Best Attraction award by the International Association of Amusement Parks and Attractions (IAAPA).
- 2009: BrandLaureate SMEs Chapter Award in Best Brand in Corporate Building – Leisure – Theme Park.
- 2009: Asia's Best Attraction 2009 (Medium Attraction Category) at International Association of Amusement Parks & Attractions (IAAPA).
- 2008: Asia's Best Attractions 2008 Awards (Medium Category) at International Association of Amusement Parks and Attractions (IAAPA).
- 2007: Best Asian Attractions Awards 2007.
- 1993: FIABCI – Malaysia Property Award 2000 for Best Leisure Development.
