= Wipeout (Dreamworld) =

Defunct Vekoma Waikiki Wave Super Flip

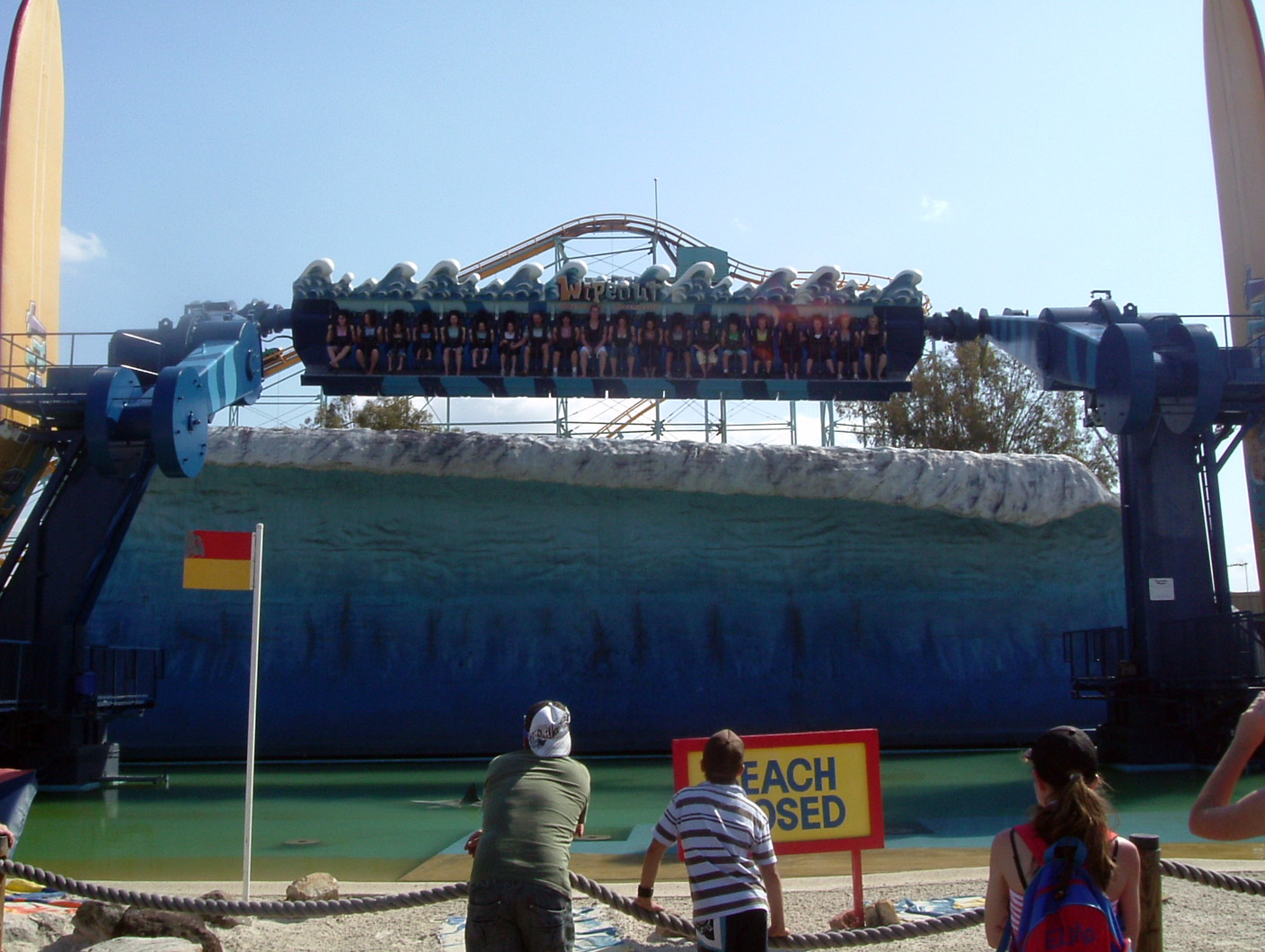

Dreamworld
- Area: Ocean Parade
- Coordinates: 27°51′52.16″S 153°18′57.69″E
- Status: Removed
- Cost: A$6,000,000
- Opening date: 26 December 1993
- Closing date: 8 March 2019
- Replaced by: Kickback Cove

Ride statistics
- Attraction type: Waikiki Wave Super Flip
- Manufacturer: Vekoma
- Height: 15 m (49 ft)
- G-force: 4
- Capacity: 480 riders per hour
- Vehicles: 1
- Riders per vehicle: 40
- Rows: 2
- Riders per row: 20
- Duration: 2:30
- Height restriction: 120 cm (3 ft 11 in)
- Maximum Height: 200 cm (6 ft 7 in)
- Ride Express was available

The Wipeout was a Vekoma Waikiki Wave Super Flip at Dreamworld on the Gold Coast, Queensland, Australia. The opening of this ride in 1993 caused part of Country Fair to be rethemed to Ocean Parade.

== History ==
On 26 December 1993, Dreamworld opened its tenth themed area, Ocean Parade. The area took over the northern portion of the existing Country Fair themed area. Ocean Parade's flagship attraction was the $6 million Wipeout. The ride was the world's first Vekoma Waikiki Wave Super Flip – a ride similar to a traditional Top Spin. At the same time, the Roulette was rethemed to become the Stingray and relocated to a new location.

The ride experience has been modified several times throughout its lifetime. The most major modifications occurred in the latter half of 2007. Due to water restrictions and the deterioration of the ride, the original lagoon was drained. Previously the lagoon featured water jets and an animatronic shark, named Fluffy, that would circle underneath. Between 3 February 2014 and 28 July 2014, the Wipeout was closed for a major refurbishment including a repainting and return of the water jets and other effects.

After Huracán's closure in 2017, Wipeout was the last Waikiki Wave Super Flips still operating. In 2017, the capacity for the ride went from 40 riders to 20 riders per vehicle due to unreliable ride operations.

=== Closure ===
On 8 March 2019, Dreamworld announced that the ride would be retired and dismantled, and won't re-open from its maintenance period. Wipeout was closed after 25 years of operation due to several maintenance issues and continued unreliable ride operations. It was replaced by Kickback Cove in November 2019.

== Experience ==
By first looks, the ride is an ordinary top spin, though the ride is based on the top spin style of ride but features a main difference. One of the arms can bend to allow for diagonal twists and turns rather than only horizontal. The bending arm allows for one side of the ride to travel in a clockwise direction, with the other in a counter-clockwise direction. The ride first starts off by going straight up and down, then swings at the top three times then goes back down straight and up again. Then it locks into position and the two arms start to move and go in the opposite direction to each other and the gondola goes upside down and back up another two times, on the third time it does it, and it flips all the way round twice once or sometimes not at all. Then the ride goes in every way possible swinging passengers around (but not upside down) and keeps going and then it slows down at the front of the ride and the left arm stops while the right arm goes around and then the other starts to go again and goes around once and stops at the wave and locks. After 10 seconds the gondola locks and both arms go very slowly in the same direction all the way to the way to the top very slowly locked upside down and then releases and does another back-flip, and swings back and forth till it gets to the top. Once at the top on good days it will lock upside down and on other days it does two big swings and then both arms go in the same direction all the way and the brakes are applied and goes back and docks.

== Incidents ==
- In 2000, a gearbox problem left riders stranded.
