= MTV World Stage Live in Malaysia =

Concert series (2007–2015)

MTV World Stage Malaysia
- Status: Defunct
- Genre: Concert
- Frequency: Annually
- Locations: Sunway Lagoon, Bandar Sunway, Selangor; I-City, Shah Alam, Selangor (2011 edition)
- Country: Malaysia
- Years active: 2007–2015
- Inaugurated: 2007
- Most recent: 2015
- Organiser: MTV Asia

MTV World Stage Live In Malaysia was a concert series in Malaysia from 2007 to 2015.

On August 15, 2009, MTV Asia staged an outdoor concert at Sunway Lagoon resort in Kuala Lumpur. The event was attended by over 15,000 people and featured a real-time microblogging application where comments and 'tweets' via SMS were displayed on giant screens at the concert venue. The six-hour-long concert was edited into a two-hour special that aired on MTV Asia on August 28, 2009.

== Artist lineups ==
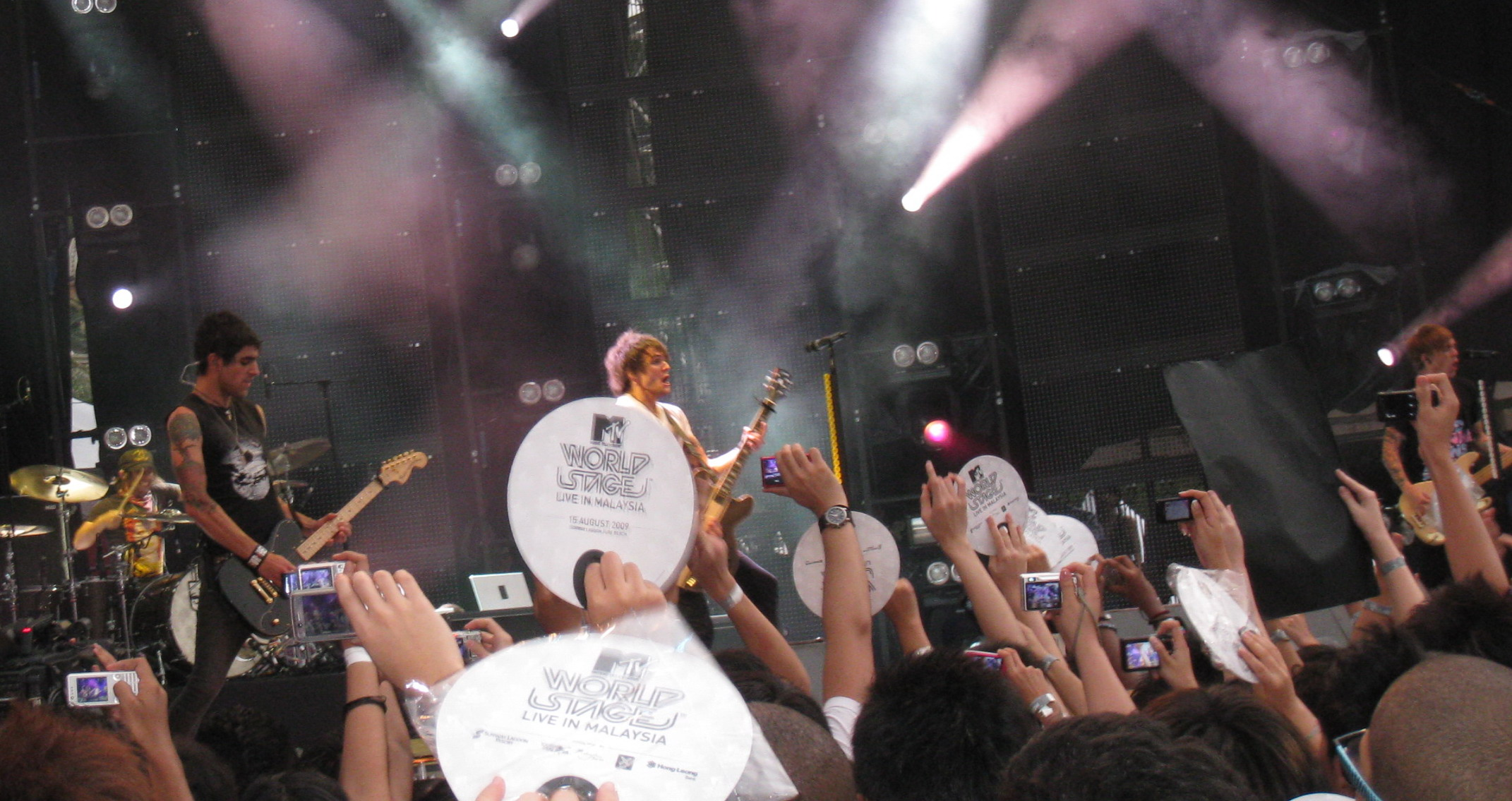
Boys Like Girls performing at MTV World Stage Live In Malaysia

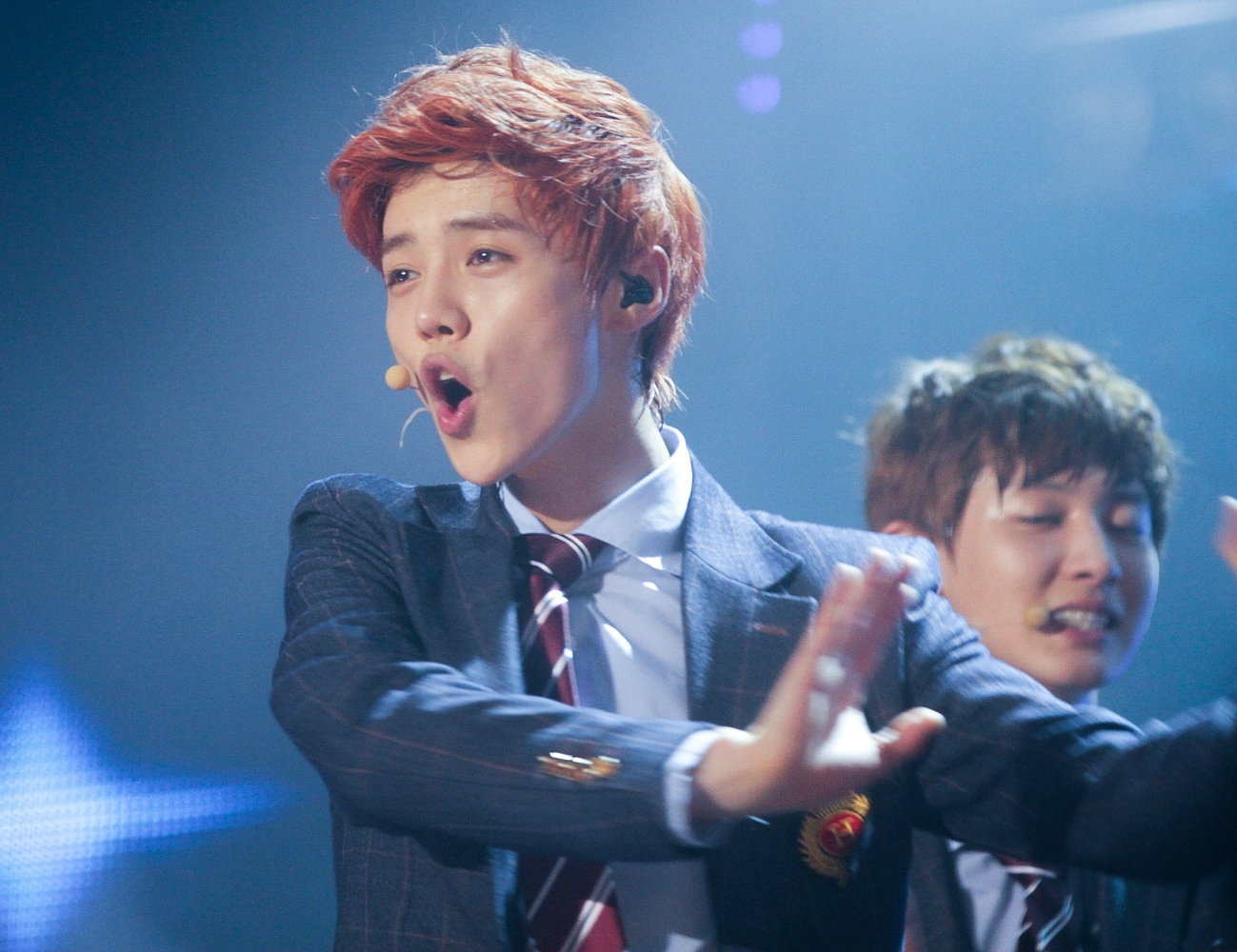
Luhan of EXO at the 2013 MTV World Stage Live in Malaysia

| Year | Lineups | Attendance | Venue |
|---|---|---|---|
| 2009 | Kasabian; The All-American Rejects; Boys Like Girls; Pixie Lott; Hoobastank; Raygun; Estranged (Malaysian Band); Misha Omar (Malaysian Act); Korean boyband 2AM also made a special guest appearance at the post party of the event. | 15,000 | Surf Beach, Sunway Lagoon, Subang Jaya |
| 2010 | Katy Perry; Tokio Hotel; Bunkface (Malaysian band); Wonder Girls (South Korean girl band) | - | Surf Beach, Sunway Lagoon, Subang Jaya |
| 2011 | Thirty Seconds to Mars; Neon Trees; Pop Shuvit (Malaysian band); BEAST (South Korean boy band) | - | I-City, Shah Alam |
| 2012 | Jay Park; Justin Bieber; Mizz Nina (Malaysian singer); KARA (South Korean girl band) | 16,000 | Surf Beach, Sunway Lagoon, Subang Jaya |
| 2013 | Robin Thicke; Far East Movement; Joe Flizzow (Malaysian rapper); Exo (South Korean-Chinese boy band) | 15,000 | Surf Beach, Sunway Lagoon, Subang Jaya |
| 2014 | Yuna (Malaysian singer); Boys Republic (South Korean band); B.o.B; Thaitanium (Thai-American hip hop music) | 10,000 | Surf Beach, Sunway Lagoon, Subang Jaya |
| 2015 | Stacy (Malaysian Act); Apink (South Korean band); Carly Rae Jepsen (International Act); Jason Derulo (International Act); Sekai no Owari (International Act); (The Malaysian act was determined by fans vote through MTV Asia website and Twitter between 30 July-14 August 2015.) | 20,000 | Surf Beach, Sunway Lagoon, Subang Jaya |

== See also ==
- MTV Southeast Asia
