= Isle of MTV =

Annual music festival in Europe

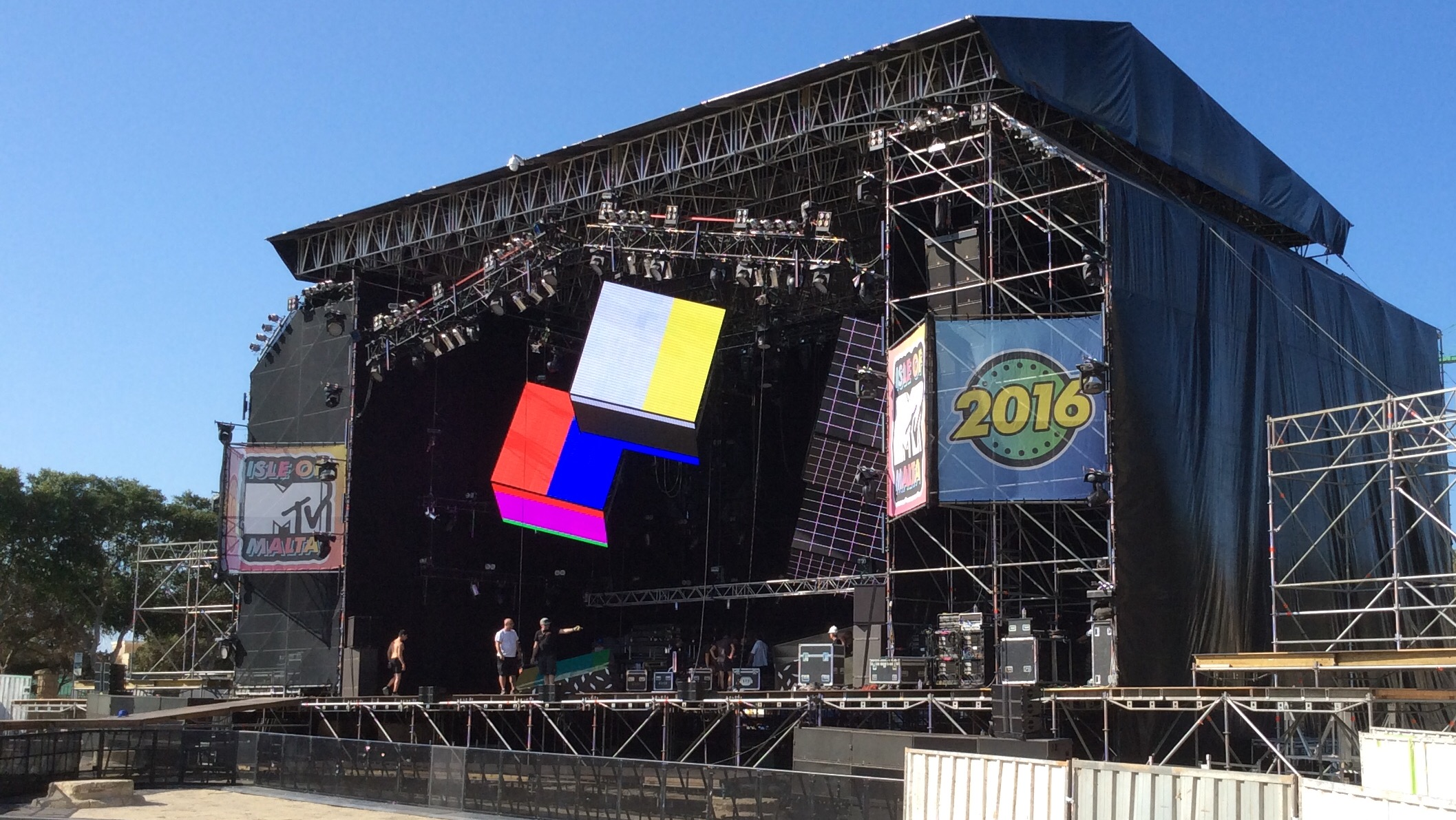
- Stage preparations on 26 June 2016
- Genre: Electronic music, Pop, Hip-hop, Rapcore, Alternative rock
- Dates: June or July
- Locations: Lisbon, Portugal (2002); Six-Fours-les-Plages, France (2003); Tossa de Mar, Spain (2004); Trieste, Italy (2005); Floriana, Malta (since 2007)
- Years active: 2002–present
- Attendance: 50,000
- Website: www.isleofmtv.com

Isle of MTV is an annual music festival organized by MTV, which is part of Paramount. A key fixture in Europe's festival calendar, it has been held in Malta since 2007 while previous editions were held in Portugal, France, Spain and Italy. Now in its 15th year, Isle of MTV is Europe's largest free festival and is annually attended by tens of thousands of people. Fans can register for tickets via isleofmtv.com

The one-night festival is organized annually in July. It begins at 18:00 and ends before midnight. Malta Public Transport runs special bus routes on the day to facilitate travel.

== By year ==
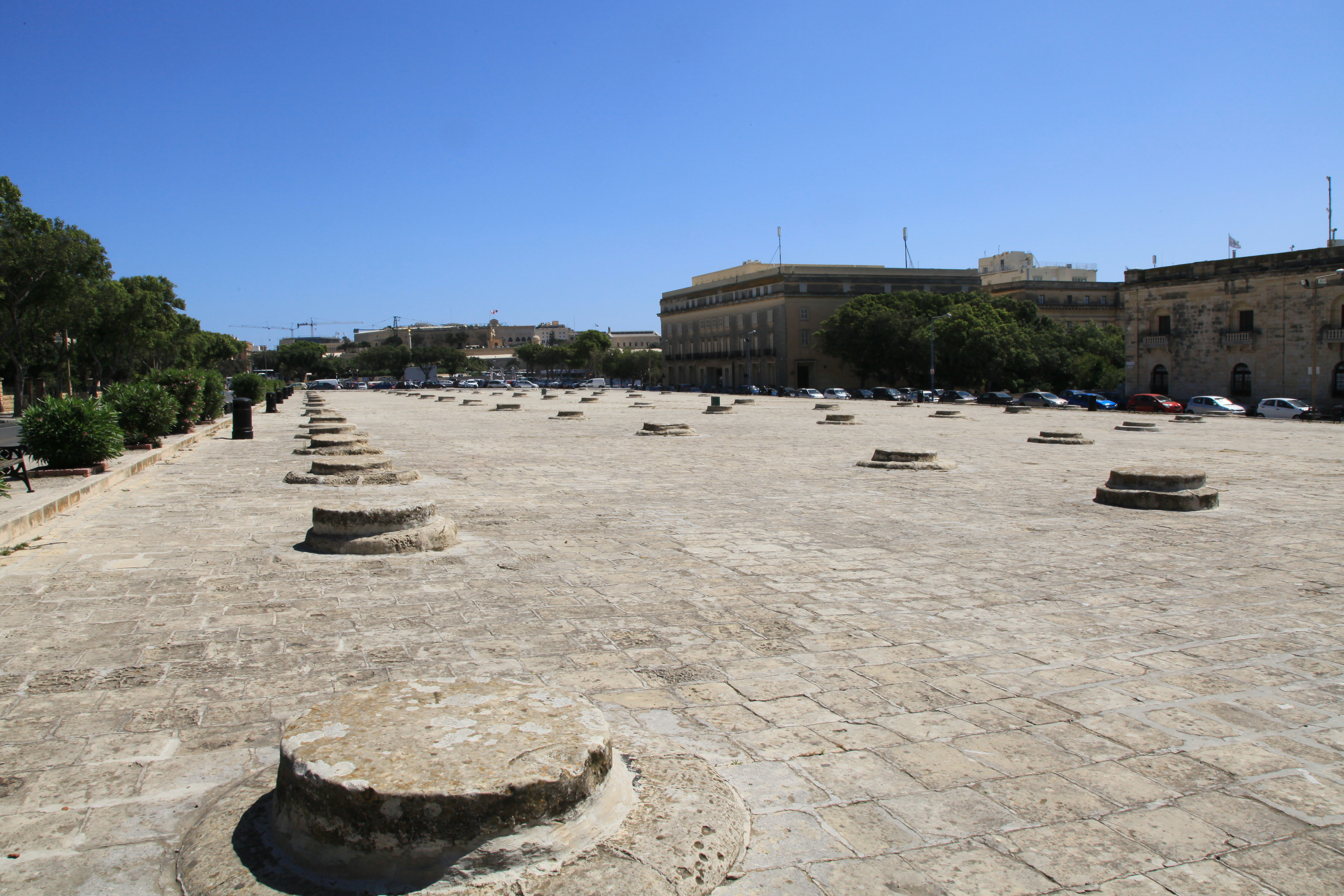
The Isle of MTV has been held at the Granaries in Floriana, Malta since 2007.

=== 2002 ===
The 2002 edition was held at the Apollo in HammersmithThe line-up was as follows:

- Gorillaz
- Morcheeba
- Rui da Silva
- Rui Vargas
- Erick Morillo
- Roger Sanchez
- Da Weasel
- Layo & Bushwacka!
- Kelis

=== 2003 ===
The 2003 edition was held at Île Gaou in Six-Fours-les-Plages, France.

=== 2004 ===
The 2004 edition was held at Platja Gran in Tossa de Mar on the Costa Brava, Spain. The line-up was as follows:

- The Black Eyed Peas
- Ali B
- Amp Fiddler
- Audio Bullys
- Ca$h Money
- Chris Coco
- Ewan Pearson
- Fergie
- Gogo DJ
- James Zabiela
- Josh Wink
- Kenny "Dope" Gonzalez
- Mark Farina
- Mark Ronson
- Masters at Work
- Mr. C
- Mutiny
- The Pinker Tones
- Rob da Bank
- Sander Kleinenberg
- Scratch Perverts
- Stanton Warriors
- Todd Terry
- Tim Deluxe
- Way Out West
- Yousef

=== 2005 ===
The 2005 edition was held on 14 July at Piazza Unità d'Italia in Trieste, Italy. The line-up was as follows:

- Chemical Brothers
- Garbage
- Snoop Dogg
- Meg

=== 2007 ===
The 2007 edition was held on 26 July at the Granaries in Floriana, Malta. The line-up was as follows:

- Akon
- Maroon 5
- Enrique Iglesias
- Ira Losco
- Winter Moods

=== 2008 ===
The 2008 edition was held on 25 June at the Granaries in Floriana. The line-up was as follows:

- Lady Gaga
- Enrique Iglesias
- OneRepublic
- N.E.R.D
- The Kooks

=== 2009 ===
The 2009 edition was held on 8 July at the Granaries in Floriana. The line-up was as follows:

- Lady Gaga
- The Black Eyed Peas
- Metro Station
- Esmée Denters

=== 2010 ===
The 2010 edition was held on 30 June at the Granaries in Floriana. The line-up was as follows:

- David Guetta
- Scissor Sisters
- Kid Rock
- Kelis

=== 2011 ===
The 2011 edition was held on 30 June at the Granaries in Floriana. The line-up was as follows:

- Snoop Dogg
- LMFAO
- Far East Movement
- Parade

=== 2012 ===
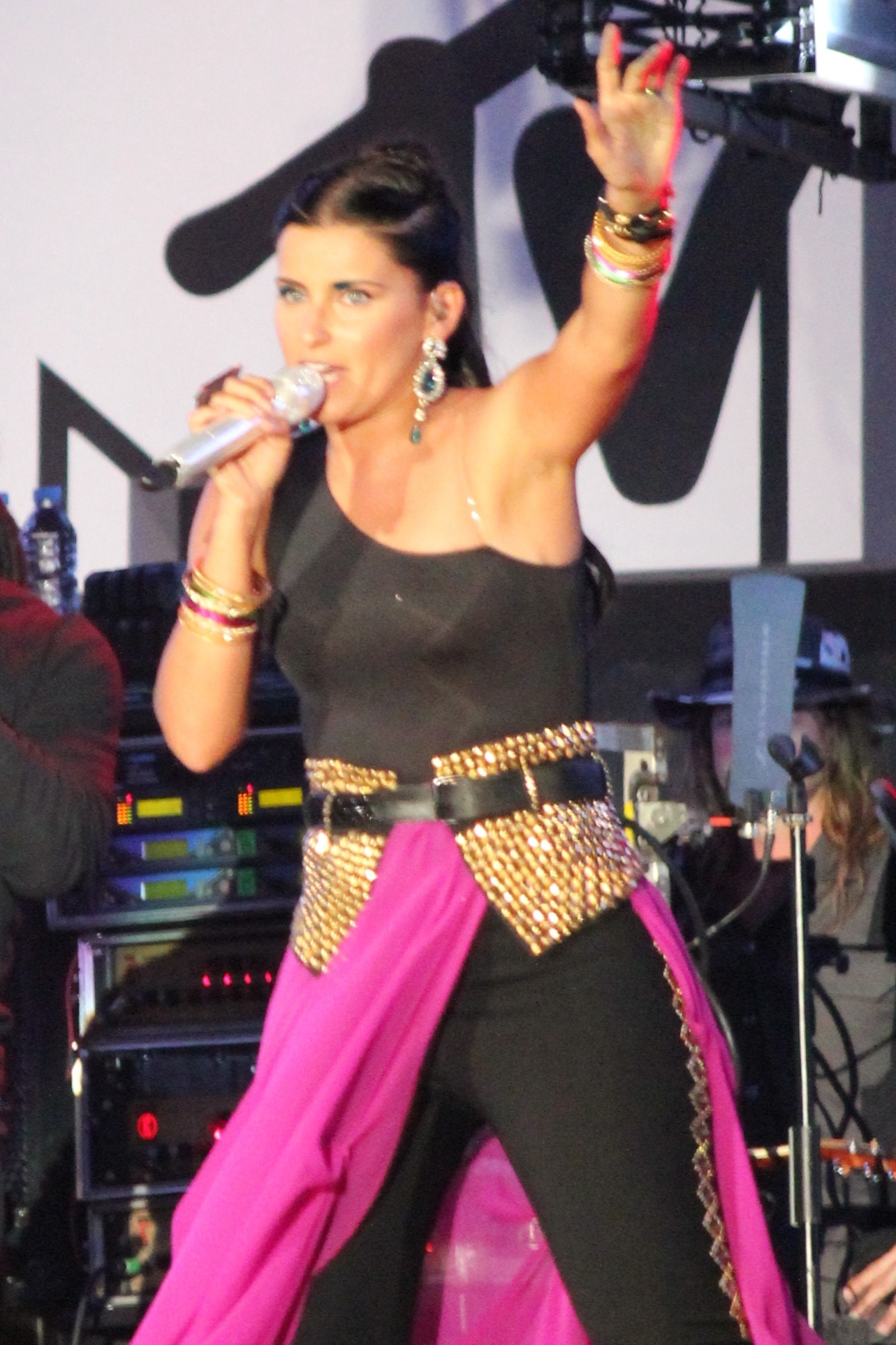
Nelly Furtado at Isle of MTV 2012

The 2012 edition was held on 26 June at the Granaries in Floriana. The line-up was as follows:

- will.i.am
- Nelly Furtado
- Flo Rida
- Eva Simons

=== 2013 ===
The 2013 edition was held on 26 June at the Granaries in Floriana. The line-up was as follows:

- Jessie J
- Rita Ora
- Afrojack
- Rudimental

=== 2014 ===
The 2014 edition was held on 25 June at the Granaries in Floriana. The line-up was as follows:

- Hardwell
- Enrique Iglesias
- Nicole Scherzinger
- Dizzee Rascal
- Kiesza
- Tenishia

=== 2015 ===
The 2015 edition was held on 7 July at the Granaries in Floriana. The line-up was as follows:

- Martin Garrix
- Jason Derulo
- Echosmith
- Tori Kelly
- OMI

=== 2016 ===
Isle of MTV information post at Auberge d'Italie

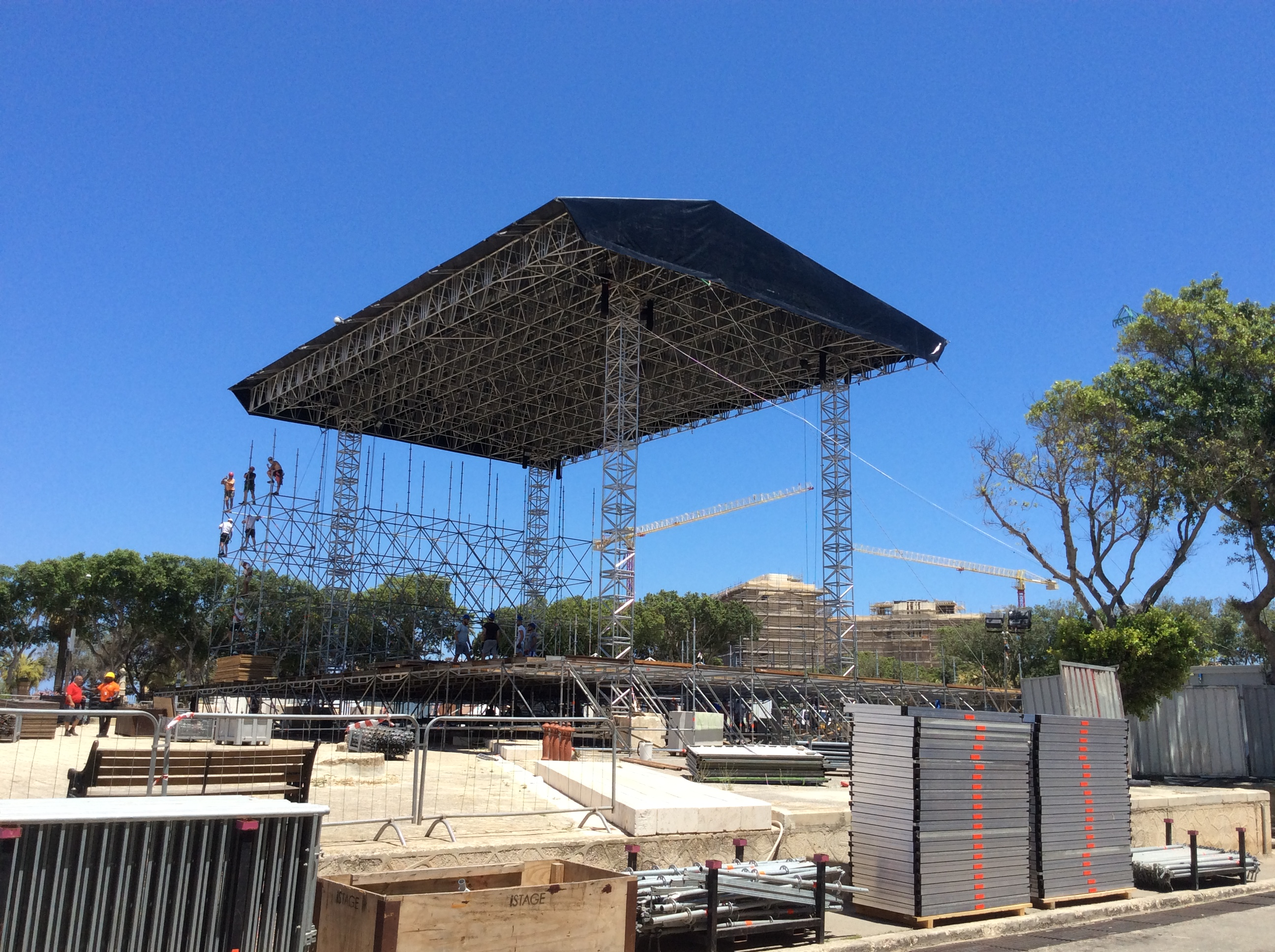
Stage preparations, days prior to the 2016 edition

The 2016 edition was held on 28 June at the Granaries in Floriana. The line-up was as follows:

- Wiz Khalifa
- Jess Glynne
- Steve Aoki
- Clean Bandit

=== 2017 ===
The 2017 edition was held on 27 June at the Granaries in Floriana. The line-up was as follows:

- Raye
- Jonas Blue
- DNCE
- The Chainsmokers

=== 2018 ===
The 2018 Isle of MTV edition took place on June 27 at the granaries in Floriana with the following musicians:

- Jason Derulo
- Dimitri Vegas & Like Mike
- Hailee Steinfeld
- Sigala
- Paloma Faith
- Ella Eyre

=== 2019 ===
The 2019 Isle of MTV was held on 9 July.

- Martin Garrix
- Bebe Rexha
- Ava Max
- Wiley

=== 2020 ===
An Isle of MTV event is not to be held in 2020 due to a number of factors including COVID-19.

=== 2021 ===
An Isle of MTV event is not to be held in 2021 due to a number of factors including COVID-19.

=== 2022 ===
The 2022 Isle of MTV was held on 19 July with the following artists:

- Marshmello
- French Montana
- bbno$
- Mae Muller
- Shaun Farrugia

=== 2023 ===
The 2023 Isle of MTV was held on 18 July 2023

- Delta Goodrem
- Mimi Webb
- Tom Grennan
- OneRepublic
- Alesso

=== 2024 ===
The 2024 Isle of MTV was held on 16 July 2024

- DJ Snake
- RAYE
- Nelly Furtado

=== 2025 ===
The 2025 Isle of MTV was held on 15 July 2025

- Alok
- Damiano David
- Ella Henderson

=== 2026 ===
Isle of MTV 2026 was held on 22 July 2026

- Katy Perry
- AIDAN
