= Reef Diver =

Defunct amusement ride at Dreamworld

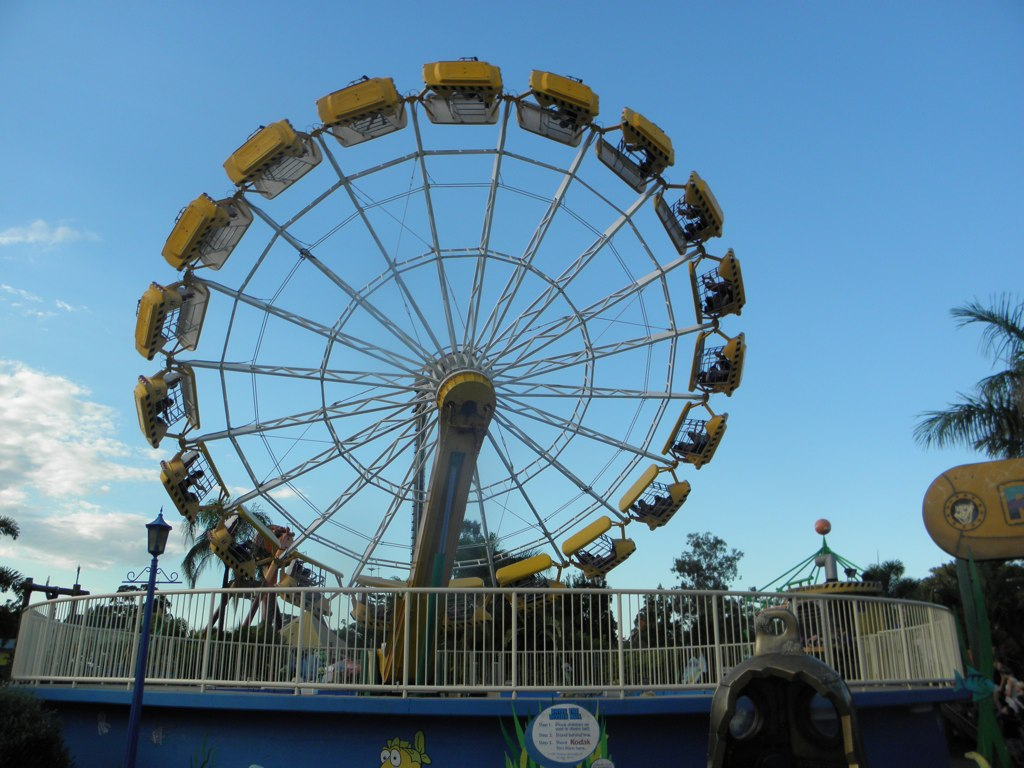

Dreamworld
- Area: Ocean Parade
- Coordinates: 27°51′53.10″S 153°18′58.76″E
- Opening date: 1983
- Closing date: 28 April 2014
- Replaced by: Tail Spin

Ride statistics
- Attraction type: Enterprise
- Manufacturer: Meisho
- Theme: Ocean
- Height: 18.3 m (60 ft)
- Speed: 60 km/h (37 mph)
- G-force: 3
- Capacity: 500 riders per hour
- Vehicles: 20
- Riders per vehicle: 2
- Height restriction: 110 cm (3 ft 7 in)
- Previous name: Enterprise
- Maximum angle: 87°

Reef Diver was an Enterprise amusement ride in the Ocean Parade section of Dreamworld on the Gold Coast, Queensland, Australia.

== History ==
Reef Diver opened in the County Fair section of Dreamworld in 1983. At that time it operated under the name Enterprise. In 2000, the actual ride from Schwarzkopf Industries was replaced with a new one from Meisho. In 2002, Ocean Parade was expanded to encompass the remaining rides in County Fair. The processed involved the renaming and retheming of the ride to Reef Diver. On 28 April 2014, Reef Diver closed and was subsequently removed.

== Ride ==
The Reef Diver is an Enterprise ride. Two riders sit inline in each of 20 gondolas arranged in an 18.3-metre (60 ft) circle. The ride spins clockwise at speeds of up to 60 km/h (37 mph), dispelling a slight amount of centrifugal force. A hydraulically powered arm underneath the ride then raises and tilts the frame so that the ride is rotating at 87° from the horizontal, transforming the ride from a horizontal experience to a nearly vertical one. The Reef Diver features no safety restraints as the centrifugal force applied to the riders is sufficient to keep them pinned in their seats. Riders can experience up to 3 times the force of gravity during the ride.
