= 2019 in amusement parks =

This is a list of events and openings related to amusement parks that occurred in 2019. These various lists are not exhaustive.

== Amusement parks ==
=== Opening ===
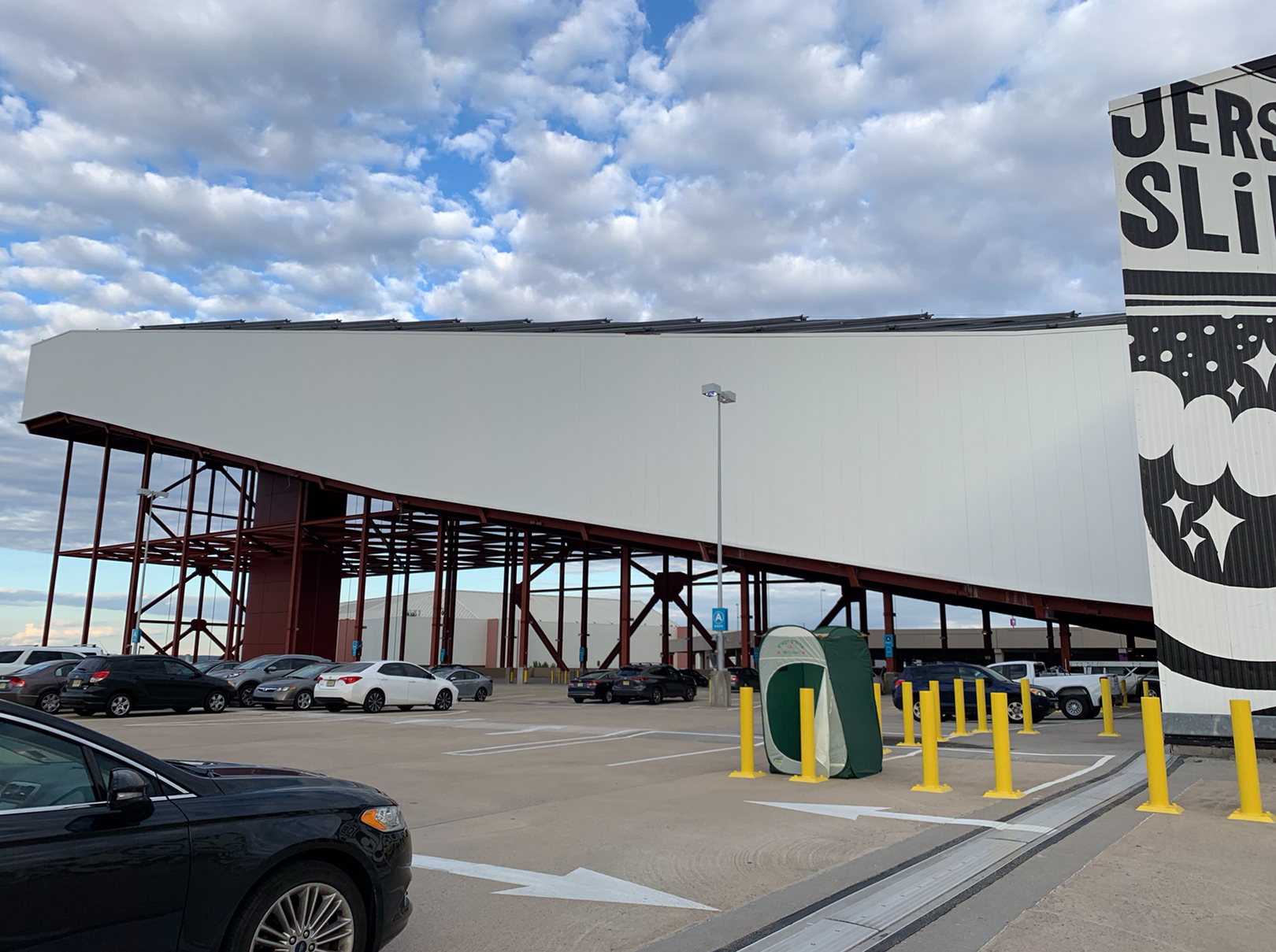
Big SNOW American Dream opened in December.

- Indonesia Atlantis Land
- Indonesia Bandung Champion City – March 24
- U.S. Big SNOW American Dream in American Dream Meadowlands – December 5
- China Guangzhou Sunac Cultural Tourism City
- China Oriental Heritage Changsha
- UAE Kidzania Abu Dhabi – June 26
- Qatar Kidzania Doha – May 1
- U.S. Kidzania Dallas – November 23
- Africa Kidzania Johannesburg
- Indonesia Kidzania Surabaya – November 2019
- China Lionsgate Entertainment World – July 31
- U.S. Nickelodeon Universe in American Dream Meadowlands – October 25
- Indonesia Panama Park 825 – Opening June 1 – Reopening September 30
- South Korea Gyeongnam Mason Robotland – September 6
- Oman Snow Park Mall Of Muscat – July 26
- Indonesia Transmart Malang – February 22
- Indonesia Trans Snow World – Juanda > March 25 – Bintaro > December 21
- Indonesia Trans Studio Bali – December 12
- Indonesia Trans Studio Cibubur – July 12
- Indonesia Trans Studio Mini Malang – February 22
- Indonesia Trans Studio Mini Tasikmalaya
- Turkey Wonderland Eurasia – March 20

=== Change of name ===
- U.S. Darien Lake Theme Park Resort » Six Flags Darien Lake
- U.S. Miracle Strip at Pier Park » Swampy Jack's Wongo Adventure
- U.S. Wet N' Wild Phoenix » Six Flags Hurricane Harbor Phoenix
- U.S. Wet N' Wild Splashtown » Six Flags Hurricane Harbor SplashTown

=== Change of ownership ===
- U.S. Schlitterbahn – The Henry family » Cedar Fair
- Belgium Comic Station Antwerp – Independent » Plopsa

=== Birthday ===
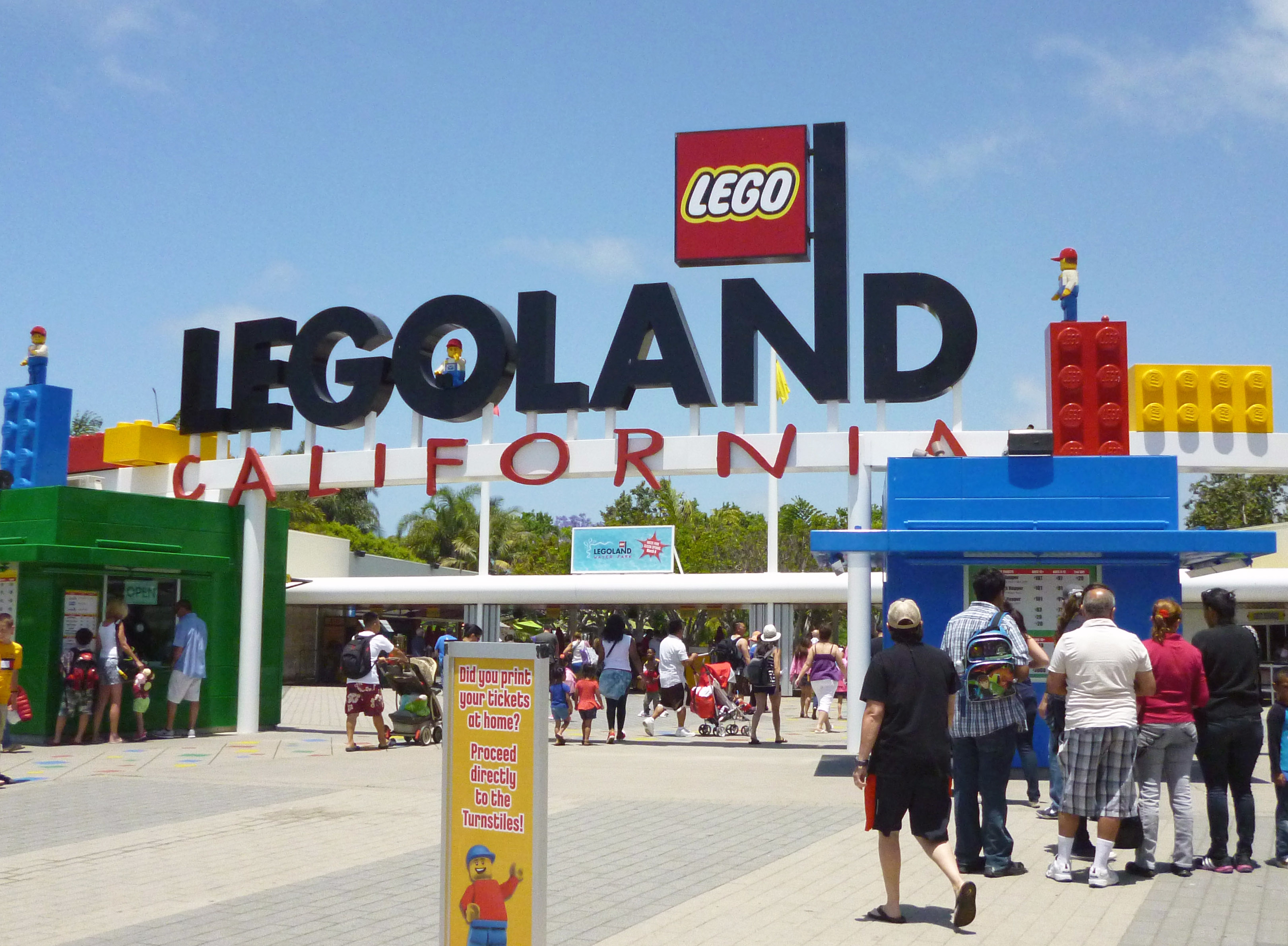
Legoland California celebrated its 20th anniversary in March.

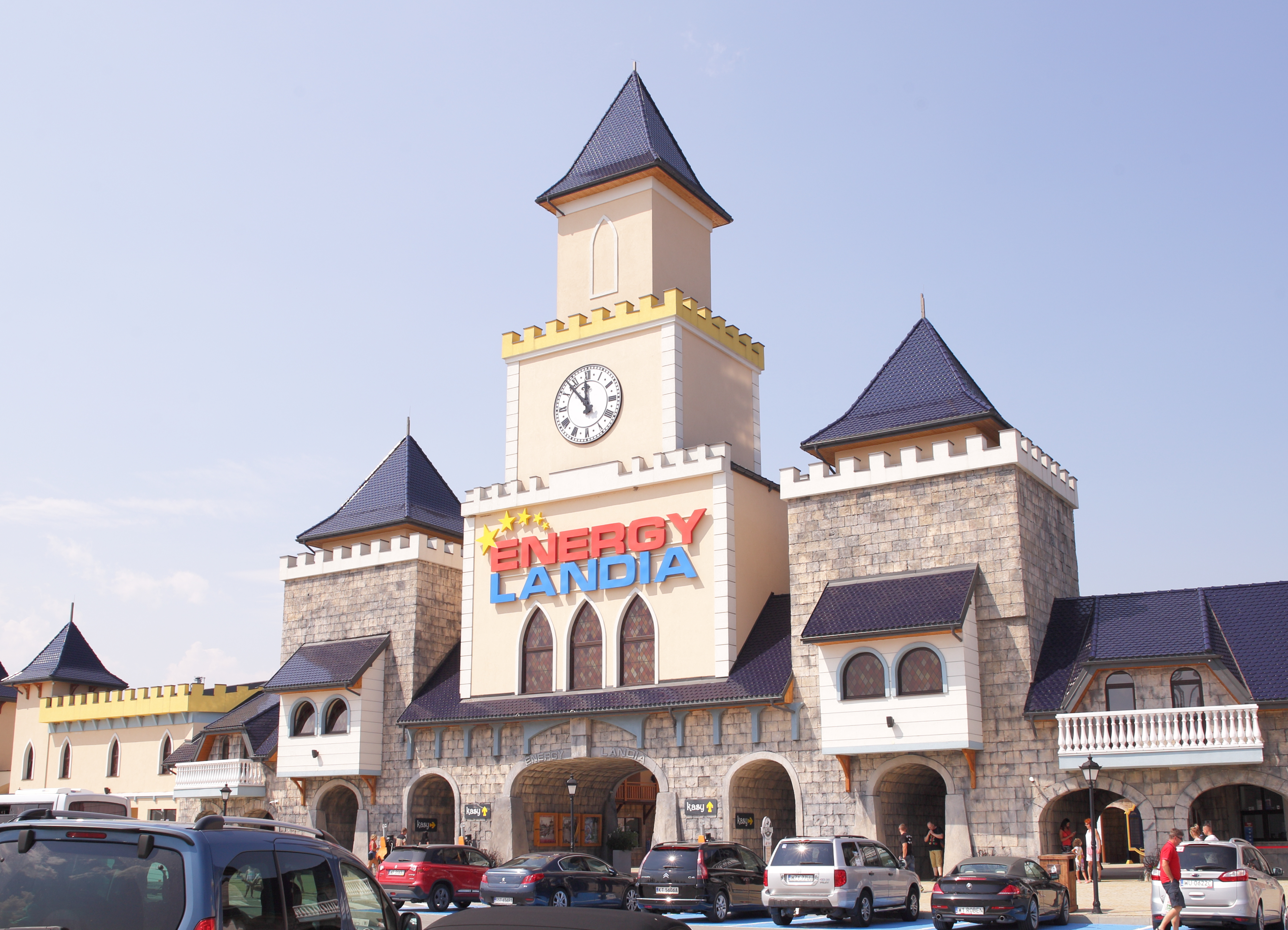
Energylandia celebrated its 5th anniversary in July.

- Legoland California – 20th Anniversary
- Thorpe Park – 40th Anniversary
- Energylandia – 5th Anniversary
- Wonderland Ankara – 15th Anniversary
- Mirabilandia Olinda – 25th Anniversary
- Gulliver's Land – 20th Anniversary
- Happy Valley Chengdu – 10th Anniversary
- Cinecittà World – 5th Anniversary
- PowerPark – 20th Anniversary
- Happy Valley Shanghai – 10th Anniversary
- Universal's Islands of Adventure – 20th Anniversary
- Chimelong Ocean Kingdom – 5th Anniversary
- Adventure City – 25th Anniversary
- Busch Gardens Tampa – 60th Anniversary
- Walibi Rhône-Alpes – 40th Anniversary
- Trans Studio Makassar – 10th Anniversary

=== Closed ===
- Bedrock City Arizona – January 28
- Scandia Amusement Park (Ontario) – February 3
- Sybrandy's Speelpark – August 25
- Boomers! Medford – September 29
- La Feria de Chapultepec

== Additions ==
=== Roller coasters ===
==== New ====
Name	Park	Type	Manufacturer	Opened	Ref(s)
Airbender	Camel Creek Adventure Park	Steel roller coaster	Interpark	March 20	
Batman: The Ride	Six Flags Discovery Kingdom	4D Free Spin	S&S - Sansei Technologies	2019	
Copperhead Strike	Carowinds	Launched roller coaster	Mack Rides	March 23	
Dragonflier	Dollywood	Suspended Family Coaster	Vekoma	May 10	
Draken	Energylandia	Family roller coaster	Preston & Barbieri	July 20	
Frida	Energylandia	Junior roller Coaster	Vekoma	July 20	
Flying Dragon	Oriental Legend	Hyper Space Warp	Vekoma	August 1	
Garden Fantasy	Guangzhou Sunac Land	Inverted Powered Coaster	Beijing Shibaolai Amusement Equipment	June 15	
Maxx Force	Six Flags Great America	Steel Launched roller coaster	S&S - Sansei Technologies	July 4	
Tidal Twister	SeaWorld San Diego	Skywarp Horizon	Skyline Attractions	2019	
Tigris	Busch Gardens Tampa	Steel Launched roller coaster	Premier Rides	April 19	
Hagrid's Magical Creatures Motorbike Adventure	Universal's Islands of Adventure	Motorbike roller coaster	Intamin	June 13	
Yukon Striker	Canada's Wonderland	Steel dive coaster	Bolliger & Mabillard	May 3	
Dueling Dragons	Guangzhou Sunac Land	Dueling Launched roller coaster	Intamin	June 15	
Steel Curtain	Kennywood	Steel roller coaster	S&S - Sansei Technologies	July 13	
Frankie's Mine Train	Frontier City	Steel Family roller coaster	Zamperla	2019	
Dynamite	Freizeitpark Plohn	Steel roller coaster	Mack Rides	2019	
Tidal Wave	Jenkinson's Boardwalk	Spinning roller coaster	SBF Visa Group	2019	
Taiga	Linnanmäki	Steel Launched roller coaster	Intamin	2019	
Kentucky Flyer	Kentucky Kingdom	Wooden roller coaster	The Gravity Group	2019	
Crazy 8's	John's Incredible Pizza Company, Carson	Spinning roller coaster	SBF Visa Group	2019	
Speedy Beetle	Luna Park, Melbourne	Spinning roller coaster	SBF Visa Group	January 1	
Tidal Wave	Clarence Pier	Spinning roller coaster	SBF Visa Group	April 10	
TMNT Shellraiser	Nickelodeon Universe In American Dream Meadowlands	Euro-Fighter roller coaster	Gerstlauer	October 25	
Nickelodeon Slime Streak	Nickelodeon Universe In American Dream Meadowlands	Steel Family roller coaster	Chance Rides	October 25	
The Shredder	Nickelodeon Universe In American Dream Meadowlands	Spinning roller coaster	Gerstlauer	November 2	
Timmy's Half Pipe Havoc	Nickelodeon Universe In American Dream Meadowlands	Half Pipe roller coaster	Intamin	December 7	
Pirate's Coaster	Parc du Bocasse	Junior roller Coaster	Preston & Barbieri	2019	
Fun Pilot	Walibi Belgium	Steel Family roller coaster	Zierer	2019	
Gods Of Egypt Battle For Eternity	Lionsgate Entertainment World	Vr Steel Powered roller coaster	Mack Rides	July 31	
Gold Rusher	Tatzmania Löffingen	Steel roller coaster	Gerstlauer	August 2	
Crazy Taxi Coaster	Transmart Malang	Steel Family roller coaster	Vekoma	February 22	
Falcon	Wuxi Sunac Land	Wing coaster	Bolliger & Mabillard	June 29	
Power Splash	Happy Valley Shenzhen	PowerSplash	Mack Rides	October 2	
Jungle Rat	Shen Jun Ecological Culture Town	Steel roller coaster	unknown	2019	
Gliding Dragon	Shen Jun Ecological Culture Town	Steel Powered roller coaster	unknown	2019	
Four Ring Roller Coaster	Shen Jun Ecological Culture Town	Steel roller coaster	Zhipao	2019	
Fury	Bobbejaanland	Infinity Coaster	Gerstlauer	2019	
Mad Mouse	Clarence Pier	Cyclon Coaster	SBF Visa Group	March 2	
New Voyage	Gyeongnam Mason Robotland	Water coaster	unknown	September 6	
Highway Boat	Sun World Danang Wonders	Suspended roller coaster	ABC Rides	2019	
Bumble Blast	Calaway Park	Spinning roller coaster	Gosetto	2019	
Phoenix	Adventureland	Spinning roller coaster	Maurer Rides	2019	
Himalayan Eagle Music Roller Coaster	Happy Valley Beijing	Hyper Coaster	Bolliger & Mabillard	2019	
Forest Adventure	Gyeongnam Mason Robotland	Steel roller coaster	Zamperla	September 6	
Pierre de Tonnerre	Parc du Petit Prince	Junior Spinning Coaster	Reverchon	2019	
Erdbeer Raupenbahn	Karls Erlebnis-Dorf Rövershagen	Junior roller Coaster	SBF Visa Group	April 13	
Kaffeekannen-Express	Karls Erlebnis-Dorf Rövershagen	Powered roller coaster	SBF Visa Group	December 6	
Misket Coaster	Wonderland Eurasia	Indoor roller coaster	unknown	March 20	
Lav Macerasi	Wonderland Eurasia	Steel roller coaster	I.E. Park	March 20	
Volare Hiz Kizagi	Wonderland Eurasia	Flying roller coaster	Zamperla	March 20	
Thunderbolt	Gyeongnam Mason Robotland	Steel roller coaster	Zamperla	September 6	
Seydi Reis	Wonderland Eurasia	Steel Junior roller coaster	unknown	March 20	
Wilkołak	Majaland Kownaty	Wooden roller coaster	Great Coasters International	2019	
Devin Kileri	Wonderland Eurasia	Steel roller coaster	Zierer	March 20	
Sand Storm	Joyland Amusement Park	Steel roller coaster	Cavazza Diego	2019	
Ejderha Uçuşu	Wonderland Eurasia	Steel Family roller coaster	Zierer	March 20	
Desmo Race	Mirabilandia	Spike Dragster	Maurer Rides	2019	
Télégraphe	Méga Parc	Cloud Coaster	Extreme Engineering	January 18	
Mystic	Walibi Rhône-Alpes	Infinity Coaster	Gerstlauer	May 30	
Nid des Marsupilamis	Parc Spirou	Roller Ball	Ride Engineers Switzerland	2019	
Boule & Bille déboulent	Parc Spirou	Spinning Family roller coaster	Preston & Barbieri	2019	
Lightspeed	Wonderland Eurasia	Steel roller coaster	Intamin	March 20	
Flight School	Tayto Park	Steel Family roller coaster	Zierer	2019	
Relámpago	Mundo Petapa	Steel roller coaster	Zamperla	2019	
Runaway Tram	Morey's Piers	Steel Family roller coaster	Zierer	August 9	
Altin Madeni Coaster	Wonderland Eurasia	Family roller coaster	SBF Visa Group	March 20	
Köpekbalığı Girdabı	Wonderland Eurasia	Junior roller Coaster	unknown	March 20	
Factory Coaster	Wuxi Sunac Land	Indoor roller coaster	Zamperla	June 29	
Steam Racers	Wuxi Sunac Land	Launched roller coaster	Mack Rides	June 29	
Red Mountain	Fiabilandia	Family roller coaster	Preston & Barbieri	2019	
Crazy Taxi Coaster	Trans Studio Mini Tasikmalaya	Junior roller Coaster	Vekoma	2019	
Dragon Coaster	Clementon Park	Steel Junior roller coaster	Wisdom Rides	2019	
Panic Coaster – Back Daaan	Tokyo Dome City Attractions	Family Launched roller coaster	Gerstlauer	March 23	
Zadra	Energylandia	Steel roller coaster	Rocky Mountain Construction	August 22	
Haunted Coaster	Dunia Fantasi	Indoor roller coaster	Intamin	December 21	
Celestial Gauntlet	Oriental Heritage Changsha	Space Warp	Vekoma	2019	
Big Top	Oriental Heritage Changsha	Suspended roller coaster	Vekoma	2019	
Puppy Coaster	Oriental Heritage Changsha	Junior roller Coaster	Beijing Shibaolai Amusement Equipment	2019	
Kamelen	Tivoli Gardens	Steel Family roller coaster	Zierer	April 4	
Mælkevejen	Tivoli Gardens	Steel Powered roller coaster	Mack Rides	November 28	
Mola Mola	Ocean Dream Samudra	Spinning Coaster	SBF Visa Group	December 4	

==== Relocated ====
Name	Park	Type	Manufacturer	Opened	Formerly	Ref(s)
Alien Taxi	Trans Studio Cibubur	Spinning roller coaster	Maurer Rides	July 12	Xtreme at Blue Bayou and Dixie Landin'	
Barracuda	Jolly Roger Amusement Park	Steel roller coaster	Zierer	2019	Flitzer at Jenkinson's Boardwalk	
Bat Glider	Trans Studio Bali	Suspended roller coaster	Caripro	December 12	Vleermuis at Plopsaland	
Bat Glider	Trans Studio Cibubur	Suspended roller coaster	Caripro	July 12	Batflyer at Hamanako Pal Pal	
Boomerang Challenge Coaster	Trans Studio Bali	Boomerang roller coaster	Vekoma	December 12	Boomerang at Pleasure Island Family Theme Park	
Dragon's Flight	Fantasy Island	Family roller coaster	Wisdom Rides	2019	Dragon Wagon at Indiana Beach	
Dark Coaster	Atlantis Land	Junior roller Coaster	Vekoma	2019	Space Adventure at Kumdori Land	
Eurostar	Anapa Park Jungle	Inverted roller coaster	Intamin	August 8	Eurostar at Gorky Park	
Rugido del Jaguar	Xejuyup	Junior roller Coaster	Vekoma	2019	Voltron at Planeta Primma	
Hurricane	Fun Spot America Kissimmee	Steel roller coaster	E&F Miler Industries	December 24	Viking Voyage at Wild Adventures	
Intrépide	Pays des Merveilles	Junior roller Coaster	E&F Miler Industries	2019	Gold Rush Express at Fort Jefferson Fun Park	
Orient Express	Grady's Family Fun Park	Family roller coaster	Wisdom Rides	2019	Screaming Dragon at Thunder Road Family Fun Park	
Wild Mouse	Arnolds Park Amusement Park	Wild Mouse roller coaster	Allan Herschell Company	2019	Mad Mouse at Joyland Amusement Park	

==== Refurbished ====
Name	Park	Type	Manufacturer	Opened	Formerly	Ref(s)
Colossos: Kampf der Giganten	Heide Park	Wooden roller coaster	Intamin	2019	Colossos	
Egg-Spress	Pleasurewood Hills	Steel Family roller coaster	Zierer	2019	Rattlesnake	
Electro	Méga Parc	Steel Family roller coaster	Mack Rides	January 17	Capitale Express	
Firebird	Six Flags America	Floorless Coaster	Bolliger & Mabillard	2019	Apocalypse	
Fort d'Odin	Parc du Bocasse	Mine train roller coaster	Soquet	2019	Train de Mine	
Hakugei	Nagashima Spa Land	Steel roller coaster	Rocky Mountain Construction	March 2019	White Cyclone	
Piraten Spinner	Freizeit-Land Geiselwind	Spinning roller coaster	Zierer	2019	Drehgondelbahn	
Sequoia Magic Loop	Gardaland	Screaming Squirrel	S&S - Sansei Technologies	2019	Sequoia Adventure	
Super Grover's Box Car Derby	SeaWorld Orlando; SeaWorld San Antonio	Steel Family roller coaster	Zierer	2019	Shamu Express	
Superman Kripton Coaster	Six Flags Mexico	Junior roller Coaster	Vekoma	2019	Roller	
The Flash: Vertical Velocity	Six Flags Discovery Kingdom	Impulse roller coaster	Intamin	2019	Vertical Velocity	
Untamed	Walibi Holland	Steel roller coaster	Rocky Mountain Construction	July 1	Robin Hood	
Ziggy's Blast Quest	The Milky Way Adventure Park	Interactive Suspended roller coaster	Caripro	April 6	Clone Zone	

=== Other attractions ===
==== New ====
Name	Park	Type	Opened	Ref(s)
4d Theater	Trans Studio Cibubur	4D film	July 12	
Amphitheatre	Trans Studio Bali	Amphitheatre	December 12	
Axis	Adventure Island	Frisbee ride	May 4, 2019	
Baling Baling	Dunia Fantasi	Helicopter Propeller	June 5	
Beach Club	Trans Studio Cibubur	Restaurant	July 12	
Bugs Bunny BoomTown; DC Super Friends	Six Flags Mexico	Themed areas	2019	
Can Can Revue	Trans Studio Bali	Amphitheatre	December 12	
Carousal	Trans Studio Cibubur; Panama Park 825	Carousel	September 7 September 30	
Chaos	Waldameer & Water World	Zamperla Discovery Revolution (Frisbee ride)	May 4	
Chaos; El Diablo	La Ronde; Six Flags Over Texas	Giant Loop/Giga Loop	2019	
Cyborg: Hyper Drive	Six Flags New England	Multi-axis thrill ride	2019	
Dragon's Revenge	Funfields	Swing ride	2019	
Dunia Kartun	Dunia Fantasi	Themed area	June 5	
Escape Plan Prison Break	Lionsgate Entertainment World	Climbing wall	July 31	
Extreme Insect Playground	Trans Studio Cibubur	Playground	July 12	
Fear The Walking Dead Survival	Trans Studio Bali	Interactive Shooting	December 12	
Ferris Wheel	Panama Park 825	Ferris Wheel	September 30	
Flying Over Indonesia: Islands Of Imagination	Trans Studio Bali	Flying Theater	December 12	
The Forbidden Temple Rapid Adventures	Trans Studio Bali	River rapids ride	December 12	
Formula Kart	Trans Studio Cibubur; Trans Studio Bali	Go-kart	July 12; December 12	
Fully 6	WhiteWater World (Dreamworld)	Body slides	December 21	
Gayatri	Trans Studio Bali	Amphitheatre	December 12	
Godzilla vs. Evangelion: The Real 4-D	Universal Studios Japan	4D film	Opening May 31; Closing August 25	
Hunger Games Flight Rebel Escape	Lionsgate Entertainment World	Motion Simulator	July 31	
I-Fly Indoor Skydiving	Trans Studio Cibubur; Trans Studio Bali	Vertical wind tunnel Attraction	2019	
Illusion House	Trans Studio Bali	Climbing Wall and photographer	December 12	
Jurassic Island	Trans Studio Cibubur	Immersive Superflume	August 24	
Karavel	Dunia Fantasi	Caterpillar	June 5	
Kids Playground	Trans Studio Bali; Trans Studio Cibubur	Playground	December 12	
King Cobra	Six Flags Hurricane Harbor, Oaxtepec	Water slide	2019	
King Kong Tower	Trans Studio Cibubur	Animatronic; Store	July 12	
Kolibri	Dunia Fantasi	Flying Ride	June 5	
The Lego Movie: Masters of Flight	Legoland Florida	Flying theatre	February 27	
Lightning McQueen's Racing Academy	Disney's Hollywood Studios	Live theatre show	March 31	
La Foresta Incantata	Gardaland	Walk Through	March 30	
Mad Madness Road Rage Wasteland Escape	Trans Studio Bali	Stunt Show Dark ride Escape Room	December 12	
Magic Bike	Trans Studio Cibubur	Flying Ride	September 7	
Marvel-themed area	Hong Kong Disneyland	Themed area	March 31	
Mickey's Mix Magic	Disneyland	Nighttime show	January 19	
Mickey's PhilharMagic	Disney California Adventure	4D film	April 26	
Millennium Falcon: Smugglers Run	Disneyland; Disney's Hollywood Studios	Interactive simulator ride	May 31; August 29	
New Fantastique	Dunia Fantasi	Amphitheatre	December 2019	
New Ontang Anting	Dunia Fantasi	Swing ride	June 5	
Ninja Warrior Course	Trans Studio Bali	Parkour	December 12	
Pacific Rim Shatterdome Strike	Trans Studio Cibubur	3D Dark ride	July 12	
Pandemonium; The Joker: Carnival of Chaos; Wonder Woman: Lasso of Truth	Six Flags Over Georgia; Six Flags Fiesta Texas; Six Flags Great Adventure	Zamperla Giant/Giga Discovery Frisbee (Pendulum rides)	Spring 2019	
Paralayang	Dunia Fantasi	Paralayang	June 5	
Pegasus Sky Bounce	Funfields	Children's drop tower	2019	
Playground	Panama Park 825	Playground	September 30	
Prank House	Trans Studio Bali	Fun House And Prank	December 12	
Puppet Master	Trans Studio Bali	Small Ferris Wheel	December 12	
Rocket Blasters	Great Escape	Splash Battle	2019	
Science Center	Trans Studio Cibubur	Science Center	July 12	
Six Flags SkyScreamer	Six Flags Darien Lake	Tower Swinger	2019	
Sky Voyager	Dreamworld	Flying Theater	September 1	
Snow Park	Panama Park 825	Snow Park	September 30	
Snow Playground	Trans Studio Cibubur	Snow Playground	October 13	
Soaring: Fantastic Flight	Tokyo DisneySea	Simulator ride	2019	
Spectacular Multimedia Show	Trans Studio Cibubur	Amphitheatre	July 12	
Star Wars: Galaxy's Edge	Disneyland; Disney's Hollywood Studios	Themed area	May 31; August 29	
Star Wars: Rise of the Resistance	Disney's Hollywood Studios	Trackless dark ride	December 5	
Stunt Show Swat Raid	Trans Studio Cibubur	Stunt Show	July 12	
Supergirl: Sky Flyer	Six Flags St. Louis	SkyFlyer	2019	
Temple Rides Stunt Show	Trans Studio Bali	Stunt Show	December 12	
Tilting Village	Trans Studio Cibubur	Village	July 12	
Timber Town	Frontier City	Themed area	2019	
Titanic	Trans Studio Bali	Cruise Ship	December 12	
Trans Central Station	Trans Studio Cibubur	Themed area	July 12	
Turbo Drop	Dunia Fantasi	Drop Tower	June 5	
The Twilight Saga Midnight Ride	Lionsgate Entertainment World	Vr Dirt-Bike Adventure	July 31	
Wave Racer	Trans Studio Cibubur	Dual Water Carousel	July 12	
Werewolf World	Trans Studio Bali	Haunted House	December 12	
Wildwood Grove	Dollywood	Themed area	2019	
Zero Gravity	Trans Studio Cibubur	Gravitron	July 12	
Zigzag	Dunia Fantasi	Bumper Cars	June 5	
Zombie Wars	Trans Studio Cibubur	Interactive Shooting	July 12	

==== Refurbished ====
Name	Park	Type	Opened	Formerly	Ref(s)
Ant-Man and The Wasp: Nano Battle!	Hong Kong Disneyland	Interactive Dark Ride	March 31	Buzz Lightyear Astro Blasters	
Battle of Bricksburg	Legoland Florida	Splash Battle	February 27	Quest for Chi	
Calico River Rapids	Knott's Berry Farm	River rapids ride	Summer 2019	Bigfoot Rapids	
CNN Indonesia	Trans Studio Bandung	News	June 2019	Cowette Dinner	
Inside Out Emotional Whirlwind	Disney California Adventure	Hanging balloon ride	June 27	Flik's Flyers	
Jessie's Critter Carousel	Disney California Adventure	Carousel	April 5, 2019	King Triton's Carousel of the Sea	
Jurassic World	Universal Studios Hollywood	Shoot the Chute	July 12	Jurassic Park: The Ride	
The Lego Movie World	Legoland Florida	Themed area	February 27	The World of Chima	
Mountain Gliders	Carowinds	Flying Skooters	March 23	Woodstock Gliders	
Phantom Manor	Disneyland Paris	Dark ride	May 3	Phantom Manor	
Pirates of the Deep Sea	Six Flags Fiesta Texas	Interactive Dark Ride	January 12	Scooby-Doo! Ghostblasters: The Mystery of the Haunted Mansion	
Reese's Cupfusion	Hersheypark	Interactive Dark Ride	May 25	Reese's Xtreme Cup Challenge	
Sesame Street Land	SeaWorld Orlando	Themed area	2019	Shamu's Happy Harbor	
Wildlife Express Train	Disney's Animal Kingdom	Train	July 11	Wildlife Express Train	

== Closed attractions and roller coasters ==
Name	Park	Type	Closed	Refs
Arkham Asylum – Shock Therapy	Warner Bros. Movie World	Inverted roller coaster	December 2019	
Aquaman Splashdown	Six Flags Over Texas	Shoot-the-Chutes	2019	
Aquaman - The Exhibition	Warner Bros. Movie World	Walk-through Attraction	July 17	
Armageddon – Les Effets Speciaux	Walt Disney Studios Park	Special effects simulation	April 1	
Art of Disney Animation	Walt Disney Studios Park	Walk-through Attraction	January 7	
Be-Bop Blvd	Michigan's Adventure	Antique Cars	August 11	
Bob Track	Efteling	Bobsled roller coaster	September 1	
Burnout	Funfields	Trabant	September	
Celebrate! Tokyo Disneyland	Tokyo Disneyland	Multimedia, water and pyrotechnics show	April 26	
Clone Zone	The Milky Way Adventure Park	Suspended roller coaster	February 24	
Dinosaurs Alive!	Worlds of Fun; Valleyfair; Carowinds	Walk-through Attraction	October 27; October 27; August 18	
Dodgem Cars	Warner Bros. Movie World	Dodgem cars	2019	
Dragon	Adventureland	Steel roller coaster	September 29	
Giggles and Hoot Hop and Hoot	Dreamworld	Jumping Star	Mid 2019	
IllumiNations: Reflections of Earth	Epcot	Fireworks, laser, water, fire, and light show	2019	
Looping Starship	Valleyfair	Intamin Looping Starship	2019	
Noah's Ark	Six Flags New England	Fun house	2019	
One Man's Dream II: The Magic Lives On	Tokyo Disneyland	Live stage show	December 13	
Primeval Whirl	Disney's Animal Kingdom	Spinning Wild Mouse roller coaster	June 17	
Red Car Trolley	Disney California Adventure	Trolley	April 1	
Remember... Dreams Come True	Disneyland	Multimedia and fireworks spectacular show	January 17	
Rock 'n' Roller Coaster Starring Aerosmith	Walt Disney Studios Park	Launched roller coaster	September 2	
Star Wars: A Galactic Spectacular	Disney's Hollywood Studios	Fireworks spectacular and multimedia show	March 31	
Super Manège	La Ronde	Steel roller coaster	August 25	
V8 Supercars RedLine	Dreamworld	Racing simulator	October	
Vortex	Kings Island	Steel roller coaster	October 27	
Tower of Terror II	Dreamworld	Shuttle roller coaster	November 3	
Trolls Village	Dreamworld	Walk-through Attraction	2019	
Wild Kitty	Frontier City	Steel Junior roller coaster	June 1	
Wipeout	Dreamworld	Waikiki Wave Super Flip	March 8	
Vlinderbaan	Sybrandy's Speelpark	Sunkid Heege Butterfly	August 25	
