= Trans Studio =

Trans Studio may refer to:

- Trans Studio Bandung, a shopping mall, amusement park, and hotel in Bandung, Indonesia
- Trans Studio Cibubur, a shopping mall, amusement park, hotel and apartment towers in Depok, West Java, Indonesia
- Trans Studio Makassar, an amusement park and development in Makassar, South Sulawesi, Indonesia
- Trans Studio Samarinda, a cancelled amusement park and hotel project in Samarinda, Borneo, Indonesia
