= Mine train =

Mine train or Mine Train may refer to:

- Mine railway
- Mine train roller coaster
  - Runaway Mine Train, formerly Mine Train, at Six Flags Over Texas
  - Frankie's Mine Train, formerly Mine Train, at Great Escape
- Mine Train Through Nature's Wonderland, former narrow gauge railroad attraction at Disneyland
