= Metro (department store) =

Indonesian department store chain

Metro Private Limited
- Native name: 美羅
- Type: Subsidiary
- Industry: Retail
- Founded: 1953 in Surabaya, Indonesia; 1991, reopened in Jakarta, Indonesia
- Founder: Ong Tjoe Kim
- Headquarters: Jakarta, Indonesia
- Area served: Singapore; Indonesia
- Key people: Winston Choo Wee Leong (Chairman); Jopie Ong Hie Koan (Managing Director); Chairul Tanjung (Chairman of Metro Indonesia)
- Owner: Metro Holdings Limited
- Website: Metro Singapore; Metro Indonesia

Metro is an Indonesia based chain department store selling cosmetics, apparel and fashion accessories. Founded by Ong Tjoe Kim in 1953, Metro currently has 12 outlets located across Indonesia and 2 in Singapore.

== History ==
Metro's founder Ong Tjoe Kim originally from Fujian, China, migrated to Indonesia when he was a teenager. He joined the Toko Dezon department store and worked his way up to a managerial position. In 1952, Ong decided to venture out on his own and eventually opened the first Metro store in 1953 in Surabaya, Indonesia. Ong chose the name, Metro, after his love for movies made by film studio, Metro-Goldwyn-Mayer. Metro opened its first Singapore-based outlet in 1957, at the site that is now the Singapore Treasury Building, after Ong migrated from Indonesia to Singapore, pitching its business at the wealthy housewives of Indonesia and Singapore.

A department store was opened in Hong Kong in 1960. The first Metro branch under the name of Metrotex opened in Liat Towers on Orchard Road in 1965, being one of the first Singapore department stores to carry imported designer goods. The branch was renamed Metro Orchard when it moved into the Holiday Inn Shopping Complex on Scotts Road in 1973. Metro continued to expand and set up more branches including Metro Supreme in 1971, Metro Golden Mile in 1974, Metro Grand in Lucky Plaza in 1978 and Metro Scotts and Metro Far East in 1983.

In 1987, Metro became Paragon's anchor tenant and would occupy the third and fourth storeys of the building. It opened in December in the same year.

Other than carrying in overseas label, Metro delved into developing Singapore's private label in fashion merchandise.

In January 2012, Metro Department Store was brought back to Surabaya, Indonesia, where it was opened in Ciputra World Surabaya, after 60 years of founding.

In July 2026, Metro announced that it will gradually shut down all the department store outlets - starting from Causeway Point and finishing at Paragon from October 2026 when their existing leases expire. The two outlets are Metro's last remaining large-format department stores in Singapore. The company did not provide closure dates and said that the timeline and scope of the transition remained under review. Metro is considering smaller-format stores, multi-specialty outlets, curated retail experiences and pop-up stores as it moves away from the traditional large-format department-store model.

== Metro Holdings ==
Metro Pte Ltd was publicly listed on the Singapore Stock Exchange in 1973 as Metro Holdings Limited.

As the company started to expand, Metro Holdings began to look towards diversifying its interests and expanding beyond retailing. In 1977, the company acquired Orchard Square Development Corporation Private Limited, the joint developer for Ngee Ann City and set up Metrobilt Pte Ltd, expanding its business into construction and building. In the same year, the company opened Futaba Bakery in the supermarket of Metro Golden Mile in a joint venture with Futaba Bakery Co Ltd, Japan. The company continued to diversify its business by buying into Datalogue (S) Pte Ltd, a company dealing in computer software. Metro Holdings also ventured into credit leasing business when it bought into Trans-Pacific Credit Pte Ltd in 1982. Metro Holdings also co-founded luxury brand retailer chain, The Hour Glass in 1979. The company also started a subsidiary company, Transmarco in 1978 as a distribution marketing company for luxury brands.

The Metro group's key businesses today focuses primarily on property investments in China, Japan and UK and retail properties in China and Indonesia.

=== Metro Private Limited ===
Metro Private Limited as the retail branch of Metro Holdings Limited also went into specialty retailing and ventured into many retail formats. Metro Pte Ltd initiated a joint venture with Toys ‘R’ Us Inc in 1984 and opened its first store Toys ‘R’ Us Metro outlet in Marine Parade. The venture was terminated in 1993 when the Metro Holdings sold its shares back to the parent company of Toys ‘R’ Us Inc.

In 1993, Metro (Pte) Ltd partnered with Kmart USA to open 3 Kmart Metro stores in Marina Square, United Square and Century Square. The venture was dissolved in 1996. Metro is also the local franchisee for British high-street fashion and accessories chains Monsoon and Accessorize.

In the 1990s, Metro re-entered the suburbs following Singapore's public housing trend and development to open Metro Tampines in 1996, Metro Woodlands in 1998, Metro Sengkang in 2002 and Metro City Square in 2009. With the closure of the Metro outlet at Tampines in 2007. Metro Paragon is its flagship store at Paragon mall and Metro Centrepoint, opened in November 2014 at The Centrepoint mall. Metro closed down one at Sengkang in 2015 and City Square in 2015. Metro shuttered its store at Centrepoint on 15 September 2019. Therefore, leaving Metro with two stores left, one at Paragon Orchard and the second one at Causeway Point a suburban area.

=== Logo design ===
The logo of Metro was created in 1957, with a simple typography that included the Chinese calligraphy of 美羅, which has a similar pronunciation as Metro. The inspiration for the first logo came from the ancient Chinese seal. The logo underwent a change in 1982, when it was redesigned by Landor Associates Ltd. The new logo, reflects the ‘East meets West’ influence incorporates the calligraphic M, customised hand-lettered Metro wordmark in English and brushed-lettered calligraphy Metro wordmark in Chinese.

== Milestones of Metro ==
1957	Metro starts as a textile store on 72 High Street.
1965	The first Metro department store opens at Orchard Road in Liat Towers and is known as Metrotex.
1972	Metro Toyland opens at George Lee Building.
1973	Metrotex relocates to Holiday Inn Shopping Complex on Scotts Road and is renamed as Metro Orchard. Metro Holdings is formed and the company is listed on the Main Board of the Stock Exchange of Singapore.
1974	Opens the Les Must de Cartier boutique in Far East Shopping Centre. Metro becomes an affiliated member with one of the largest retail sourcing organisation, Associated Merchandising Corporation in the USA. Opens Metro Golden Mile, a 110,000 square feet store with a supermarket.
1976	First joint venture department store, Metrojaya opens in Malaysia, Kuala Lumpur(KL). The stakes were later sold. Formation of Metrobilt Pte Ltd to participate in the building and construction industry.
1978	Introduction of Metro Grand at Lucky Plaza, Singapore's first luxurious, premium, high-end department store that adopted a brand boutiques concept within a store. Transmarco Pte Ltd was set up to take over and expand the activities of the wholesale division of the Group.
1979	Metro enters the watch market through the establishment of The Hour Glass.
1981	Closure of Metro Bukit Timah.
1982	The premises occupied by Metro Grand at Lucky Plaza were purchased at 28 million. The new Metro logo designed by Landor Associates is launched.
1984	Metro Private Limited expands into the toy business in a joint venture with Toys R Us Inc of USA.
1985	The first Toys ‘R’ Us outlet opens in Marine Parade and “Metro is Singapore” brand identity is launched.
1986	Opening of Metro's first factory outlet at Metro Golden Mile.
1988	Metrobilt enters a joint venture to develop office property in Guangzhou, China.
1990	Metrojaya Berhad is listed on Kuala Lumpur Stock Exchange.
1991	Metro sets up its first department store in Jakarta under a special and technical assistance arrangement.
1993	Metro enters into a joint venture with Kmart USA. Disposal of interest in the Singapore operations of Toys R Us, Metrojaya Bhd. Develops Metro Tower and Metro City in Shanghai.
1994	Opening of Kmart stores in Singapore. Acquisition of 24.5% stake in the Gurney Park retail/hotel/residential development in Penang, Malaysia. Disposal of entire stake in watch and fashion retailer Transmarco Ltd.
1996	Metro department store business re-enters the suburban market in Singapore and opens its first suburban store Metro Tampines in Century Square. Kmart operation is terminated. Metro introduces Internet shopping for its customers.
1997	Metro Tower, a 26-storey office tower in Shanghai, is completed. Metro acquires Sun Vista and Sun Viva passenger vessels. Metro opens The Oasis resort in Cairns, Australia.
1998	Metro City, a 9-storey entertainment complex in Shanghai, opens.
2000	Sun Viva I and Sun Viva II were disposed of and Metro exited the cruise business. Metro acquired a 50% interest in the Metro Indonesian Department Store business which operates two stores in Jakarta. The Oasis Resort, Cairns, won the “Best Deluxe Accommodation” in the Tropical North Queensland Tourism Awards. Work in retail mall in Gurney Park, Penang commences.
2001	Gurney Plaza mall in Penang, Malaysia is completed and launched. Additional 22,000 sq ft of retail space is added to Metro Woodlands store. Metro Paragon is retrofitted and refocuses on fashion lifestyle.
2002	First specialty shop Accessorize opens at Bugis Junction.
2003	Launch of Metro co-branded and in-house credit cards. First Metro warehouse sale is introduced.
2004	Closure of Metro Marina.
2005	Metro is the first retailer in Singapore to launch the electronic gift card. The initiative is a partnership between Metro and Network for Electronic Transfer Singapore Pte Ltd (NETS).
2007	Metro City in Beijing is completed. Metro celebrates its 50th anniversary.
2009	Opening of Monsoon Accessorize, the first standalone store, in Ion.
2010	The first outlet of M2, a multi-label shoe speciality shop opens in Takashimaya shopping mall.
2014	Opening of Metro Centrepoint at The Centrepoint, the second store on Orchard Road, and Metro's biggest department store with 6 levels.
2015	Metro closes its outlet at Compass Point after 12 years of operations and closes its outlet at City Square Mall after 6 years of operations.
2019	Metro closes its outlet at The Centrepoint after 5 years of operations.
2026	2026 Metro announces that its two remaining large-format department stores in Singapore will close when their leases expire.

== Metro Indonesia ==
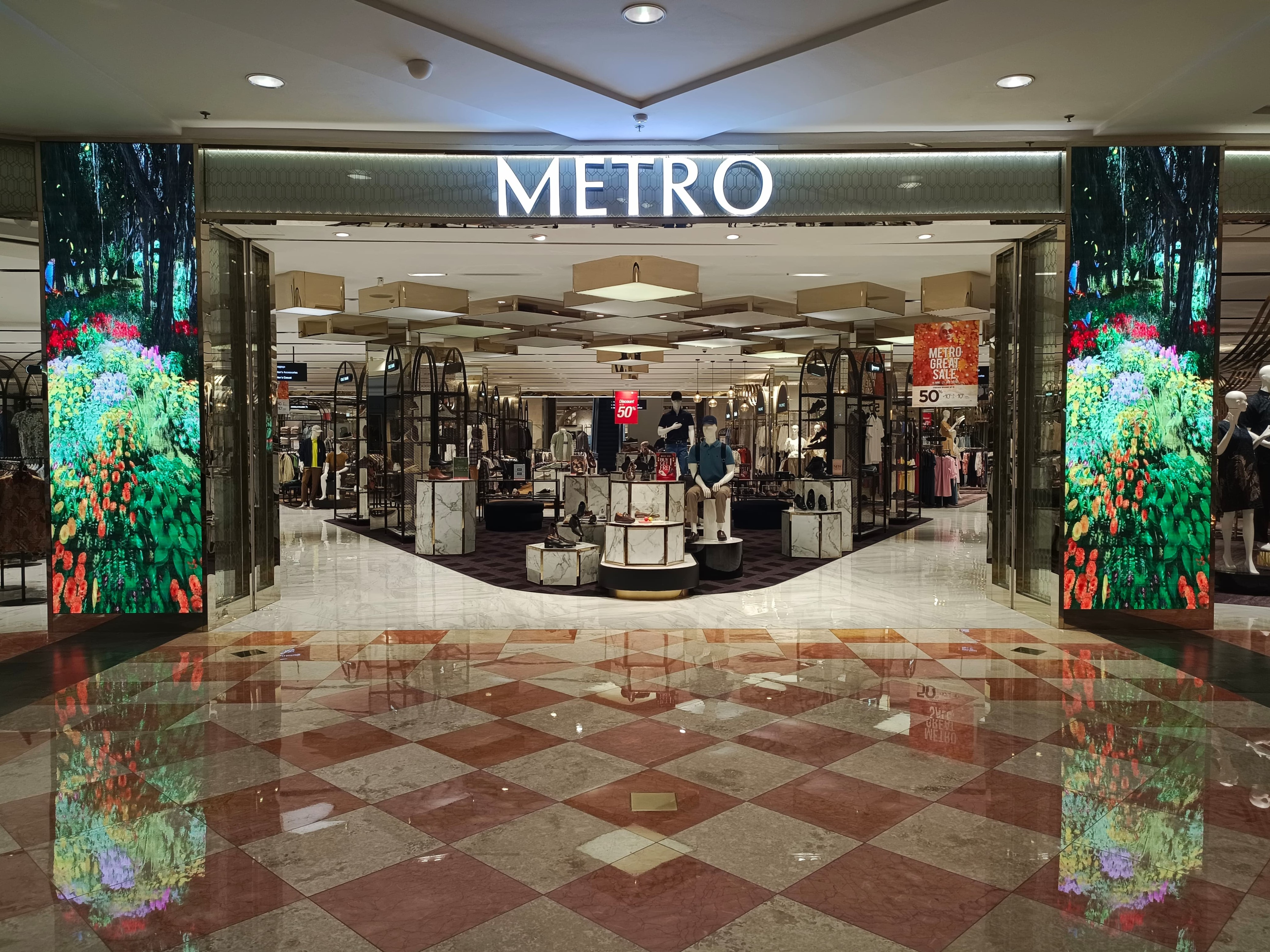
Metro Department Store in Plaza Senayan.

Greater Jakarta	Pondok Indah Mall, Plaza Senayan, Gandaria City, Puri Indah Mall, Trans Studio Mall Cibubur, Margo City, Trans Park Mall Bintaro
Karawang	Resinda Park Mall
Bandung	Trans Studio Mall
Solo	The Park Mall
Surabaya	Ciputra World, Trans Icon
Makassar	Trans Studio Mall
Manado	Manado Town Square 3
Medan	Centre Point

The department stores with more than 1,000,000 square feet (93,000 m^{2}) of retail space combined offers merchandise from international labels to famous local brands. It opened its first branch at Pondok Indah Mall in 1991 in partnership with Rajawali Corpora, followed by Plaza Senayan in 1996. Metro expands in 2001-2002 as they opened two new branches at Bandung Supermal (now Trans Studio Mall) & Mal Taman Anggrek respectively. From 2010 to 2012, Metro opened 4 new branches respectively: Makassar's Trans Studio Mall in 2010, Surabaya's Ciputra World in 2011, Jakarta's Gandaria City in 2012, and Solo's The Park Mall in 2013. In 2017, Metro finally expands after 4 years hiatus, opening a new branch in Puri Indah Mall and Grand Kawanua Manado. In 2019, Metro opened its sixth Jakarta store in Trans Studio Mall Cibubur.

Metro Pacific Place, opened in 2008, is closed in 2017. Used to be called as M Pacific Place in 2008 before converted to Metro in 2009, this location is relocated to the Puri Indah Mall branch in 2017, based on inside sources. Meanwhile, in 2018, Metro downsized its Plaza Senayan store from four floors to two floors, followed by its branch at Mal Taman Anggrek in July 2019, downsized from three floors to two floors. At the same year, Grand Kawanua Citywalk closed for reconception, forcing Metro to close. Metro then relocated to Manado Town Square 3 on 3 December 2021, and opened at Margo City on 10 December 2021. Both stores are replacing the recently liquidated Parkson's middle brand Centro, who were declared bankrupt by court in May 2021.

Metro Department Store has continued to expand its presence across Indonesia with the opening of new stores in key locations. In 2021, Metro opened a new store at Resinda Park Mall in Karawang, enhancing the shopping experience for the local community with a wide range of products and services. Following this, in 2022, Metro further expanded by opening a store in Trans Icon Surabaya. This strategic move brought the brand closer to the residents of Surabaya, offering them the latest in fashion, beauty, and lifestyle products. Continuing its growth trajectory, Metro also opened another store in Trans Park Mall Bintaro in the same year. This addition solidified Metro's commitment to providing high-quality shopping experiences across various regions in Indonesia.

During the COVID-19 pandemic, Metro adapted to the changing retail landscape by developing its online shopping platform via WhatsApp, known as METRO Easy Shop. This service was aimed at customers who wished to shop at Metro while minimizing physical contact and maintaining social distancing. METRO Easy Shop has continued to operate post-pandemic, providing a convenient and shopping alternative for customers.

As of 2021, all Metro stores in Indonesia are two-stories high.

CT Corp used to own the franchise alongside Metro Singapore, with the latter being the largest shareholder. In December 2019, Metro Holdings divested Metro Indonesia for S$ 25 million, and eventual owner CT Corp entered a new licensing agreement with Metro Holdings on the same day.
