= Lake Lansing Park North =

Park in Haslett, Ingham County, United States of America

- Location within Michigan
- Location: Ingham County, Michigan, USA
- Nearest city: Haslett, Michigan
- Coordinates: 42°46′07″N 84°23′32″W
- Area: 410 acres (0.64 mi^{2})
- Established: 1986
- Governing body: Ingham County
- Website: Ingham County Parks

Lake Lansing Park North is a public park in Haslett, Michigan covering over 530 acres (0.83 mi^{2}). The park covers a variety of ecosystems, including mature oak and maple woodlands, marshlands, pine plantations and transitional field areas. The park entrance is located at 6260 East Lake Drive across from the Lake Lansing boat launch. There are several trails for hiking in the spring, summer and fall months, and cross country skiing in the winter. There is a per vehicle entrance fee year-round of $3 for Ingham County residents and $5 for non-residents seven days a week. Annual passes are available for $35 for Ingham County residents and $45 for non-Ingham County residents.

Park North was completed in 1986 as part of a rejuvenation project on the Lake Lansing area, starting when Lake Lansing Park South, a sister park across the lake consisting mainly of a beach and picnic grounds, was purchased by Ingham County in 1974. According to the Ingham County Parks Department, roughly 450,000 people visit the Lake Lansing parks a year, with over 90% coming from the Lansing metropolitan area.

== Facilities ==
In addition to the trails, Park North has picnic grounds, a softball diamond, horseshoe pits, volleyball and basketball courts, a cross country ski rental shop open during the winter, two playgrounds, and a disc golf course called Tadpole Beach. This course offers 18 holes perfect for beginner level disc golfers. There are also three shelters constructed around the park that can be reserved for events. Depending on the shelter, they can hold between 60 and 240 people.

There are three full hiking and skiing trails and two cutoff trails that cover approximately 5.3 miles (8.5 km) total according to the Ingham County Parks office. They are mostly wooded with a few boardwalks across marshy areas. Dogs must be on leash. On top of the current 410 acres (0.64 mi^{2}), a Michigan Department of Natural Resources grant is expected to acquire an additional 120 acres (0.19 mi^{2}) for Park North.

== See also ==
- List of lakes in Michigan
- Lake Lansing Park South
