= Antique Carousel =

United States historic place

- William H. Dentzel 1921 Carousel
- U.S. National Register of Historic Places
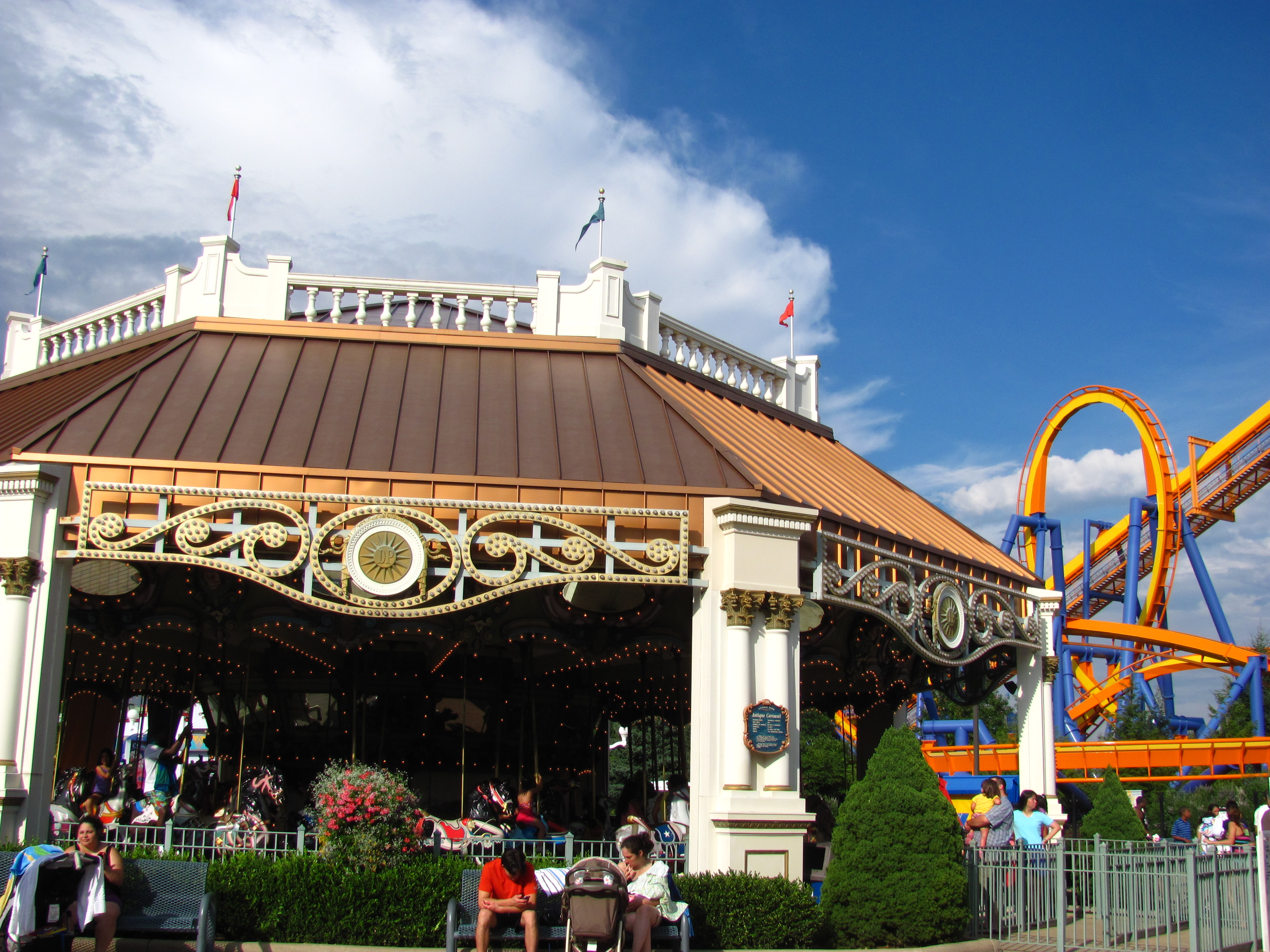
- Location: Sandusky, Ohio (official NRHP location)
- Coordinates: 41.4845°N 82.6925°W
- Built: 1921
- NRHP reference No.: 90000627
- Added to NRHP: November 8, 1990

The Antique Carousel (also known as the William H. Dentzel 1921 Carousel) is a historic carousel at Dorney Park in Dorneyville, Pennsylvania. It was built in 1921, and was added to the National Register of Historic Places in 1990. The carousel was previously located in Cedar Point in Sandusky, Ohio, and was moved to Dorney Park in 1995. Cedar Point is still mistakenly listed as its location on the NRHP database as of 2025. The carousel features 50 jumping horses; 12 stationary horses; four menagerie animals including a deer, giraffe, lion, and tiger; and two chariots. Music is provided by a Wurlitzer 153 band organ.

== History ==
The carousel was built in 1921 by the Dentzel Carousel Company for the Northern Illinois Fair Association, which operated the Central States Fair and Exposition Amusement Park in Aurora, Illinois. In 1941, the carousel was sold to Roger Haney of Lake Lansing Park South in Haslett, Michigan. It operated there for 29 years before being sold to Cedar Point in 1971. The ride was refurbished by Cedar Point Art Services & Restoration. Tom Layton painted additional murals to replace those that could not be restored. The original running boards were recast in fiberglass. The carousel was installed at the back of the park in a themed area known as Frontier Town, and opened in 1972 as the Frontiertown Carousel. This acquisition gave Cedar Point five historic carousels — one Müller, two Dentzels, one Allan Herschell miniature carousel, and a Prior and Church racing derby. The carousel operated in Frontier Town for the next 22 years. In 1992, parent company Cedar Fair acquired Dorney Park. Dorney Park had lost its historic 1915 PTC carousel in a fire on September 28, 1983. Cedar Fair closed the Frontiertown Carousel at the end of the 1994 season and moved it to Dorney Park for the 1995 season. The carousel was placed at the front of the midway in a building nearly identical to Cedar Point's Midway Carousel building.

== In popular culture ==
Consistent with several Dentzel carousels, a significant number of the horses on this example were the work of Daniel Carl Müller. Of particular interest is the military horse, which acquired the nickname of the "haunted horse". Adhering to common carousel design, the lead or "king" horse is typically the most detailed, frequently incorporating military accoutrements. This carousel's lead horse is a dark brown Civil War-era figure with a black mane and tail, distinguished by a military saddle that includes both a revolver and a sword — a rare feature for carousel horses. Tradition holds that this horse was a favorite of Müller's wife, and her spirit is said to have remained with it as the carousel was relocated. Employees reported unusual phenomena, including nocturnal carousel music and the unexplained repositioning of the horses overnight. When the carousel was moved to Dorney Park, the original haunted military horse was placed in storage; a replica of this horse is exhibited at the Merry-Go-Round Museum in Sandusky, Ohio.

== See also ==
- Amusement rides on the National Register of Historic Places
- Midway Carousel
- National Register of Historic Places listings in Sandusky, Ohio
