= Lake Lansing =

Lake in the state of Michigan, United States

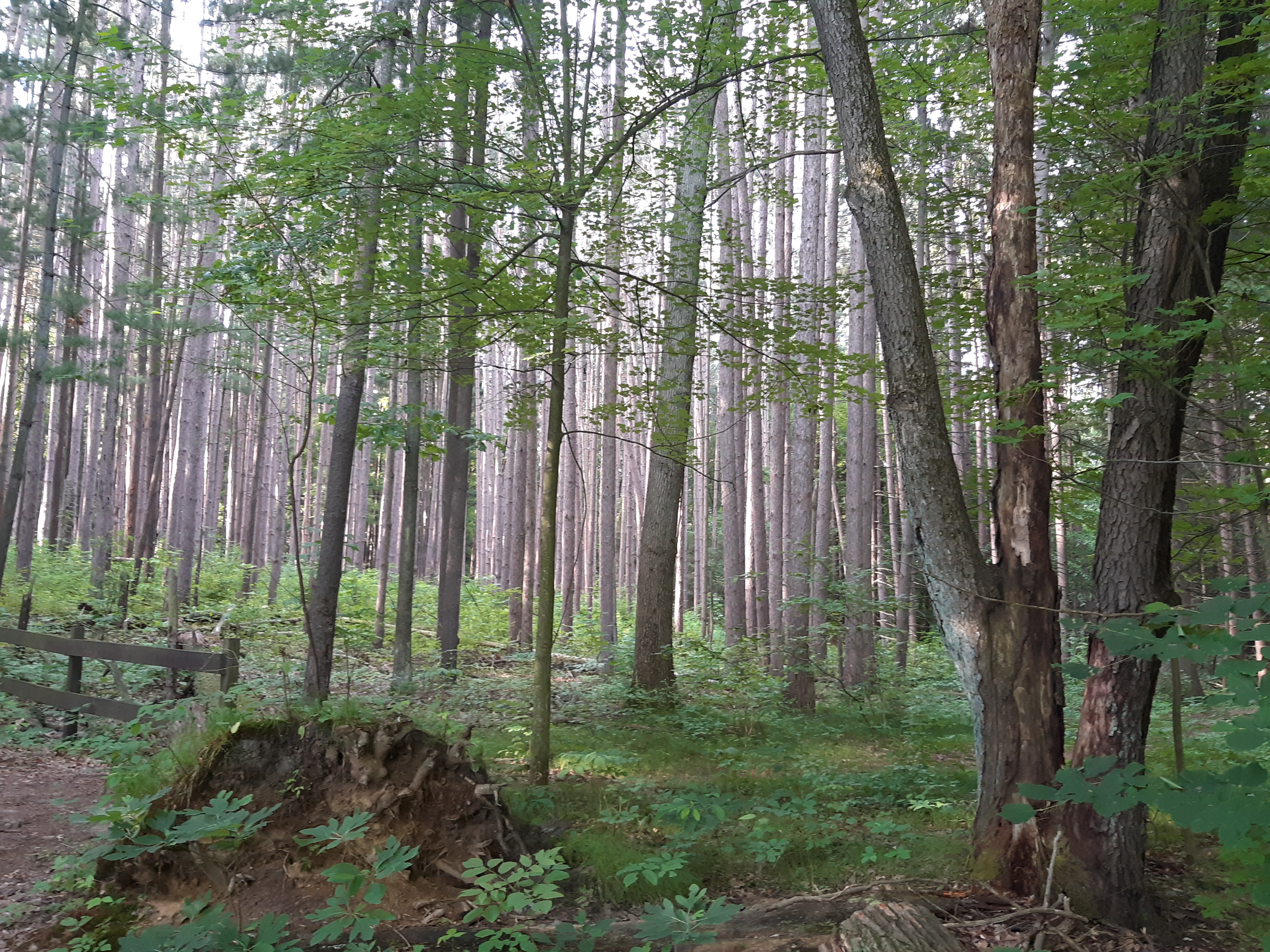
- Trees in Lake Lansing Park North Forest

- Location within Michigan
- Location: Haslett, Michigan
- Coordinates: 42°45′30″N 84°24′0″W
- Primary outflows: Pine Lake Outlet
- Basin countries: United States
- Max. length: 1.2 miles (1.9 km)
- Max. width: 1.0 mile (1.6 km)
- Surface area: 461 acres (1.9 km^{2})
- Max. depth: 34 feet (10.4 m)
- Surface elevation: 851.92 feet (259.7 m)
- Frozen: Seasonally
- Islands: None

Lake Lansing is a 461-acre (1.9 km^{2}) lake in Haslett, Michigan, a few miles northeast of the state's capital city of Lansing.

== Overview ==
Lake Lansing was originally known as Pine Lake, and was a highly popular recreation site in the early 1900s. The name was changed to Lake Lansing in 1930. The lake soon began to decline in recreational popularity, and was neglected for many decades until it was dredged in 1978, restoring the health of the lake. Around 280 residential homes surround the lake. Two sailing clubs also have property on the lake. In addition there are two public parks.

A special assessment district created by the township enables education, ongoing testing, evaluation and management of the lake to control weeds, encourage phosphorus free fertilization, round up geese and other activities to keep the lake healthy and safe for recreational use.

The Lake Lansing Property Owners Association maintains a communication system for property owners, works for safety on the lake, sponsors numerous social activities and advocates on behalf of its members on riparian rights and other issues.

=== Dam ===
On the northwest side of the lake is a small dam and level control structure which regulates discharge to the Pine Lake Outlet Drain. The structure consists of a gravity low-head dam 6 feet (1.8 m) in height with a concrete spillway 93 feet (28.3 m) wide, and next to it a 24-inch valved drawdown pipe. Stoplogs are placed at the top of the spillway during the summer months to maintain a higher lake level. A 2003 court order specifies that the lake shall be kept at 852.29 feet (259.8 m) above sea level in summer and 851.72 feet (259.6 m) in winter. Though the dam and spillway were originally constructed in the 1920s, the current structures were completed in 1976.

An inspection of the control structure by the county drain commissioner in December 2022 found the drawndown pipe inoperable, and an alternatives analysis of options to fix the control structure was ordered and then completed and published in December 2023.

== Sailing clubs ==
The Lansing Sailing Club sponsors an active program of racing and day sailing for sailboat owners as well as "learn to sail" programs for adults and junior sailing camps for students grades 5 thru 12.

The Michigan State University Sailing Center offers a "Learn to Sail" class, as well as other classes. The center also offers a variety of memberships that enable individuals to sail MSU Sailing Center boats.

== Public parks ==
Three public parks, one with trailer launching access, are operated by the Ingham County Parks Department. Lake Lansing Park South includes a band shell, boat rental, fishing dock, swimming beach, bath house, beach, volleyball courts, summer snack bar, horseshoe pits, picnic grounds, and shelters. Lake Lansing Park North is a 530-acre park with multiple hiking trails, playgrounds, and picnic areas. The Lake Lansing Boat Launch, located on the north side of Lake Lansing provides two boat launch ramps, a picnic area, basketball court, a powerboat washer and paved parking. Alcoholic beverages are prohibited in all of the parks.

== Fishing ==
Lake Lansing is home to several types of fish including: largemouth bass, smallmouth bass, northern pike, carp, crappie, bluegill, redear sunfish, perch, and several types of catfish.

== See also ==
- List of lakes in Michigan
