= Funfields =

Theme park in Whittlesea, Australia

- Previously known as Alpine Toboggan Park
- Interactive map of Funfields
- Location: Whittlesea, Victoria, Australia
- Coordinates: 37.520806°S 145.113087°E
- Status: Operating
- Opened: 2 February 1985
- Owner: Funfields Theme Park
- Slogan: The Ultimate One Day Holiday
- Operating season: November through April^{(primarily during Weekends, Public Holidays and School Holidays)}
- Area: 15.7 hectares (39 acres)

Attractions
- Total: 23
- Website: www.funfields.com.au

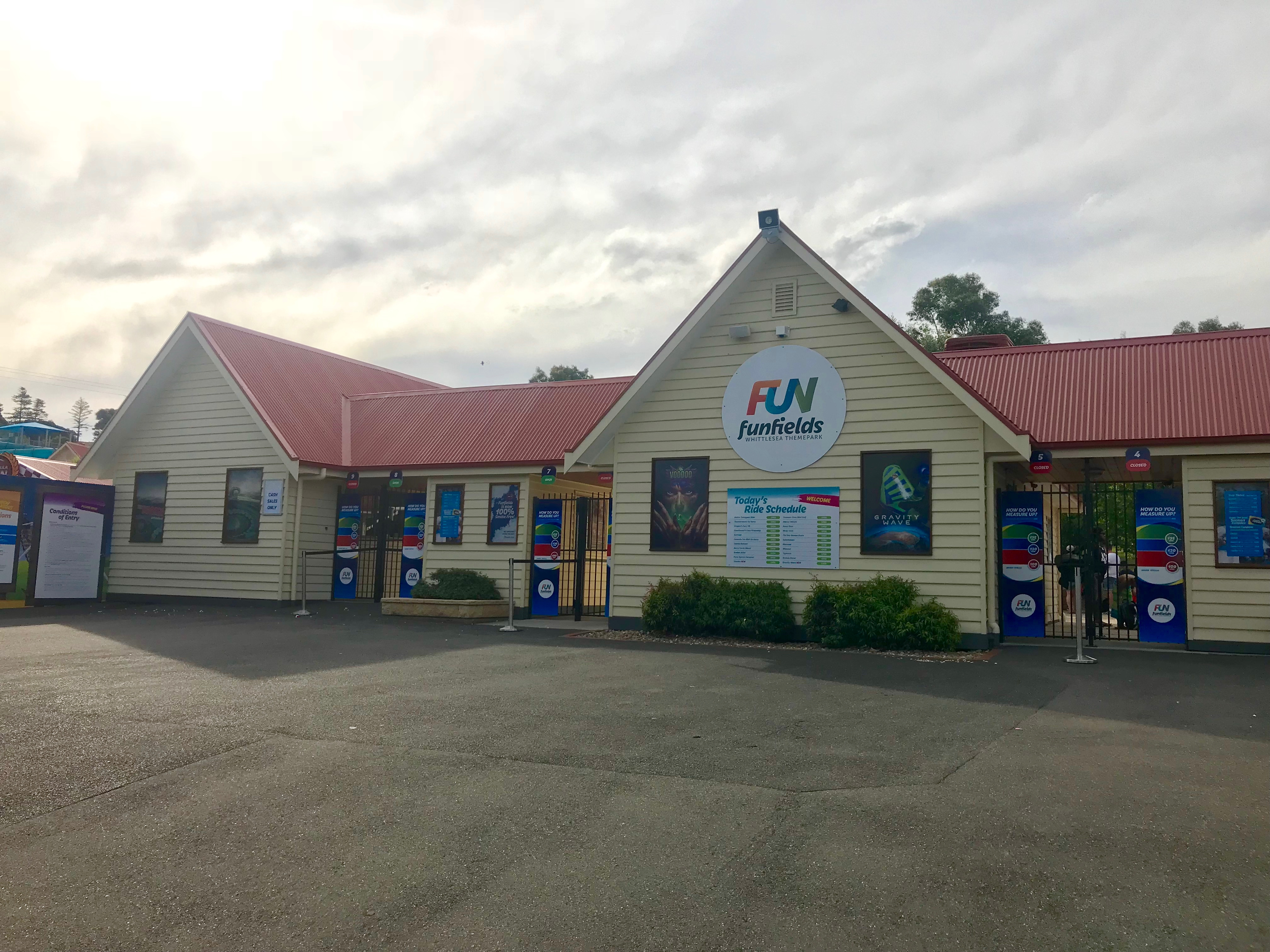
Funfields park entrance

Funfields (formerly Alpine Toboggan Park) is a 15.7-hectare (39-acre) theme park located in the suburban fringe town of Whittlesea, approximately 40 kilometres (25 mi) north of Melbourne, Australia. It is one of four major theme parks in Victoria. The park operates seasonally from November to April to align with Melbourne's climate, attracting over 200,000 visitors per season.

Originally established in 1985 as the Alpine Toboggan Park, the site was acquired by the Verga family in 1987. Since rebranding to Funfields in 2005, the park has transformed from a small picnic park into a major attraction. It is noted for its collection of ProSlide water slides, including several that held world records for length and height at the time of their opening. Its newest attractions include the Lava Lagoon lazy river and Cyber Drift bumper cars (both opened in 2024), joining the Supanova water slide (2022) and the heated Volcano Beach wave pool (2018).

== History ==
=== Early years (1984–2000) ===
Plans for the park were first lodged in February 1984 by local builder Bob Mayo and insurance broker Victor Colosimo. Initially met with some local opposition over noise concerns, the project was approved as the Alpine Toboggan Park. The park officially opened to the public on 2 February 1985, featuring a stainless steel toboggan track with a 650-metre (2,130 ft) downhill run.

In 1987, the park was acquired by John Verga, who oversaw its early development. The park's expansion, which included two in-ground water slides (now known as Splashdown), was completed for the 1986/87 summer season. Throughout the 1990s, the park operated with a small selection of attractions, including a small "Mini Car" track and the Crocodile Creek mini golf course. The major Thunderdome Go Kart track was added later in 1997.

=== Insurance Crisis and Rebranding (2000–2012) ===
In the early 2000s, the park faced significant challenges due to the Australian public liability insurance crisis, which threatened the viability of toboggan parks across the country. In 2002, the park's management provided evidence to an Australian Senate inquiry, highlighting the rapid escalation of insurance premiums for gravity-based rides. This external pressure accelerated the need to diversify the park's attractions beyond just the toboggan.

In 2005, the park officially rebranded from the Alpine Toboggan Park to Funfields. The name change was intended to reflect the park's shift from a single-attraction venue to a multi-ride amusement park. During this period, the park adopted a strategy of acquiring and refurbishing attractions from other Australian theme parks ("ride rescue"). Notable additions included the Blackbeard's Fury pirate ship (purchased from Sea World in 2009) and the Burnout ride (purchased from Dreamworld in 2012).

=== Expansion and marketing overhaul ===
A major turning point occurred following the installation of the Typhoon water slide in 2013. Despite the significant investment, the ride initially failed to attract the expected crowds. In response, the park engaged marketing expert John Dwyer to overhaul its advertising strategy. The new campaign, which focused heavily on the "world record" status of the park's thrill rides rather than its smaller attractions, was credited with turning the park into a major financial success and funding future expansions like Gravity Wave.

=== Permit controversy (2017) ===
In November 2017, a council audit revealed that the park had been operating in breach of its planning permit for 33 years. The original permit, issued in 1984, had formally capped attendance at just 450 patrons. However, by 2017, the park was regularly hosting over 4,000 visitors on peak days. The error was discovered when park management requested copies of old permits from the City of Whittlesea. Owner John Verga publicly stated he was unconcerned by the technical breach, citing the park's economic contribution to the region. The council subsequently resolved the issue by retrospectively updating the permit cap to 4,600 patrons plus season pass holders to match actual operations.

=== Recent developments (2018–present) ===
The park continued to expand its aquatic offerings with the opening of Volcano Beach, a heated outdoor wave pool, in December 2018. The accompanying "Mystic Kingdom" children's area was re-themed in 2019, adding new rides such as Dragon's Revenge.

In 2024, the park undertook its largest single investment to date—a $10 million redevelopment of the central precinct. This project involved permanently closing two long-standing attractions: the Thunderdome Go Karts and the Treasure Cove Mini Golf. The Go Kart site was redeveloped into the Lava Lagoon lazy river and Cyber Drift bumper cars (both opened on 26 December 2024), while the Mini Golf site was cleared to create expanded grassy picnic areas for guests.

The park remains a family-owned business. In 2025, one of the owner's daughters, Lilly Primerano, was appointed Attractions Manager, marking the continuation of the family's multi-generational management.

== Park layout and design ==
Funfields is situated on a naturally sloping site within the foothills of the Great Dividing Range. Unlike many theme parks that rely on steel towers for elevation, Funfields utilizes the site's natural topography for its major gravity-based attractions, including the Alpine Toboggan and the Gravity Wave water slide. The park's design is characterized by a "resort-style" aesthetic, featuring extensive landscaped lawns, palm trees, and permanent picnic shelters, distinguishing it from the concrete-dominated layouts of traditional amusement parks.

Major redevelopments in 2024 transformed the former Thunderdome Go Kart track into the Paradise Palms precinct. The asphalt track was removed to construct the Lava Lagoon water channel, while the former pit lane area was redeveloped into a large enclosed facility housing the Cyber Drift attraction. The precinct is visually anchored by a large artificial volcano structure overlooking the wave pool.

== Attractions ==
The park’s attractions are divided into seven themed regions.

=== Thrill Hill ===
Dedicated to high-speed gravity slides.

Name	Opened	Manufacturer	Description
Gravity Wave	2017	ProSlide	A 186-metre (610 ft) long, 26.8-metre (88 ft) tall partially enclosed raft slide. At the time of its opening, it was the tallest and longest ProSlide "Wave" slide in the world.
Supanova	2022	ProSlide	A 250-metre (820 ft) long, 27-metre (89 ft) high hybrid waterslide. It features an 18-metre (59 ft) funnel and a "flying saucer" element.
Typhoon	2013	ProSlide	A 137-metre (449 ft) long Cannonbowl waterslide. It features a 19-metre (62 ft) drop and reaches speeds in excess of 30 kilometres per hour (19 mph).
Kraken Racer	2015	ProSlide	A 113-metre (371 ft) long, four-lane racing slide. Riders lie on mats and can reach speeds of over 60 kilometres per hour (37 mph).

=== Velocity Valley ===
A zone focused on speed-based dry attractions.

Name	Opened	Manufacturer	Description
Cyber Drift Bumper Cars	2024		A futuristic bumper car attraction featuring a neon-lit cyberpunk theme and pixel-activated ceiling lighting. Housed in a dedicated enclosed facility on the site of the former Go Kart pit lane.
Alpine Toboggan Slide	1985	Wiegan	A stainless steel toboggan track featuring a 650-metre (2,130 ft) downhill run and a 400-metre (1,300 ft) uphill tow.
Voodoo 360	2017	Zamperla	An 18-metre (59 ft) tall pendulum ride that swings 360 degrees.
Blackbeard's Fury	2009	HUSS Park Attractions	A 15-metre (49 ft) tall Pirate ship ride. Previously operated at Sea World from 1984 to 2009.

=== Paradise Palms ===
A tropical-resort themed zone.

Name	Opened	Manufacturer	Description
Lava Lagoon Lazy River	2024		A heated tropical lazy river holding over 2 million litres of water with a zero-depth entry. Built on the former site of the Thunderdome Go Karts.
Volcano Beach	2018	ProSlide	A 2,000 square metres (22,000 sq ft) heated wave pool, capable of producing 1-metre (3.3 ft) high waves.

=== Origin Springs ===
The location of the park's original water attractions.

Name	Opened	Manufacturer	Description
Blackout	2009	Australian Waterslides and Leisure	A 120-metre (390 ft) fully enclosed tube slide. Pitch black darkness is experienced whilst riding.
Wipeout	2010	Australian Waterslides and Leisure	A 130-metre (430 ft) long translucent, fully enclosed tube slide with a large sudden drop at the finish.
Splashdown	1987	Unknown	The first waterslides to be built at the park. Two near-identical 65-metre (213 ft) in-ground waterslides.

=== Mystic Kingdom ===
A medieval-themed area dedicated to younger children. The zone also features a Fairy Garden and an interactive Talking Tree.

Name	Opened	Manufacturer	Description
Dragons Revenge	2019	SBF Rides	A high speed spinning ride with an interactive joystick to control height. Replaced the Burnout ride.
Pegasus Sky Bounce	2019	SBF Rides	A 7-metre (23 ft) tall drop tower with 8 seats.
Pony Xpress Carousel			A carousel ride.
Berry Ferris Wheel	2015	Zamperla	An 8-metre (26 ft) tall mini Ferris wheel with 6 carriages.
Samba Balloon	2015	Zamperla	A children’s balloon ride.
Snakes Alive	2012	The Australian Carousel Company	A children’s spinning cup ride. Relocated from Australia Zoo.

=== Amazonia Falls ===
Name	Opened	Manufacturer	Description
Amazonia Falls	2011	Wizard Works	A multi-level children's water playground with a giant tipping bucket.
Birdy Cove	2016	White Water West	A water playground for toddlers featuring small waterslides, watercoasters and a paddle pool.
Tiki Bay Bumper Boats	2004	J&J Amusements, Inc.	Electric bumper boats in a dedicated pool.

== Former attractions ==
Name	Opened	Closed	Manufacturer	Description
Thunderdome Go Karts	1997	2024	J&J Amusements	A major concrete race track with go-karts. Closed in 2024 to make way for the Lava Lagoon and Cyber Drift attractions.
Treasure Cove Mini Golf	1997	2024	E.D.C.	An 18-hole course. Originally opened as the swamp-themed "Crocodile Creek", it was re-themed to "Treasure Cove" in 2015. It was demolished in 2024 to create additional lawn space for picnics.
Burnout	2012	2019	Chance Rides	A spinning Trabant ride. Originally operated at Dreamworld as Stingray (1983–2012) before being purchased by Funfields.
Mini Cars	1993	2004	ProSlide	A small children's car ride that predated the Thunderdome.

== Facilities and services ==
Funfields operates on a single-charge, height-based admission model, which includes unlimited access to all rides and attractions that meet the guest's height requirements. This all-inclusive structure, first introduced during the park's expansion in the late 1990s, differentiates the park from pay-per-ride attractions. In addition to standard entry, the park offers an optional "Fast Pass" upgrade, which allows guests to utilize a dedicated express queue for up to eight rides.

The park is divided into wet and dry recreational zones, each with specific amenities:

- Picnic Plains: A dedicated picnic area equipped with coin-operated communal barbecues. This area is designed for guests utilizing the BYO food policy. In 2024, this area was expanded following the removal of the Mini Golf course.
- The Beach Club: A café and licensed al fresco bar, opened during the 2025/26 season. It replaced a smaller kiosk previously located in the Volcano Beach area and is the only outlet in the park licensed to serve alcohol (beer, wine, and cocktails).
- Funfields Kitchen: A centralized food precinct housing three separate kiosk-style outlets: a Café & Pizza Bar, a Candy Shop (selling lollies and showbags), and a Coffee Shop.
- Refresh: A dedicated dessert and beverage outlet serving ice creams, sorbets, fresh juices, smoothies, acai bowls, and featuring a chocolate fountain.
- Retail: A dedicated Gift Shop stocks park merchandise as well as essential supplies such as sunscreen, goggles, hats, and thongs. It also sells physical gift cards and branded apparel from major labels such as Rip Curl.
- VIP Cabanas: Private cabanas are available for rent in the Birdy Cove, Volcano Beach, and Lava Lagoon precincts. These premium areas offer exclusive seating, secured storage, and food delivery services.

== Events ==
Since the 1990s, Funfields has hosted an annual Easter Egg Hunt on Easter Saturday. The event has grown from a small local activity to a major regional attraction involving thousands of eggs distributed across the park's lawn areas.

== Community impact and awards ==
Funfields is a significant economic contributor to the City of Whittlesea, employing over 200 staff during peak periods. It is widely recognised as one of the region's largest employers of youth. The park's attractions have received international recognition, with the Gravity Wave slide recognized as the "World's Biggest, Longest & Tallest ProSlide Wave" at the time of its opening.

The park has occasionally faced community opposition regarding its expansion. In November 2017, the park's application to increase its permitted patron capacity from 450 to 4,600 and extend operating hours was met with objections from local residents concerned about increased noise and traffic congestion on Plenty Road. While the permit at the time capped attendance at 450, actual attendance figures had exceeded this for many years; the Council ultimately approved the application to retrospectively align the permit with the park's actual operations.

In January 2023, the park received media attention for a "goodwill gesture" involving parking fines. After overflow parking confusion led to approximately 40 guests receiving fines from the City of Whittlesea for parking on a nature strip, park management voluntarily paid the fines (totaling over $3,000) on behalf of their patrons, with Managing Director Angelo Dinardo stating he did not want families "leaving with a sour taste".

== Access ==
The park is accessible via public transport from the Melbourne CBD, with the journey taking approximately 90 minutes one way. Park visitors can take a Mernda line train to Mernda (the end of the line), then connect to PTV bus route 382 (Whittlesea to Northland Shopping Centre), which stops directly outside the park entrance at the "Retland Drive on Plenty Road" stop.

By car, the park is approximately 40–50 minutes from the Melbourne CBD via Plenty Road. Extensive on-site parking is available for guests.
