= Lake Lansing Park South =

Park in Haslett, Ingham County, United States of America

- Location within Michigan
- Location: Ingham County, Michigan, US
- Nearest city: Haslett, Michigan
- Coordinates: 42°45′20″N 84°24′25″W
- Area: 30 acres (0.047 mi^{2})
- Established: 1974
- Governing body: Ingham County

Lake Lansing Park South is a public park in Haslett, Michigan covering 30 acres (0.047 mi^{2}). The entrance to the park is located at 1621 Pike Street. Lake Lansing Park South offers a beach, bathhouse, multi-purpose dock, a playground near the beach, covered picnic tables, and a snack bar that is open during the summer months.

Parking is available on the north side of the park. There is a vehicle entrance fee of $3(USD) for Ingham County residents, and $5(USD) for non residents.

== Amusement Park ==
The location was once home to a popular amusement park, which was established in 1910. By the 1940s, the amusement park had become a popular destination for both locals and visitors to the area. A wooden rollercoaster was in operation at the park for over 60 years. In 1971 the park's carousel was sold to Cedar Point - a popular amusement park in Ohio. Around the same time, the park's rollercoaster was shut down due to safety concerns. The amusement park closed its doors in 1974, with the land subsequently acquired by Ingham County.

== See also ==
- List of lakes in Michigan
- Lake Lansing Park North
- Lake Lansing
