= Ankapark =

Abandoned amusement park in Turkey

Wonderland Eurasia
- Previously known as Ankapark (2013–2019)
- Interactive map of Wonderland Eurasia
- Location: Ankara, Turkey
- Coordinates: 39.9449°N 32.7886°E
- Status: Defunct
- Opened: 20 March 2019
- Closed: February 2020

Attractions
- Roller coasters: 17

Ankapark, officially Wonderland Eurasia, is an abandoned amusement park in Ankara, Turkey. Opened in 2019, the park had 17 roller coasters, the second-most worldwide. It was closed permanently in February 2020, though most of the permanent rides, and structures remain largely intact.

== History ==
In 2013, the 27th mayor of Ankara, Melih Gökçek, requested name suggestions for a new amusement park that would be located on the Atatürk Forest Farm and Zoo's property, land originally bequeathed by Turkey's founder, Mustafa Kemal Atatürk. On 10 July 2014, work was halted initially by the 14th Chamber Council of State due to concerns of ‘tarnishing the legacy’ of the land. In December 2014, work was halted yet again by the Administrative Court of Ankara over the land usage. By May 2015, a roller coaster and ferris wheel were tested and opened to the public. An overpass to the park was under construction in September 2016.

By August 2017, the park was nearly completed. In October 2017, construction began on an underpass to allow easier access to the park's entrance. In November 2017, the total project had incurred a cost of 2B TL (US$800m) according to the then-28th mayor of Ankara, Mustafa Tuna. In September 2018, GBM Ticaret-Çelik acquired the lease to the park for 29 years. In January 2019, it was announced that the park would open on 25 March 2019, after all certifications were completed. The park was given the new name of Wonderland Eurasia ahead of its opening, along with an announcement by Turkey's President Recep Tayyip Erdoğan stating that the park would open earlier than predicted. On 20 March 2019, the park finally opened to the public. It closed permanently in February 2020 following an initial year of low attendance, along with the ensuing COVID-19 pandemic. The park had cost a total of more than US$800m, according to the Ankara Metropolitan Municipality.

In July 2022, the Ankara Metropolitan Municipality acquired the park following a court ruling. Afterward, the Ankara Metropolitan Municipality surveyed Ankara residents on how the park's site should be used. The survey showed that Ankara residents wanted the site to be redeveloped into a green area.

== Reopening ==
On 2 August 2026, Ankapark was reopened to visitors after several years of closure. The reopening included public green areas, walking paths and recreational facilities, while the amusement park section remained closed for maintenance.

== List of attractions ==
As of January 2019, there were 17 roller coasters constructed for the park. It tied with Cedar Point and Canada's Wonderland for the third-most in the world behind Energylandia which has 18, and Six Flags Magic Mountain, which has 20.

Name	Translation	Manufacturer
Altin Madeni Coaster	Gold Mine Coaster	SBF Visa Group
Ejderha Uçuşu	Dragon Flight	Zierer
Seydi Reis	No translation	—N/a
Girdap Sörfçüler	Vortex Surfers	Interpark
Mouse Coaster	English name	Levent Lunapark
Öksökö Öfkesi	Anger of Öksökö	Beijing Shibaolai Amusement Equipment
Uzaya Yolculuk	Space Trip	Beijing Shibaolai Amusement Equipment
Misket Coaster	English name	—N/a
Lightspeed	English name	Intamin
Köpekbalığı Girdabı	Shark Swirl	—N/a
Çelik Kartal	Steel Eagle	Zamperla
Miğfer	Helmet	SBF Visa Group
Devin Kileri	Giant's Cellar	Zierer
Canavar Dalga	Monster Wave	Intamin
Lav Macerası	Lava Adventure	I.E. Park
Power Mouse Coaster	English name	Fabbri
Volare Hiz Kizagi	—N/a	Zamperla
