= Trans Studio Cibubur =

Mixed-development complex in Indonesia

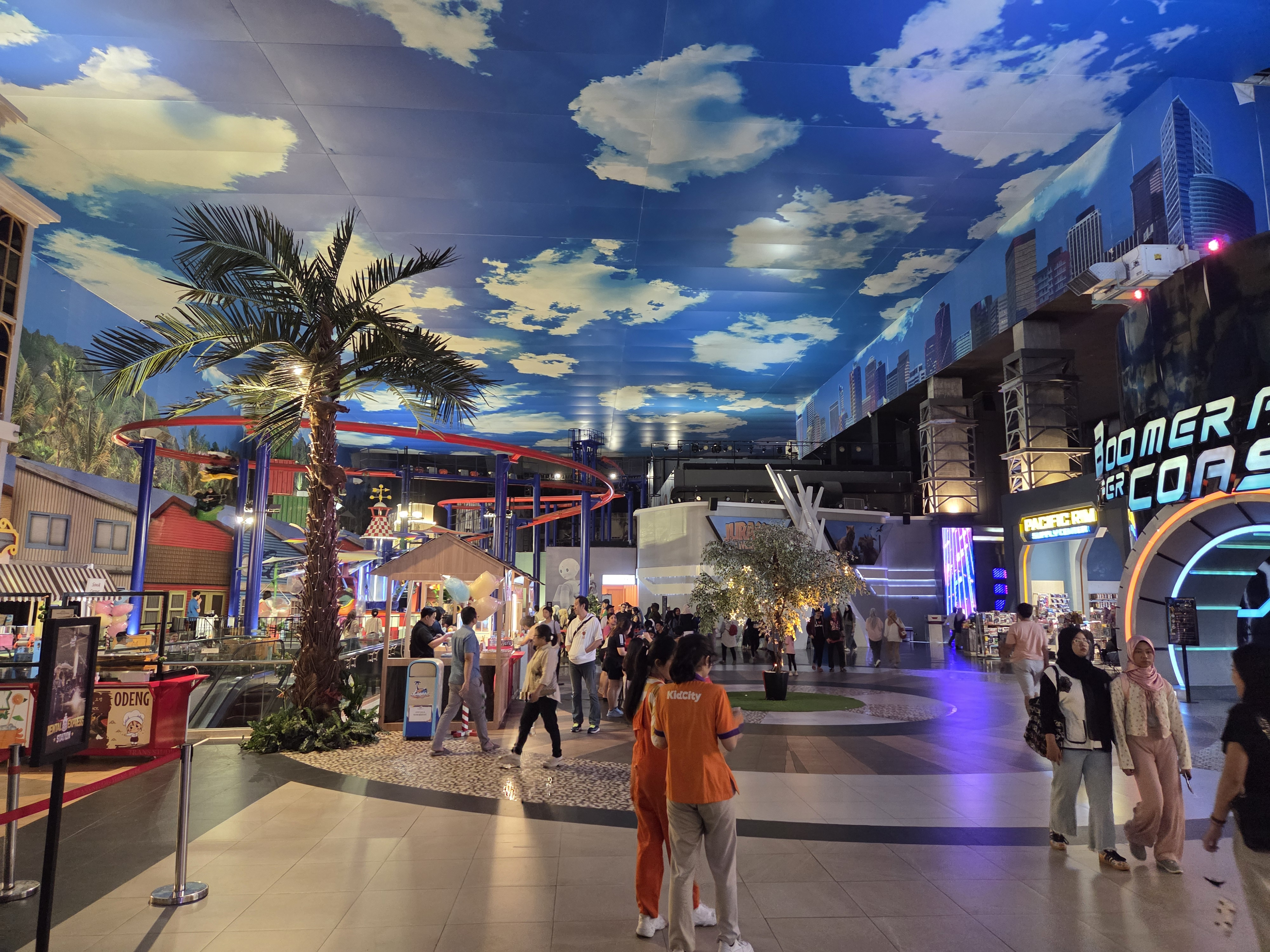
- The amusement park section

- Location in Depok
- Location: Depok, West Java, Indonesia
- Coordinates: 6.375656°S 106.901736°E
- Status: Operating
- Public transit: Harjamukti
- Opened: 11 July 2019
- Owner: CT Corp

Attractions
- Roller coasters: 3
- Website: transshoppingmall.com

Trans Studio Cibubur is a mixed development complex at Depok, West Java, within the Jakarta metropolitan area of Indonesia. Built on 4.1 ha (10 acres) land, the complex consists of a shopping mall, an indoor amusement park, three apartment towers, and a luxury hotel.

== Amusement park section ==
The amusement park has five sections. There are 14 rides within the park, including Zombie Wars (an interactive dark ride), a Boomerang roller coaster that originally operated at Knott's Berry Farm, and two smaller roller coasters. The park opened on 11 July 2019. Daan Duijm serves as the park's general manager.

== Shopping mall ==
The mall, known as Trans Studio Mall Cibubur, has 5 floors with an area of about 100,000 square metres (1,100,000 sq ft). It was opened on 5 April 2019. There are around 200 tenants, including national and international brands; the main tenants are Metro Department Store, H&M, Uniqlo, Transmart, and Cinema XXI.

== See also ==
- Trans Studio Makassar
- Trans Studio Bandung
