= Wild Kitty =

Defunct junior roller coaster

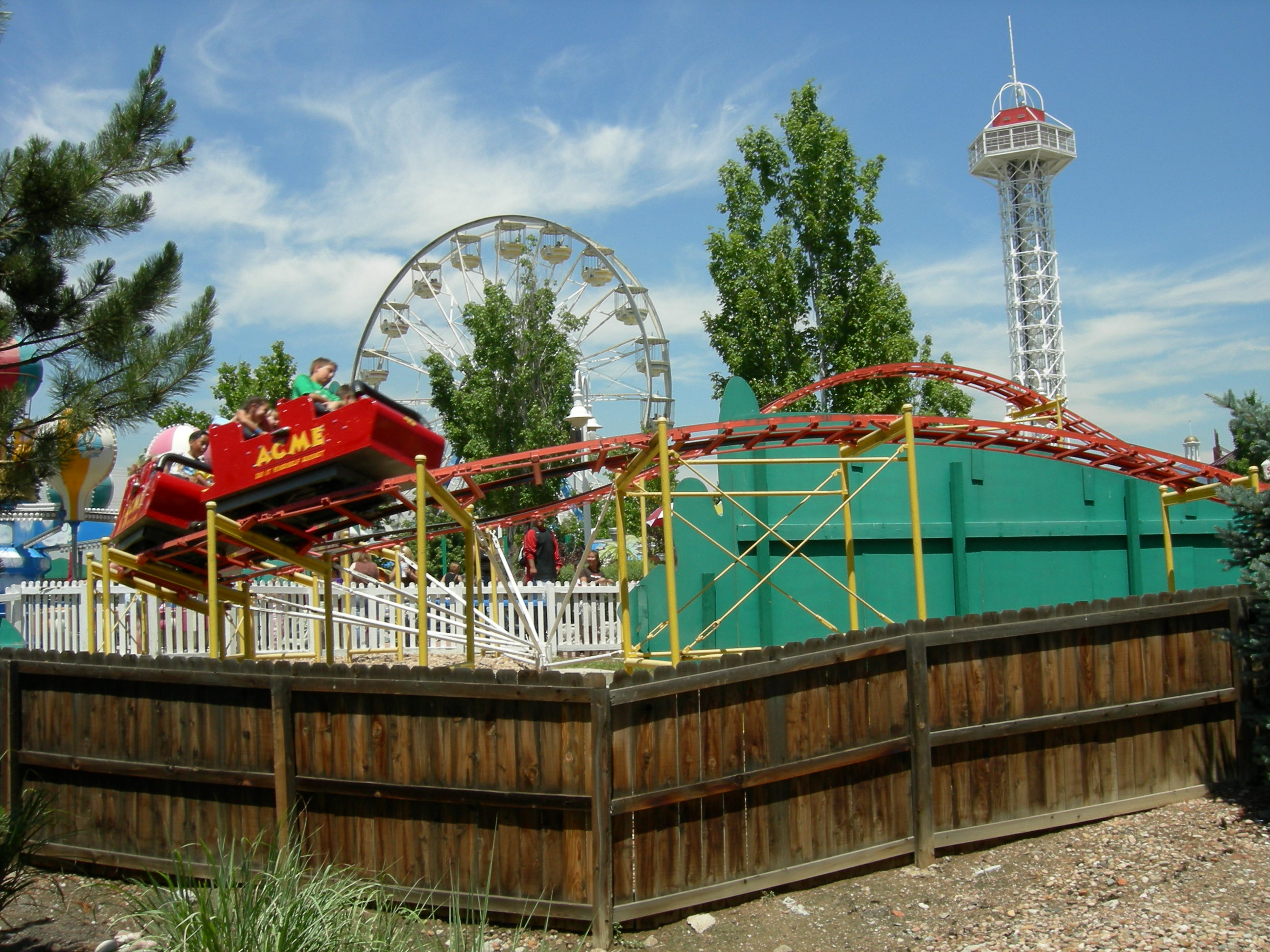
- Wild Kitty at Elitch Gardens

Frontier City
- Coordinates: 35.5861°N 97.4394°W
- Status: Removed
- Opening date: April 7, 2013
- Closing date: 2019
- Replaced: Wild Kitty (1991-2012)
- Replaced by: Frankie’s Mine Train

Elitch Gardens
- Coordinates: 39.749215°N 105.012059°W
- Status: Removed
- Opening date: May 27, 1995
- Closing date: October 28, 2012
- Replaced by: Blazin' Buckaroo

General statistics
- Type: Steel
- Manufacturer: Allan Herschell Company
- Model: Little Dipper
- Track layout: Oval
- Height: 12 ft (3.7 m)
- Inversions: 0
- Capacity: 100 riders per hour
- Trains: Single train with 3 cars; riders arranged 2 across in 2 rows for a total of 12 riders per train
- Wild Kitty at RCDB

Wild Kitty was a children's steel roller coaster. It was located at Elitch Gardens Theme Park in Denver, Colorado, from 1995 to 2012, then was relocated to Frontier City in Oklahoma City, Oklahoma, in 2013. It closed at the end of the 2018 season and was replaced by Frankie's Mine Train. It was a simple junior roller coaster with a single lift hill and several small bunny hills laid out in an oval. The train made three loops around the track.

== History ==
Wild Kitty first appeared at Elitch Gardens in Denver, Colorado. The ride reopened on May 27, 1995 under the name Wild Kitten. The Wild Kitten name stayed until Six Flags purchased the park and themed the ride to Great Chase in 1999 after the Looney Tunes. In 2007, when PARC Management bought the park from Six Flags, Warner Bros. was dropped from the park. With the removal of the Looney Tunes theme, the ride was renamed to Tombstone Tumbler. Then in 2008 the park renamed the ride to Cactus Coaster.

In late 2012, Cactus Coaster was removed from Elitch Gardens and was transported to replace a coaster at Frontier City, Wild Kitty which operated from 1995-2012. Wild Kitty was removed at the end of the 2018 operating season and was replaced by Frankie’s Mine Train.
