= Lionsgate Entertainment World =

Theme park in Guangdong Province, China

- Location: Hengqin, Zhuhai, Guangdong, China
- Status: Operating
- Opened: 31 July 2019; 6 years ago
- Owner: Starz Entertainment
- Theme: Lionsgate characters
- Website: Official website

Lionsgate Entertainment World, officially abbreviated to LEW, is a theme park found on Hengqin Island, Guangdong Province, China. The park opened on July 31, 2019 as the first Lionsgate Theme Park. Designed by the Thinkwell Group, the park is the first of its kind dubbed "the world's first vertical theme park."

== History ==
In November 2016, it was announced that Lionsgate was looking to expand its brand into the theme park world, hiring the Thinkwell Group to lead the design project of a new theme park based in China. Originally slated to open in 2018, the indoor theme park was set to spread across 237,000 square-feet. The five-and-a-half-acre indoor theme park was announced to be opening with over 30 attractions, based on popular franchises like The Hunger Games, The Twilight Saga and Now You See Me. In an announcement in May 2019, Lionsgate mentioned they expected the park to have around 1.5 million theme park guests in 2019 alone. In June 2020, Variety reported that the theme park will reopen on June 24, after being closed for months due to the COVID-19 pandemic.

== Examples of attractions ==
- The Hunger Games: Mockingjay Flight - Rebel Escape
- The Twilight Saga: Midnight Ride
- The Twilight Saga: Bella's Journey
- Gods of Egypt: Battle for Eternity
- Escape Plan
- Chasm Challenge Course
