= Trans Studio Samarinda =

Theme park and hotel in Samarinda, Borneo, Indonesia

- Interactive map of Trans Studio Samarinda
- Location: Dadi Mulya, Samarinda Ulu, Samarinda, East Kalimantan, Indonesia
- Coordinates: 0.491°S 117.144°E
- Status: Defunct
- Owner: Para Group
- Operating season: All year round
- Area: 20 ha (49 acres)

Trans Studio Samarinda is a cancelled theme park project, planned at Dadi Mulya, Samarinda Ulu, Samarinda, Indonesia. Construction of the theme park and the hotel would start in 2012. It was the first Trans Studio theme park to be built in Borneo. The plans for the park were unveiled to the public when Trans Studio Makassar signed a tourism agreement on 22 October 2009. Trans Studio marketed the park as a "family indoor theme park".
