= Frankie's Mine Train =

Steel roller coaster

Frankie’s Mine Train
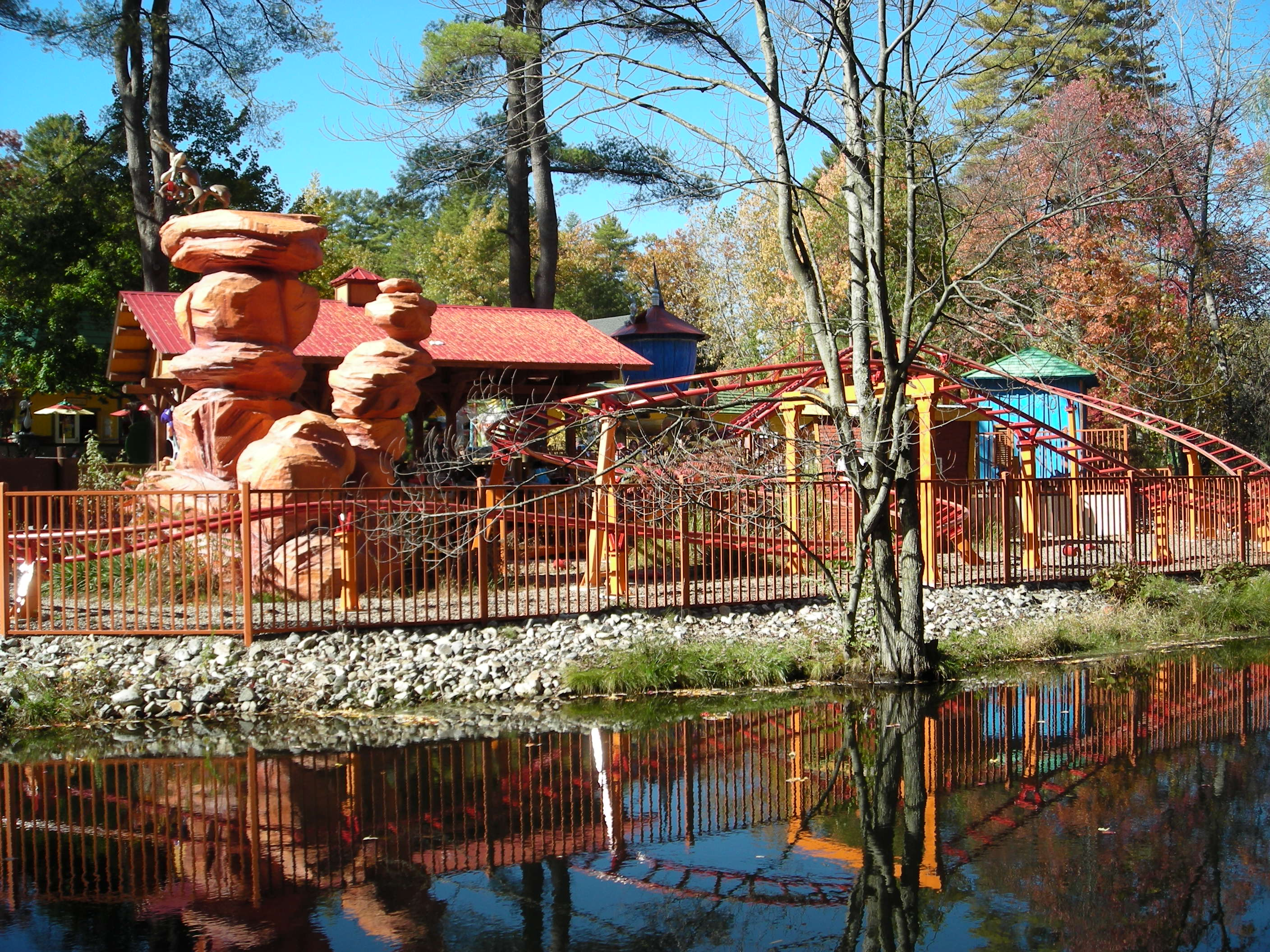
- Frankie's Mine Train at Great Escape in 2007, when it was known as Road Runner Express

Great Escape by Enchanted Parks
- Coordinates: 43°21′02.4″N 73°41′21.9″W
- Status: Operating
- Opening date: May 2005

Frontier City
- Coordinates: 35°35′09.9″N 97°26′22.3″W
- Status: Operating
- Opening date: May 25, 2019
- Frankie's Mine Train at Frontier City at RCDB

General statistics
- Type: Steel – Junior
- Manufacturer: Zamperla
- Model: Family Coaster
- Lift/launch system: Chain lift hill
- Height: 13 ft (4.0 m)
- Length: 262.5 ft (80.0 m)
- Height restriction: 42 in (107 cm)
- Trains: Single train with 6 cars. Riders are arranged 2 across in a single row for a total of 12 riders per train.
- Go Fast Pass Available at Frontier City
- Frankie’s Mine Train at RCDB

Frankie's Mine Train is a steel children's roller coaster located at two amusement parks in the United States. Both parks were operated by Six Flags during the time the rides were installed.

== Installations ==
Locations for Frankie’s Mine Train
| Park | Area | Opened | Status | Reference |
|---|---|---|---|---|
| Great Escape | Timbertown | May 2005 | Operating | |
| Frontier City | Timbertown | May 25, 2019 | Operating | |

=== Great Escape ===
In 2005, Great Escape, known then as The Great Escape & Splashwater Kingdom, debuted Looney Tunes National Park, a Looney Tunes-themed children's area featuring eight new children's rides, including Road Runner Express, a roller coaster. In late 2010, the park began the process of removing licensed theming from attractions, including in Looney Tunes National Park. The section was renamed and rethemed to Timbertown, and all of the rides in the section received new names as well. Road Runner Express was renamed to Frankie's Mine Train.

=== Frontier City ===
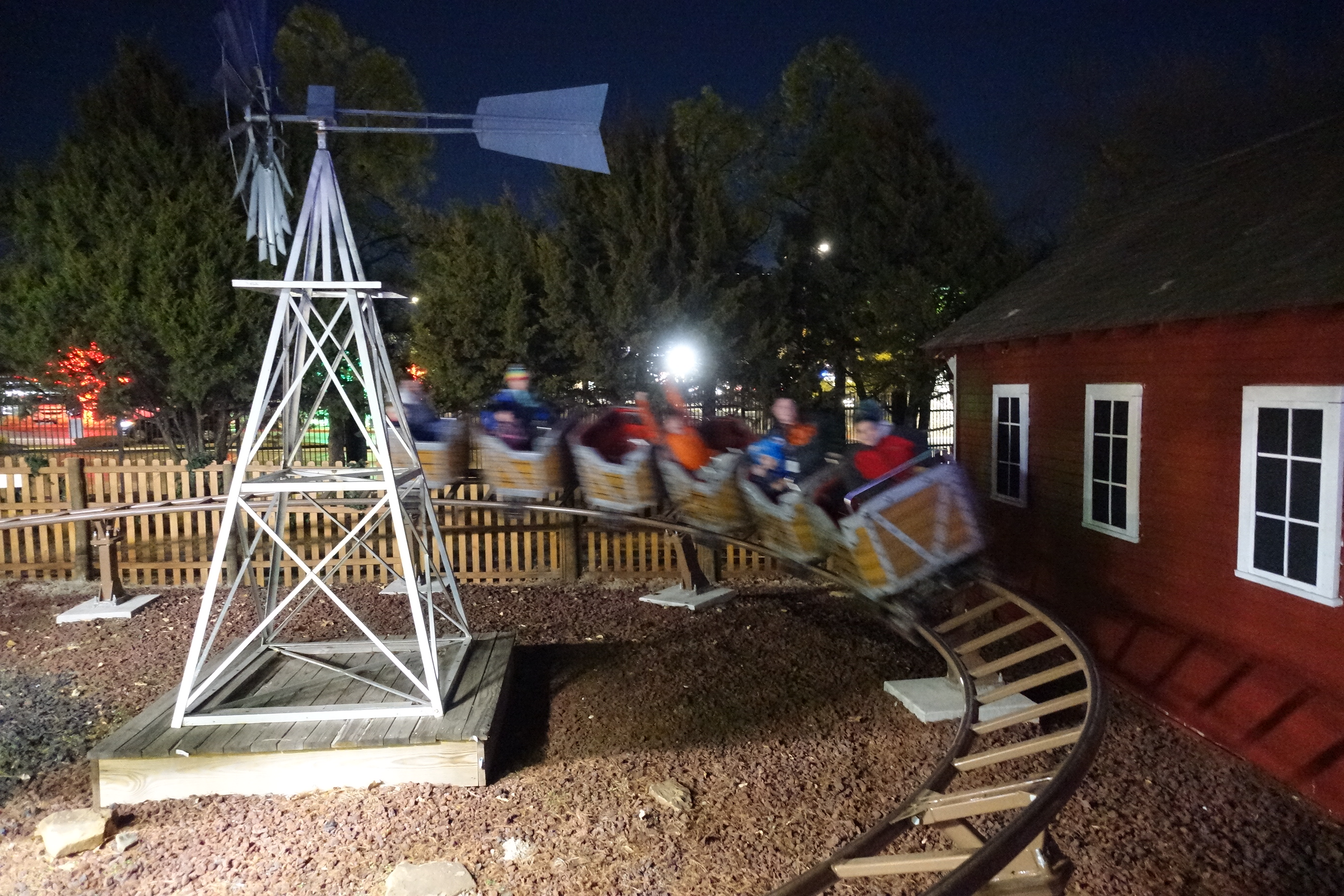
Frankie's Mine Train at Frontier City in 2021

Frontier City was acquired by Six Flags in 2018, and a new children's area was introduced the following year for 2019. Wild Kitty, a similar children's coaster at the park, was removed to make way for the new area. A new coaster was then installed in Wild Kitty's former location. It was called Frankie's Mine Train, and is the same ride model as the coaster of the same name at Six Flags Great Escape and Hurricane Harbor.
