= Trans Studio Bandung =

Amusement park in Bandung, Indonesia

Trans Studio Mall Bandung
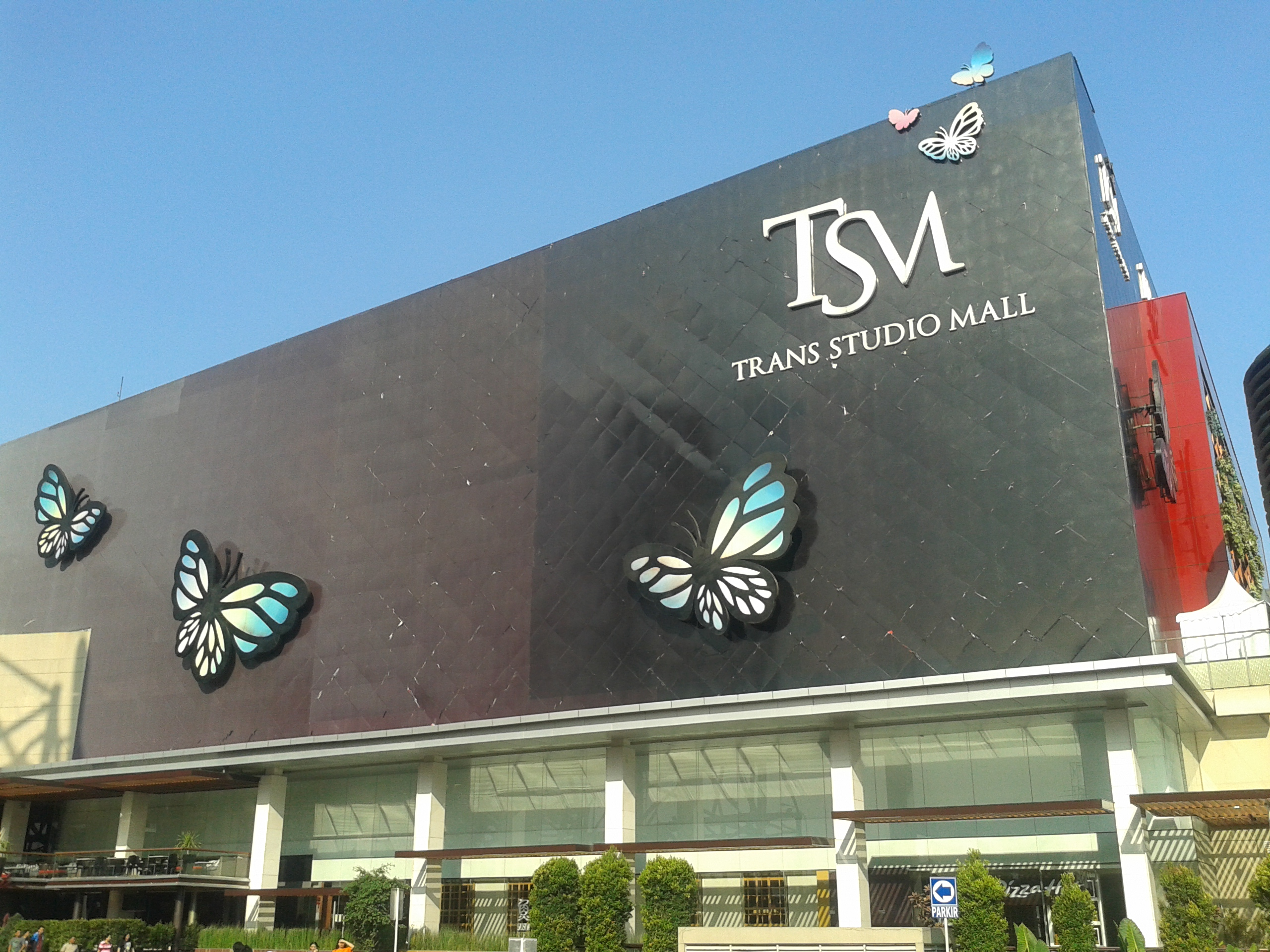
- Trans Studio Mall in 2014
- Location: Bandung
- Coordinates: 6°55′34.27″S 107°38′10.4″E
- Address: Jalan Jenderal Gatot Subroto no. 289
- Opened: October 25, 2001; 25 years ago
- Previous names: Bandung Supermall
- Floors: 5
- Public transit: Feeder Metro Jabar Trans: Halte Trans Studio Mall
- Website: transshoppingmall.com

Trans Studio Bandung is a mixed-use development in Jalan Gatot Subroto of Bandung, Indonesia, built on a land with size of 4.2 ha (10 acres). It is part of the CT Corp, owned by Chairul Tanjung. Trans Studio Bandung is composed of several sections including a shopping mall called Trans Studio Mall, an amusement park called Trans Studio, a 3-star hotel called ibis Bandung Trans Studio, and a 5-star luxury hotel called The Trans Luxury Hotel.

== Trans Studio Mall Bandung ==
Trans Studio Mall Bandung (TSM Bandung) is the largest shopping mall in Bandung, and has 5 floors in total. It was opened on October 25, 2001, under the name Bandung Supermall, until it was renamed to Trans Studio Mall Bandung on June 30, 2012.

=== Tenants ===
Trans Studio Mall Bandung has both local as well as international tenants. Some of the most notable local tenants are: Batik Keris, Bebek Garang, Metro, Gramedia, Hero Supermarket, and many others. Some of the most notable international tenants are: Guess, Hugo Boss, Lacoste, Mango, Nike, Starbucks Coffee and many more. Most of the luxury brand stores are located on the first level, while the fourth level has mostly cafes and restaurants. There is also a movie theater, TSM XXI, located on the fifth floor.

=== Notable events ===
On April 14, 2015, the mall hosted a fashion show called FASHIONATIC2015. It focused on local Indonesian cultural fashion, such as batik. On October 31, 2015, the mall also hosted a Halloween Party where there were of people dressed like a ghost.

On March 19, 2016, the mall participated in Earth day with a blackout starting from 8:30.

== Trans Studio Bandung ==
Trans Studio Bandung
- Interactive map of Trans Studio Bandung
- Status: Operating
- Opened: 18 June 2011; 15 years ago
- Owner: Carrefour
- Area: 10,378 acres (4,200 ha)

Attractions
- Total: 20 rides
- Roller coasters: 1
- Website: transstudiobandung.com

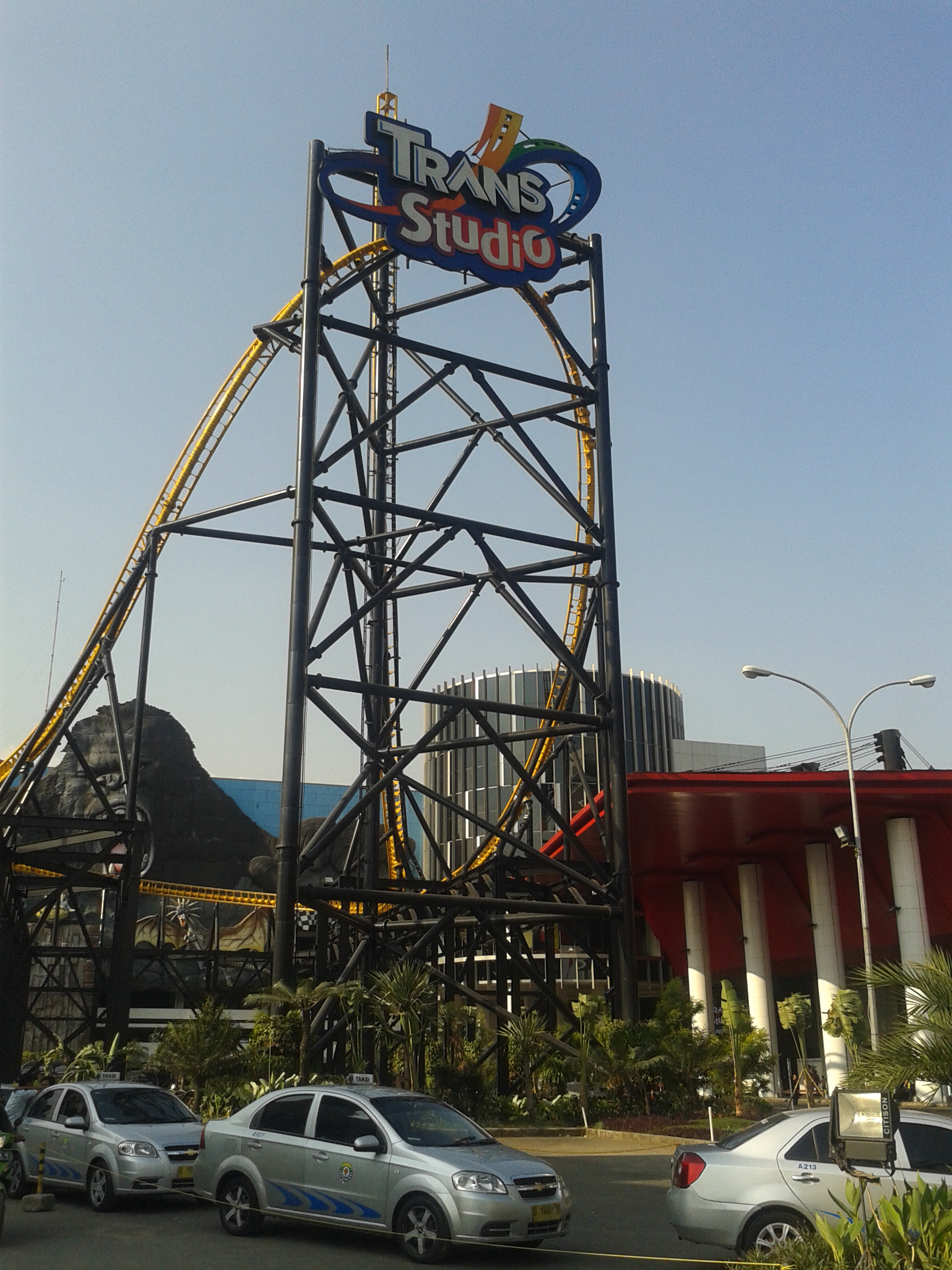
Trans Studio Bandung.

Trans Studio Bandung Theme Park is one of the biggest indoor theme parks in the world. It was opened on June 18, 2011 in the area of Bandung Supermall as the second theme park in Indonesia after Trans Studio Makassar, which was opened in 2008. The attractions in Trans Studio Bandung are more adventurous and challenging since they mainly target young adults, whereas the ones in Makassar are more suitable for family. Trans Studio Bandung theme park is divided into 3 different themes with a total of 20 rides.

=== Studio Central ===
The Studio Central section has an old Hollywood theme. Visitors can see a number of Hollywood artists such as Marilyn Monroe, Michael Jackson & Jeng Kelin on the Walk of Fame in Hollywood 60's architectural design style.

- Racing Coaster (a launched roller coaster manufactured by Premier Rides)
- Super Heroes 4D (a 4D simulator featuring Marvel characters)
- Broadcast Museum
- Dunlop Trans Car Racing
- Indosat Galaxy Vertigo (a Power Surge manufactured by Zamperla)
- Trans City Theatre
- Giant Swing (a pendulum ride)
- Si Bolang Adventure (A dark ride themed around an Indonesian kids TV program)
- Science Center
- Dunia Anak (an underground kids area with mostly carnival games)
- Pemburu Badai (a 40m S&S Double Shoot added in August 2018, relocated from Loudoun Castle)
- CNN Indonesia

=== Lost City ===
The Lost City section has features several rides, such as simulating a rescue of the Trans TV crews in their expedition to the jungle along the safari track.

- Jelajah
- Kong Climb
- Sky Pirates
- Amphitheater

=== Magic Corner ===
The Magic Corner is a fantasy themed area containing 6 attractions.

- Negeri Raksasa
- Black Heart's Pirate Ship
- Dragon Raiders
- Pulau Liliput
- Dunia Lain
- Special Effect Action Show

== Incident ==
The amphitheatre at Trans Studio Bandung reportedly caught fire on Tuesday, 14 October 2014. Fortunately, the blaze was contained within 15 minutes. The General Manager for Marketing Communication of the Trans Studio Bandung Integrated Area, Grandy Prajayakti, stated that the likely cause was the ignition of flammable material within the theme park.
