= Trans Studio Makassar =

Indoor theme park in South Sulawesi, Indonesia

Trans Studio
- Interactive map of Trans Studio
- Location: Jl. Metro Tanjung Bunga, Makassar, South Sulawesi, Indonesia
- Coordinates: 5.159676°S 119.394243°E
- Status: Operating
- Opened: May 20, 2009
- Owner: PT. Trans Kalla
- Operating season: Year-round
- Area: 31.4 acres (12.7 ha)

Attractions
- Total: 21 rides
- Website: transstudiomakassar.com

Trans Studio is the world's third-largest indoor theme park (as of 2009), located in Makassar, South Sulawesi, Indonesia. The 20,000-square-metre (220,000 sq ft), 20-metre (66 ft) high building houses the indoor theme park. Trans Studio is built on 12.7 ha (31 acres) with investment up to IDR 1 trillion (approximately USD 104 million). The indoor theme park was inaugurated by the Vice President of Indonesia, Jusuf Kalla, on September 9, 2009 (09-09-09). Trans Studio itself is a part of The Trans Studio World project, which will include Trans Walk and Rodeo Drive, Trans Studio, Trans hotels, and offices of Mega Bank. Under the management of PT. Trans Kalla, the development project will provide an integrated development, comprising not only an indoor theme park, but also shopping mall, supermarket, hotel, office area, recreational beach area, and residential area. The whole project was scheduled to be completed sometime in 2010.

== Background ==
Trans Studio is located on the main road of Metro Tanjung Bunga Street, Makassar. The 2.7-hectare (6.7-acre) indoor theme park consists four zones with 22 features and rides, which can hold 5,000 people. Trans Studio is developed under the management of PT. Trans Kalla, a partnership between Para Group and Kalla Group. Chairul Tanjung, the founder and the owner of Para Group, owns Bank Mega and television broadcasting company, Trans Corp. Trans Corp operates the private television stations TransTv and TV7 and is the first television station ever to own an indoor theme park. On the other hand, Kalla Groups is owned by Jusuf Kalla, former Vice President of Indonesia. Together, Chairul Tanjung and Jusuf Kalla created PT. Trans Kalla in 2007. Para Group is responsible for funding and constructing the entire facility, while Kalla Group is responsible for providing the land. Para Group holds 55 percent of the share and Kalla Group holds 45 percent.

== Design ==
Trans Studio Theme Park was conceptually designed by the Goddard Group, a Los Angeles–based entertainment firm responsible for many attractions at Universal Studios and Six Flags. The project was overseen by Gary Goddard (CEO), Barry Kemper (Producer), and Taylor Jeffs (Creative Director). Contributing designers include Christian Hope, Mick Reinman, Bob Baranick, Brent Kato, Phil Mendez, and Kohei Nakajima. The park's graphic identity was designed by Lee Roe.

== Trans Studio World ==
Trans Studio World is a Mega Development project under the management of PT. Trans Kalla. The project includes Trans Studio (largest indoor theme park as of 2009), Trans Walk and Rodeo Drive, Trans Hotel, residential area, recreational beach area, and office area. This giant project takes investment more than IDR 3 trillions (approximately USD 312 million), and one-third of the investment goes to Trans Studio. Exactly 50 percent of the fund for Trans Studio World project comes from bank loan from BRI and the rest is from loan from other banks, stock share holder, and the company's internal cash. The Director of Trans Studio Management, Wibowo Iman Sumantri, has confirmed the expense of Trans Studio that has reached IDR 1 trillion (USD 104 million). On the other hand, Budiman Wijaya, the director of Trans Kalla Management, confirms that the cost of the rides themselves already exceeds IDR 300 million (USD 30,000). Yet, the management is still optimistic that this project will bring fortune to them.

In the beginning of the project, the indoor theme park was planned to be only 2.4 hectares wide; however, the feasibility study and survey showed further growth. The Trans Kalla management later decided to extend the area from 2.4 hectares to 2.7 hectares. With the extended size of Trans Studio, the target of visitors had also been increased from 1.6 million to 2 million during the first year. The South Sulawesi provincial administration and the Makassar municipality expects the theme park would be able to stimulate economic growth, especially in Makassar.

The first step of the construction was to build Trans Studio and Trans Walk at the same time on 110,000 m^{2} land. The management expected a soft opening of Trans Studio in April 2009; however, they could not complete both Trans Studio and Trans Walk as planned. Therefore, Trans Studio was inaugurated in advance. Meanwhile, the grand opening started on May 20, 2009. Trans Hotel and Residential area with access to the beach will be the next facility to be built. The Trans Studio Walk and the rest of the project was forecasted to be completed in June 2010. Trans Studio has the largest parking area in South East Asia that can hold more than 2,700 vehicles.

In addition to this whole giant project, PT. Trans Kalla is expecting to do similar projects in Balikpapan, Bandung, and Jakarta.

== Location ==
Questions surface regarding the fact that the project is constructed in Makassar, the capital city of South Sulawesi, instead of Jakarta, the capital city of Indonesia itself. There are factors which make Makassar a high potential area for the attraction. Makassar is one of the biggest cities in Indonesia, with a population of over a million people. Despite the population, there are still a lot of high potential areas to build and develop in Makassar, unlike the overcrowded Jakarta. In addition, the economic growth in Makassar is considered high; its 9% gross domestic product (GDP) surpasses the average of gross national product (GNP) that is 7%. Another reason is that South Sulawesi is the main gateway to eastern Indonesia, which hold potential to economic prospects for the next five to six years, during which Trans Kalla would have already reached the breaking-even point (return in construction and development cost).

Trans Kalla management expects by choosing Makassar for Trans Studio location, they will be able to reach and embrace an international market. The existence in the tourism area, that are close to elite residential and business territory benefits Makassar. Since Trans Studio World is located close to the residential area of the middle and the upper class, as well as the business area in the independent city, Tanjung Bunga, makes Trans Studio World a highly potential market. The Strait Makassar coast in the north and west of the location is another beneficial attraction that will become part of the concept of the whole development.

Besides economic considerations, the reason behind the establishment of Trans Studio Theme Park in Makassar is because Kalla Group is the one who provided the land (Jusuf Kalla was born and raised in Makassar).

== Attractions ==
As a part of the entertainment, Trans Studio will provide the first mono train in Indonesia. The theme park consists of 22 features and amusement rides including Central Studio, Lost City, Magic Corner, Tsunami Island and Cartoon City. Many of the rides in Trans Studio are adopted from TransTV's and Trans7's shows such as Dunia Lain, Si Bolang, Jelajah, Ayun Ombak, and Angin Beliung; yet, some of them are adopted from Universal Studios and Disneyland in the United States. The rides also contain space simulation program of several television stations such as Trans TV, Trans 7, and other events in Indonesia. One ride is "Dunia Lain", which in English is "Another World". It is an Indonesian style haunted house with different kinds of Indonesian ghosts such as pontianak and jelangkung.

Visitors can experience the feeling of a celebrity in front of the camera or to be the crew of a television show. Moreover, there is a Studio Central, a theater with 1960s theme, providing the visitors the world of Hollywood; the zone reveals tricks and secrets behind the scenes of iconic movies.

- Trans City Theater
- Studio Tour
- Grand Esia Studio View
- Hollywood Bumper Car
- Sepeda Terbang (Flying Bicycle)
- Rimba Express
- Si Bolang
- Safari Track
- Balloon House
- Karosel (carousel)
- Ayun Ombak
- Angin Beliung
- Kano Kali (river canoe)
- Mini Boom Boom Car
- Putar Petir
- Bioskop 4D (4D Theater)
- Kids Studio
- Magic Thunder Coaster
- Dragon's Tower
- Jelajah
- Dunia Lain (another world/haunted house)

== Related Theme park ==
- Trans Studio Bandung
- Trans Studio Cibubur
