= Mary Jane =

Mary Jane, Mary-Jane or Mary Jayne is a double given name that may refer to:

== People ==
- Mary Jane Adams (1840–1902), Irish-born American writer and philanthropist
- Mary Jane Aldrich (1833–1909), American temperance reformer, lecturer, and essayist
- Mary Jane Alvero (born 1970), Filipino engineer
- Mary Jane Auch, American author and illustrator of children's books
- Mary Jane Barker (1953–1957), American missing girl who died of starvation
- Mary Jane Bode (1926–1998), American politician and journalist
- Mary Jane Bowes, American Supreme Court judge
- Mary Jane Bowie (born 1948), Canadian luger
- Mary Jane Brabazon, Countess of Meath (1847–1918), British philanthropist
- Mary Jane Briscoe (1819–1903), American founder of the Daughters of the Republic of Texas
- Mary Jane Brown (1895–1976), American academic and World War II nurse
- Mary Jane Cain (1844–1929), Australian community leader
- Mary Jane Carr (1895–1988), American author
- Mary Jane Clark (born 1954), American author
- Mary Jane Clarke (1862–1910), British suffragette
- Mary Jane Coggeshall (1836–1911), American suffragist
- Mary Jane DeZurik (1917–1981), American country musician
- Mary Jane Dockeray (1927–2020), American environmental educator and museum curator
- Mary Jane Dunphe, American musician
- Mary Jane Evans (1888–1922), Welsh teacher, preacher, and actress
- Mary Jane Farell (1920–2015), American bridge player
- Mary Jane Fate (1933—2020), Koyukon Athabascan activist
- Mary Jane Kekulani Fayerweather (1842–1930) Hawaiian priestess, musician, teacher, and rancher
- Mary Jane Fonder (1945—2018), American murderer
- Mary Jane Frehse, real name of Jane Frazee (1915–1985), American actress, singer, and dancer
- Mary Jane Garcia (1936–2024), American politician
- Mary Jane Godwin (1768–1841), English author, publisher, and bookseller
- Mary Jane Goodson Carlisle (1835—1905), acting First Lady of the United States during the term of Chester Arthur and the first year of Grover Cleveland
- Mary Jane Green, Confederate spy and bushwhacker
- Mary Jane Guck (1963–2024), Filipino actress commonly known as Jaclyn Jose
- Mary Jane Guthrie (1895–1975), American zoologist and cytologist
- Mary Jane Haake (born 1951), American tattoo artist
- Mary Jane Hancock (1810–1896), English artist and naturalist
- Mary Jane Hayden (1830–1918), American pioneer
- Mary Jane Hayes, birth name of Allison Hayes (1930–1977), American film- and television actress and model
- Mary Jane Higby (1909–1986), American actress
- Mary Jane Holmes (1825–1907), American author
- Mary Jane Holmes Shipley Drake (1841–1925), American slave
- Mary Jane Irving (1913–1983), American actress
- Mary Jane Irwin, American computer scientist and professor emerita
- Mary Jane Jacob, American curator, writer, and educator
- Mary Jane Katzmann (1828–1890), Canadian writer, editor, historian, and poet
- Mary Jane Keeney (1898–1969), American librarian
- Mary Jane Kelly (1863–1888), Irish victim of Jack the Ripper
- Mary Jane Kinnaird (1816–1888), English philanthropist
- Mary Jane Kirby (born 1989), Canadian rugby union player
- Mary Jane Lamond (born 1960), Canadian Celtic folk musician
- Mary Jane Latsis (1927–1997), American economic analyst
- Mary Jane Leach (born 1949), American composer
- Mary Jane Lewis, several people
- Mary Jane Long (1939–2018), American architect, lecturer, and author
- Mary Jane Longstaff (1855–1935), British malacologist
- Mary Jane Maffini, Canadian mystery writer
- Mary-Jane "Marie" Malvar, American 18-year-old murder victim
- Mary Jane Manigault (1913–2010), American sweetgrass basket maker
- Mary Jane Marcasiano, American fashion- and costume designer, film producer, and social entrepreneur
- Mary Jane McCaffree (1911–2018), American White House Social Secretary during the Eisenhower administration
- Mary Jane McCallum (born 1952), Canadian dentist and politician
- Mary Jane Megquier (1813–1899), American businesswoman
- Mary Jane Morgan (1823–1885), American schoolteacher and art collector
- Mary Jane Nealon, American poet and nurse
- Mary Jane Odell (1923–2010), American journalist, lecturer, and politician
- Mary Jane O'Donovan Rossa (1845–1916), Irish poet and political activist
- Mary Jane O'Reilly (born 1950), New Zealand dancer and choreographer
- Mary Jane Osborn (1927–2019), American biochemist
- Mary Jane Owen (1929—2019), disability rights activist, philosopher, policy expert, and writer
- Mary Jane Patterson (1840–1894), American educator
- Mary Jane Peale (1827–1902), American painter
- Mary Jane Perry, American oceanographer
- Mary Jane Phillips-Matz (1926–2013), American biographer
- Mary Jane Queen (1914–2007), American ballad singer and banjo player
- Mary Jane Rathbun, several people
- Mary Jane Reoch (1945–1993), American cyclist
- Mary Jane Richards (1843–1904), British theatre actress
- Mary Jane Richardson Jones (c. 1819–1909), American abolitionist, philanthropist, and suffragist
- Mary-Jane Rivers (born 1951), New Zealand community development leader
- Mary Jane Ross (1827–1908), Cherokee writer
- Mary Jane Rotheram-Borus (born 1949), American psychologist and professor
- Mary-Jane Rubenstein (born 1977), American scholar of religion, philosophy, science studies, and gender studies
- Mary Jane Russell (1926–2003), American photographic fashion model
- Mary J. Safford (1834–1891), American nurse, physician, educator, and humanitarian
- Mary Jane Saunders, American academic
- Mary Jane Seacole (1805–1881), British-Jamaican nurse, healer, and businesswoman
- Mary Jane Seaman (1837?–1888), English actress
- Mary Jane Sherfey (1918–1983), American psychiatrist and writer on female sexuality
- MaryJane Shimsky (born 1960), American politician
- Mary Jane Shultz (born 1948), American professor and researcher
- Mary Jane Simes (1807–1872), American portrait painter
- Mary Jane Simmons (1953–2004), American politician
- Mary Jane Skalski, American film producer
- Mary Jane Spurlin (1883–1970), American judge
- Mary Jane Theis (born 1949), American Supreme Court justice
- Mary Jane Truman (1889–1978), younger sister of Harry S. Truman
- Mary Jane Tumbridge (born 1964), Bermudian equestrian
- Mary Jane Veloso (born 1985), Filipina woman convicted in Indonesia of drug trafficking
- Mary Jane Wallner (born 1946), American politician
- Mary Jane Ward (1905–1981), American novelist
- Mary Jane Warfield Clay (1815–1900), American socialite, suffragist, abolitionist, and political activist
- Mary Jane Warnes (1877–1959), Australian activist
- Mary Jane Watkins (dentist) (1902–1977), American actress and dentist
- Mary Jane Hale Welles (1817–1886), American letter writer, wife of Gideon Welles
- Mary Jane West-Eberhard (born 1941), American theoretical biologist
- Mary Jane Wilson (1840–1916), Indian-born English Roman Catholic nun
- Mary Jane Windle (1825–?), American short-story writer and journalist
- Mary Jane Young, Canadian folk singer

== Arts and entertainment ==
=== Fictional characters ===
- Mary Jane Watson, a love interest of Spider-Man (Marvel Comics)
- Mary Jane, in Looney Tunes and Merrie Melodies Comics
- Mary Jane, in the 60 Seconds! game
- Mary Jane, in the 2002 film Scooby-Doo

=== Music ===
- The Mary Janes, a 1990s Irish band formed by Mic Christopher, et al
- "Mary Jane (All Night Long)", a 1995 song by Mary J. Blige
- "Mary Jane" (Janis Joplin song), a song performed by Janis Joplin
- "Mary Jane" (Megadeth song), a 1988 song on Megadeth's album So Far, So Good... So What!
- "Mary Jane" (Rick James song), a 1978 song on Rick James' album Come Get It!
- "Mary Jane", song from Scarface's album The Untouchable
- "Mary Jane", a song by The Miracle Workers
- "Mary Jane", a song on Luke Tan's album The Suicide King
- "Mary Jane", a song on Alanis Morissette's album Jagged Little Pill
- "Mary Jane", a song on DE/VISION album Devolution
- "Mary Jane", a song on IllScarlett's EPdemic and Clearly in Another Fine Mess
- "Mary Jane", a song on The Click Five's album Modern Minds and Pastimes
- "Mary Jane", a song on the Happy Birthday solo album by Pete Townshend of The Who
- "Mary Jane", a song on Spin Doctors' album Turn It Upside Down
- "Mary Jane", a song on the Technohead album Headsex
- "Mary Jane", a song on The Vines' album Highly Evolved
- "Mary Jane", a song on Davido's album Omo Baba Olowo
- "Mary Jane", a 2009 song by Tori Amos from her album Abnormally Attracted to Sin
- "Mary Jane", a 2018 song by Radio and Weasel of Goodlyfe Crew
- "Mary Jane", a 2026 song by MUNA from their album Dancing on the Wall

=== Other uses in arts and entertainment ===
- "Mary Jane", a poem by Patti Smith from her 1972 book Seventh Heaven
- Mary + Jane, an MTV television series
- Maryjane (film), 1968 film starring Fabian
- Mary Jane (play), a play by Amy Herzog

== Other uses ==
- Mary Jane (candy), a brand name of confectionery formerly manufactured by NECCO
- Mary Jane shoes
- Mary Jane (slang), a slang term for cannabis
- Mary Jane Ski Resort, part of the Winter Park Resort in Grand County, Colorado

== See also ==
- Mary Jane Girls, a 1980s R&B group
- Mary Jayne Gold (1909–1997), American heiress who helped European Jews and intellectuals escape Nazi Germany in 1940-1941
- Mary Jayne Harrelson (born 1978), American middle distance runner
