= Windle =

Windle may refer to:

Companies

- Windle (sidecar)

Places

- Windle, St Helens, Merseyside, England

People

- Sir Bertram Windle (1858–1929), British scientist
- Bob Windle (born 1944), Australian swimmer
- Janice Woods Windle (born 1938), American author
- Jeanette Windle (fl. 2000s–2010s), American writer
- Jordan Windle (born 2003), Cambodian born American diver
- Mary Jane Windle (1825–?), American short story writer and journalist
- Matt Windle (born 1990), English professional boxer and poet
- Tom Windle (born c. 1999), English footballer
- William Windle, American politician from Pennsylvania
- William F. Windle (1898–1985), American anatomist and experimental neurologist

== See also ==
- Windley (disambiguation)
