= Windley (disambiguation) =

Windley may refer to:

- Windley, a village in Derbyshire, England
- Windley Key, Florida
- Windley Key Fossil Reef Geological State Park, Florida
- Windley River, New Zealand
- Windley (surname)

== See also ==
- Windle (disambiguation)
