= Women in the California gold rush =

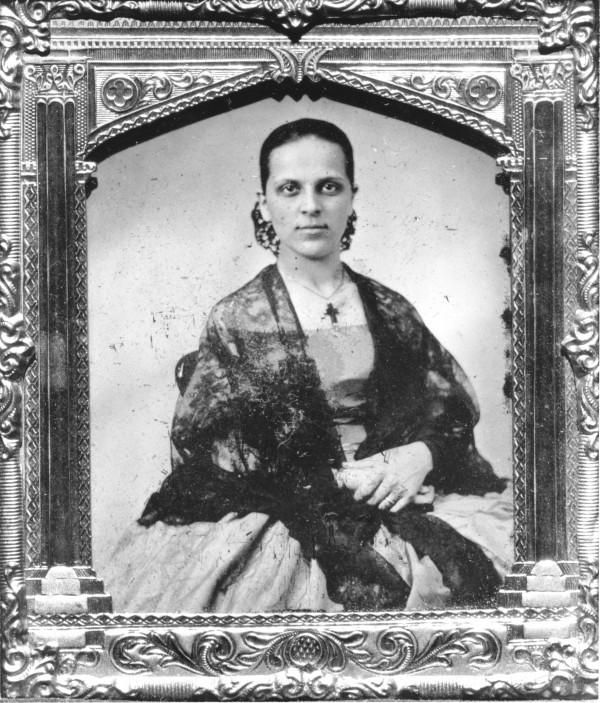
Gold Rush era Portrait of a Californio woman of Hispanic descent

Women in the California gold rush initially included Indigenous women and those of Spanish descent, known as Californios, who already resided in California. As news of the gold rush spread, women worldwide soon migrated to California with their families or for financial prospects. Throughout the Gold Rush, scarcely any women immigrated to California compared to men; the gender imbalance peaked in 1850 in California’s White population, with an estimated 12.2 men for every woman. This gender imbalance was consistent in every racial and ethnic group. Women of many different continents, statuses, classes, and races participated in the California Gold Rush, with the majority being Anglo-Americans, Europeans, Latinos, and Chinese.

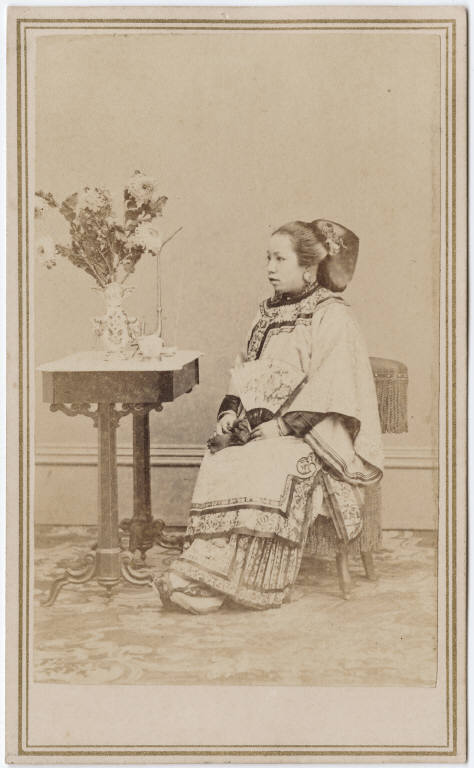
Carte de Visite photograph of a Chinese woman, California

During the Gold Rush, women migrants headed to California traveled on one of the only two routes: overland on wagon trains known as the California Trail or by ship through the Cape Horn Route or Panama Shortcut. Many American women’s diaries and letters reveal that a majority of women were pressured to travel to California to stay with their husbands and families. As travel arrangements improved and miners gained more wealth, many men with few options for female company in California turned homeward for companionship. Some men sent their wives or other women money for their passage to join them in California. Simultaneously, the Gold Rush experience and economic and social conditions attracted prostitutes worldwide, as well as the importation of women for the flesh trade. In San Francisco, the documentation of Chinese girls as slave imports was common, as hundreds of girls would be brought to the ports to be inspected and sold at auctions to brothel owners regularly.

The fast-increasing but imbalanced population led to a myriad of opportunities for women, as California’s male-dominated society resulted in a significant demand and importance for feminized service industries, especially cooks, housekeepers, seamstresses, laundresses, and prostitutes. Aside from a small population of women who mined alongside their husbands or other male miners, many women made their fortunes as entrepreneurs, prostitutes, or entertainers, as desperate and lonely men willingly spent enormous sums of money for female company or to simply buy goods and products made by women. The scarcity of women increased their economic value and impacted their social value associated with marriage and motherhood. Women’s agency significantly increased with their legal power to divorce their partner, as women had primary power in choosing men who were more attractive or richer, ensuring their comfort and lifestyle.

Typically, women euphemistically labeled as entertainers had little or no money for passage. However, as soon as they showed up in California, they were hired by various saloons, gambling halls, dance halls, peep shows, and/or brothels. Despite the cosmopolitan nature of California society at the time of the Gold Rush, women’s race and class played a central part in their placement within California’s stratified population. A majority of the state's population consisted of white males, but a majority of prostitutes were poor and young women of color. Women of color not only faced exploitation in the sex industry, being paid the least, but also faced a high risk of sexual violence.

The gender imbalance in California (indeed in most of the West) would persist for several generations, inevitably shaping the future population of California.

== Number of Women ==
California Population (in thousands)
Year	Population	Male	Female
1840^{1}	8	4	4
1850^{2}	120	110	10
1852^{3}	200	180	20
1860	380	273	107
1870	560	349	211
1880	865	518	347
1890	1,213	703	511
1900	1,485	821	665
1910	2,378	1,323	1,055
1920	3,431	1,814	1,613
1930	5,677	2,943	2,735
1940	6,907	3,516	3,392
1950	10,586	5,296	5,291
1960	20,163	9,827	10,336
1970	20,203	9,817	10,386
1) Californios found in 1850 U.S. Census
2) 1850 Census Adjusted for missing data
3) 1852 California State Census
California Historical U. S. Census Data

The 1850 U.S. California census, the first census that included all non-Native Americans, showed only about 7,019 females with 4,165 non-Indian females older than 15 in the state. To this, about 10 million women older than 15 years old from San Francisco, Santa Clara, and Contra Costa counties should be added, whose censuses were lost and not included in the totals. This gives about 5,500 females older than 15 years old in a total California non-Native American population of about 120,000 residents in 1850 or about 4.5% female. The number of women in the mining communities and mining camps can be estimated by subtracting the roughly 2,000 females who lived in predominantly Californio (Hispanics born in California before 1848) communities and were not part of the gold rush community. About 3.0% of the gold rush Argonauts before 1850 were female, or about 3,500 female Gold Rushers, compared to about 115,000 male California Gold Rushers.

By California's 1852 state census, the population had increased to about 200,000 of which about 10% or 20,000 are female. Competition by 1852 had decreased the steam ship fare via Panama to about $200 and the Panama Railroad (completed 1855) was already working its way across the Isthmus making it ever easier to get to California.

By the 1860 U.S. federal census, California had a population of 330,000 with 223,000 males and 107,000 females—still a male to female ratio greater than 2 males to 1 female. By 1870, the population had increased to 560,000, with 349,000 males and 211,000 females, or a ratio of 100 males to 38 females. Equilibrium female-male number parity would take until the 1950 census with a total population of 10,586,000; 5,296,000 males compared to 5,291,000 females.

=== Early Arrivals ===
Women of all different statuses, classes, and races were involved in the California Gold Rush. The rapidly increasing California population had very few women, and women found a myriad of different opportunities that were normally not available to them. As word of the gold rush spread, so did the word of opportunities for women to work in the gold fields and communities. Some of the first women to show up were women from southern California, Sonora, Chihuahua, Acapulco, and San Blas. Since the women were predominantly Sonoran, they were typically labeled 'Sonorans' or 'Senoritas' by the miners. They were soon joined by women from Panama, Ecuador, Peru, and Chile. Since Chileans predominated the South American population, Latinos were typically called 'Chilenos'. As word got back to the East Coast about the job opportunities for women, travel arrangements were worked out with paddle wheel steam ship lines with dependable schedules on the Caribbean and Pacific Ocean, and many more women started coming to California.

== Native American women ==
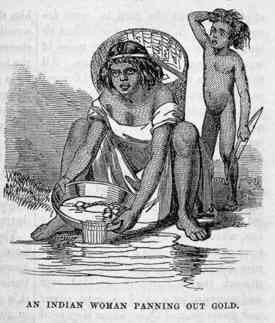
Gold Rush-era Native American woman panning

Although gold had no exchange value in many Indigenous cultures, the Indigenous people of California quickly recognized that gold could be exchanged for valuable goods with the newly arriving immigrants. However, it did not take long for immigrants to resort to violence, oppression, and exploitation towards Indigenous miners and Native American populations in general. In one instance, Native American miners were first exploited for labor in the southern districts by Charles M. Weber as he employed Indigenous men, women, and children to pan for gold, as women were tasked with washing and extracting gold from mud collected in grass baskets by men.

The large influx of people into California devastated all indigenous communities, regardless of whether they participated in the Gold Rush or not. Indigenous land was rapidly appropriated by imposing immigrants and miners searching for new gold deposits. This resulted in the dwindling of many indigenous traditional food supplies and pollution of their land and water. Soon, Indigenous communities faced widespread death through diseases and starvation as incoming miners saw these communities as threats to their future mining prosperity and prospects. Native American’s extermination, relocation and enslavement became common California policy as Indigenous women predominately became targets of rape, massacre, or were kidnapped and sold into slavery, along with their children.

Sexual violence, starvation, and Indian Wars constituted the lives of California’s Indigenous women. Through the Gold Rush, as Native American communities faced increasing dispossession and impoverishment, Indigenous prostitution grew, as women had no other options to provide for their starving families. Indigenous women were viewed as the most racially inferior and were subsequently paid the least for their prostitution, while some women were punished or killed by their own communities as prostitution was viewed as adultery. Many Indigenous women contracted syphilis from their prostitution work. Subsequently, this disease further impacted Indigenous people's steadily declining birth rates.

To worsen matters, Indigenous women faced legal discrimination as the state legislature passed California Statute Chapter 133, called “An Act for the Government and Protection of Indians,” in 1850. Specifically, section 6 prohibited the conviction of a white person solely based on a Native American testimony. Hence, White men kidnaped, raped, and murdered Indigenous women with no fear of legal retribution or punishment throughout the Gold Rush Era. California also passed a law that allowed Whites to enslave Natives who were found orphaned or 'loitering'. The enslavement of Native Americans had already been established by the Spaniards and Californios who preceded the Gold Rush. After the gold rush, bounties were offered for "Indian hunters" who could prove they had killed a Native American by bringing in a body part. The Native American population of California fell from 150,000 in 1848, when gold was discovered, to 30,000 in 1870. Some Natives were able to escape extermination by passing as Mexicans. Stories of massacres, forced relocation, and kidnappings have been passed down through the generations, often by women, and are still remembered by California Native people today.

== Women in sex work and entertainment ==
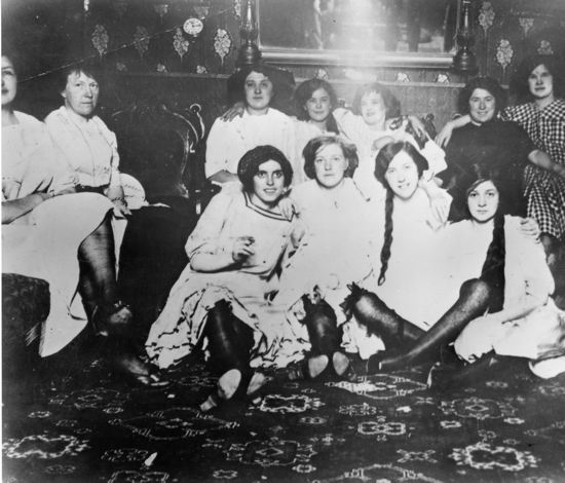
Women in an early San Francisco bordello

Many women picked up on entertainment as a means of making money during a time of racial discrimination and expectations that limited the independence of many woman. Women flooded to California from several countries and cities to work as sex workers and entertainers to capitalize on the scarcity of women. Most had worked as sex workers or entertainers in some other city before going to California. They worked in saloons, gambling halls, dance halls, peep shows or brothels, and some set up their own businesses. Many came to marry a prosperous miner or businessman and leave the business. Many of them did. Others became mistresses to high rolling customers who could afford to keep them in the style they desired. In the early 1850s, women were so scarce that sex workers were not typically viewed by most as immoral, and many were in fact highly desired and their company actively sought. Initially there were virtually no laws prohibiting or trying to regulate or control sex work, and a handful of madams became so prosperous and powerful they helped keep local police, doctors, theater managers, politicians and liquor salesmen in business. The often flamboyant fashion styles set by many sex workers were copied by other women.

Most of the women who worked in the saloons, gambling halls, dance halls and/or brothels were labeled "entertainers". Typically these entertainers had little or no money for passage but as soon as they showed up they were hired by various saloons, gambling halls, dance halls and/or brothels who paid for the cost of their trip. The women typically repaid the cost of passage by agreeing to work for the payees at least three to six months. In women-starved California men paid up to $16.00 to $20.00 a night for the privilege of having them sit at the same gaming table with them.

Young Chinese girls were bought in China and sold as Chinese sex workers, often referred to as "Volcano Girls", for Chinese men and were considered to be the bottom of the sex worker hierarchy. They were always far fewer than the male Chinese population with only seven Chinese sex workers known in 1850. Hispanic women –then better known as "Chilean" women despite being not only from Chile but also from Mexico and Peru – typically were considered one rung up in desirability. In late 1849, French sex workers got a head start as about 200 of them showed up in San Francisco. Other French sex workers showed up from French settlements in Lima Peru and Santiago Chile. White American and French sex workers were considered the most desirable and charged the highest prices. Many French sex workers, for example, became very wealthy since they were actively sought at the saloons, gaming tables, dance halls, peep shows, etc. and as escorts to prosperous miners and business men. Typically, the lighter complexion a woman had, the higher price she could ask. Sex work occurred in organized brothels, individually rented rooms, and in saloons, gaming halls, or fandangos—which offered dancing, gambling, alcohol, and sometimes sex workers. Increasing populations of miners' and business men's wives and their families helped further stigmatize sex work when middle-class morality began to come to California in the late 1850s.

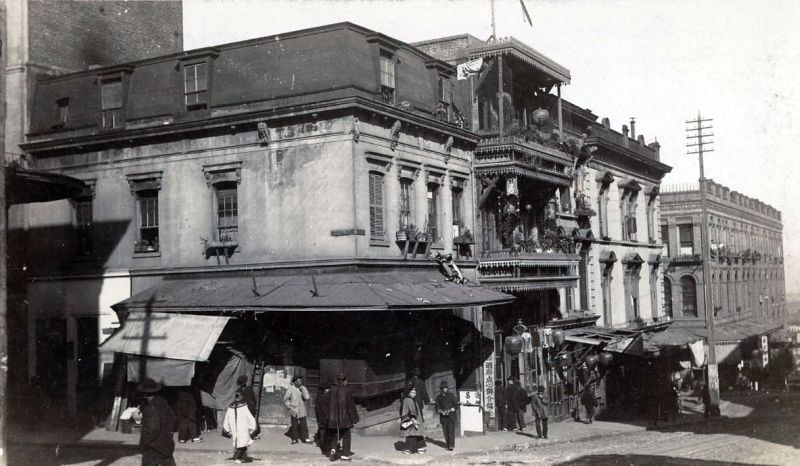
Belle Cora's house of prostitution and gambling in San Francisco, 1853

In 1850, San Francisco had 537 registered saloons. There was little opportunity to do anything except visit the saloons—very little else existed. California sex workers suffered from a litany of problems common to sex workers then and now. Unwanted pregnancy was a distinct possibility since there were no commonly available contraceptive drugs or devices. The choices with an unwanted pregnancy were back-room abortion or giving birth and raising an illegitimate child of often-uncertain parentage. Disease was a constant problem, since syphilis was common among a lot of men and women. If discovered in time, there were treatments for syphilis but it was costly and painful. Other diseases, like cholera, measles, tuberculosis, diphtheria, were constant threats as knowledge of how they were spread or how to treat them was unknown. Germs would remain unknown for another 30 years and evasive to effective treatment for over a century in many cases. City Sanitation practices were expensive and not understood as clean water and sewage collection and treatment were just starting to develop. Epidemics like cholera and yellow fever killed thousands. Medical treatments were of very uneven quality as almost anyone could call themselves a doctor and treat patients—professional medical training and certification was just starting to be developed. Medical knowledge was so poor that training often did little or no good.

To make more money, the women were often paid to "push" drinks on their customers and if successful they often ended up inebriated. Sometimes they were allowed to drink tea which only looked like the expensive drinks their companions were paying for. Drug, alcohol, or gambling addiction was a common problem as some women tried to escape into another world. Often, sex workers were managed by pimps who collected a large share of their earnings. Drunk customers were a continuous problem. Many men were dirty and wore dirty clothes. Bathing involved a strenuous process of heating water on a wood stove, dumping it in a tub, washing down and then dumping the dirty water. Not everyone believed in being clean, and baths were infrequent for many. Eventually, bath houses developed where bathing could be done for a fee. Clothes were hard to wash and iron and there are several stories of dirty laundry being sent to Hawaii to be cleaned and ironed and then returned— it was cheaper than doing it locally.

Some of California's sex workers were indentured Chinese women, economically and socially oppressed Latina women, or kidnapped and enslaved White women. From 1848 to the late 1850s, sex workers experienced an unprecedented decline in power and a rapid fall from grace as more "respectable" women and their families came to California. Many sex workers were illiterate and signed contracts with dubious legality with an "X". As the number of sex workers multiplied, their rates went down and it became harder to make a living. As sex work became illegal, it was often necessary to bribe the local police to continue to operate.

Some women, like Ah Toy and Belle Cora gained power and wealth in the early San Francisco Gold Rush days by becoming successful madams and operating brothels. Toy, allegedly the first Chinese sex worker in San Francisco, opened a string of brothels and used the San Francisco court system to protect herself and her businesses. Cora, a clergyman's daughter, operated a brothel in San Francisco that "offered the handsomest and most skillful girls, at the highest prices, of any bagnio in the city."

== Other Forms of Women's Work ==
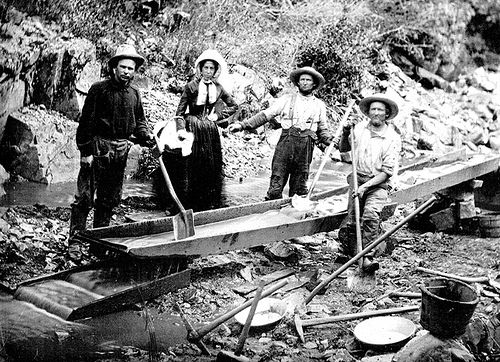
A woman with three men panning for gold during the California gold rush

A few women came to California with their husbands and children and often helped pan for gold or earn cash while their husbands tried their luck panning for gold. Others came directly on their own to mine for gold. One Mexican woman was said to have brought several workers to the mines to pan gold for her; another made over $2,000 in forty-six days of mining. Marie Suize was a gold miner and businesswoman from France who was arrested three times for wearing pants. One of the most popular ways for a woman to earn a living was to run a boarding house; the memoirist Mary Ballou was one example. Another was cooking or running a restaurant. California was about the only place that women could earn wages higher than men for equivalent work because women were scarce, and the men would pay just to be in their company and have them do household tasks the men did not want or know how to do. One enterprising woman earned $18,000 baking pies.

Washing clothes was another occupation women engaged in. Originally, most of the washerwomen were Native or Mexican women. When White men saw how lucrative the profession could be, they also joined in. A pond in San Francisco called "Washerwoman's Bay" became a popular spot for women doing laundry to congregate, and a meeting was held by laundry workers in 1850 to discuss fees being charged and organize into a society. By 1853, however, Chinese male immigrants had supplanted women in the laundry business.

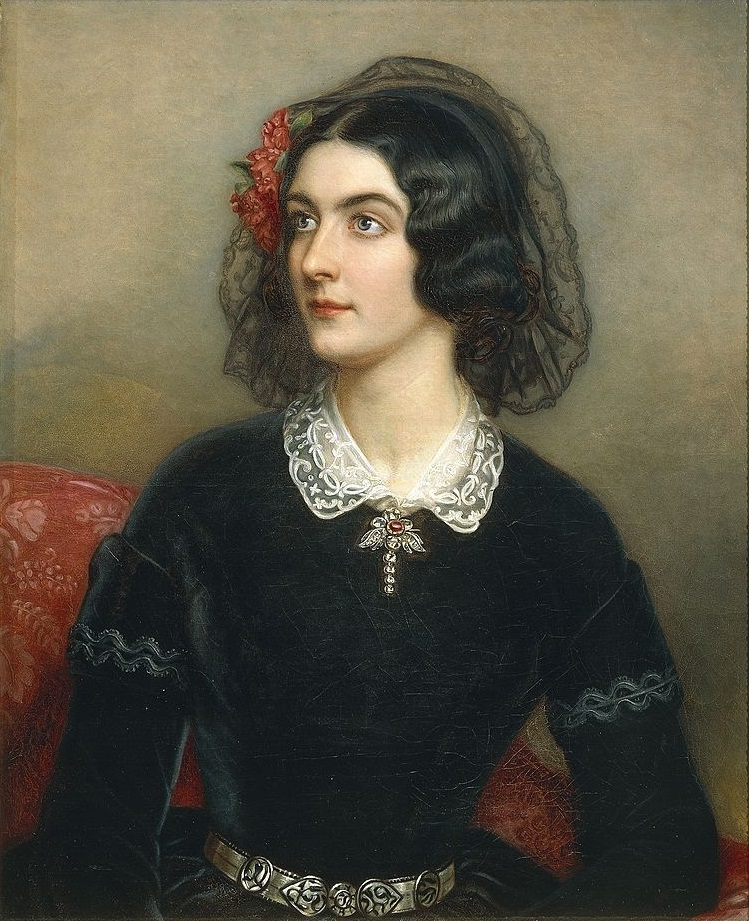
Portrait of Lola Montez by Joseph Karl Stieler, 1847. The Irish entertainer who took the name "Lola Montez" and arrived in Northern California in 1853

Some women and girls, like Lola Montez and Lotta Crabtree, found success in dancing and acting. Lola Montez, a dancer and entertainer who was already famous in Europe, arrived in San Francisco in May 1853. She quickly grew popular from her performances, especially her famous "Spider Dance", which was performed to tarantella music. In this dance, she would portray a woman attempting to remove spiders that were crawling beneath her clothing. Her unusual and quite dramatic performances made her a popular attraction among San Francisco Gold Rush Audiences. Lotta Crabtree started performing in California's mining communities as a child, where she entertained miners through singing and dancing. After meeting Lola Montez in Grass Valley, Montez encouraged her dancing and singing. Crabtree later performing in San Francisco's theaters and vaudeville houses, creating a reputation for her energetic performances and comedic talent. She has included banjo playing in her acts. As her popularity grew, she became of the highest-paid performers on the American stage. Her career showed how entertainment could provide women with opportunities to earn money and achieve financial independence during and after the Gold Rush.

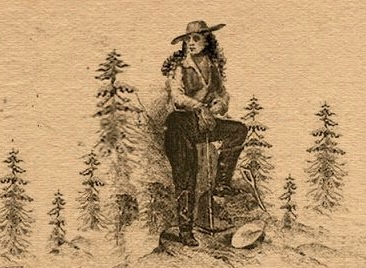
Goldminer and winemaker Marie Suize Pantalon was arrested several times for wearing pants

Most single women came as part of a family group or as entertainers. Many men did not find their fortunes in the gold fields, and having a woman around to earn money with boarding, washing, cooking, sewing, etc., could mean the difference between the family living well and not. A few women had their gold mining claims and came out west with the specific intention of panning for gold. As the easy-to-find placer gold became scarcer and mining became more complex, women typically moved out of the gold fields and into some other type of work. Most women had many marriage proposals and could get married almost as soon as they found someone they liked.

For some women, the gold rush opened up economic and career opportunities they did not have back home. Julia Shannon and Julia Randolph became well-known professional studio photographers, a new field that was relatively easy for women to enter, though it was still dominated by men. Eleanor Dumont, or Madame Moustache, as she was sometimes known, earned her living as a card shark, moving from town to town, and eventually opened up her own gambling parlor. Entrepreneur Mary Ellen Pleasant, who called herself a "capitalist", used the vast wealth she accumulated to free slaves through the Underground Railroad. Other women worked as barbers, nurses, schoolteachers, mule packers, and circus performers. Charlotte Parkhurst dressed as a man and drove a stagecoach. One woman managed a theater; another ran a bowling alley. One woman writes of seeing a "lady bullfighter."

In the mines in the Sierra Nevada, where there were fewer White women, Mexican and Chilean women gained importance as increased competition caused them to leave the larger towns and cities and go to the smaller gold mining camps. This opportunity for upward economic gain was easier for non-White women than for non-White men.

Mexican and Californio women also played an important role in the California Gold Rush economy, particularly through selling food and providing domestic services. In mining towns such as Sonora, women prepared and sold tortillas, tamales, beans, and other meals to miners. Other women operated outdoor cooking areas and sold food to the growing mining population, Mexican women worked as laundresses, providing their services to the community. These opportunities did not mean they were treated equally. A historical study by the California Department of Transportation notes that Mexican women in Calaveras County earned less than white women for equal work, and often received disrespect.

Some women wrote letters home, diaries, or newspaper articles describing their experiences during the Gold Rush, which were collected and published by later historians to offer insight into their journeys West and life at that time. One of the more notable works is The Shirley Letters, by Louise Amelia Knapp Smith Clappe. Other writers include Luzena Wilson, Mary Jane Megquier, Sallie Hester, and Eliza Farnham. Jennie Carter wrote for the African American California newspaper The Elevator during the 1860s and 1870s.

== Marriage ==
The scarcity of women in the California Gold Rush skewed the marriage market in their favor. While parental approval and economic concerns still occasionally played a role in engagements, they decreased in importance. Mixed marriages, while still stigmatized, were more common in California due to the diverse pool of women, in which White women were a small minority. Women also found it easier to get a divorce in California than elsewhere, as the judges seemed to want to increase the number of women in the marriageable "pool". As divorcées, these women did not receive the negative public scrutiny sometimes evident elsewhere because divorce was often part of the new Californian culture. Eligible women usually had several proposals for marriage in a short time.

Starting in the mid-1850s, people began to settle into their traditional roles, with economic classes and abandoning non-traditional gender roles. Many lone men sent for their families, and middle-class American morality re-emerged as the number of middle-class wives and families increased. It is estimated that about 30% of the male miners were married men who had left their families to try their luck in California. Many men returned to their homes, but many others transferred their families to California and stayed. The influx of more White women, who were seen as symbols of purity and morality in the typical Victorian view, often changed the accepted morality and mores. In some communities with large populations of non-White immigrants, some non-White male groups were assigned formerly "feminine" roles (e.g., the Chinese laundry and cooks).

== Josefa (Juanita) ==
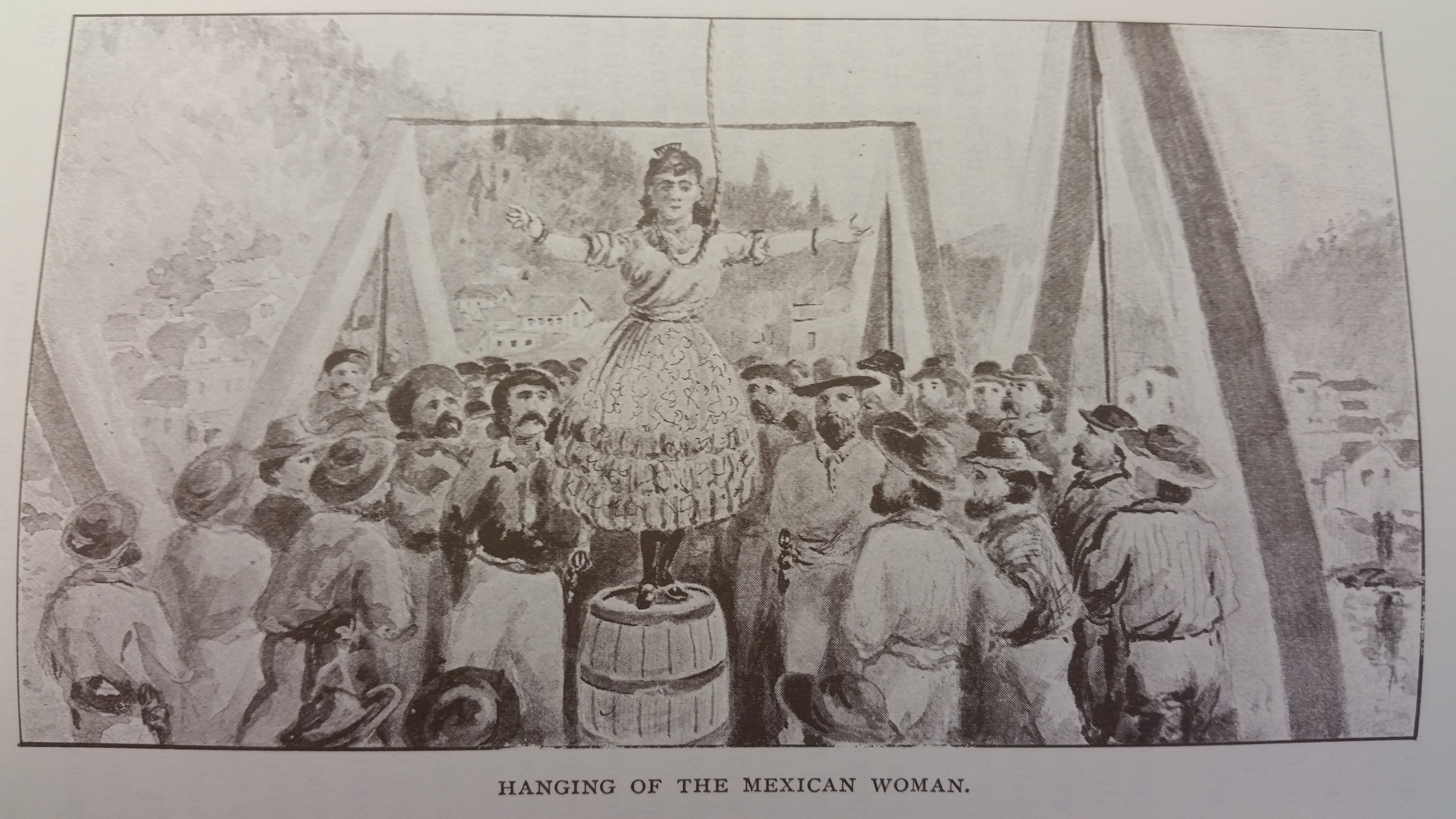
Art presentation of the lynching of Josefa

Josefa (also referred to as Juanita) was a Mexican woman who lived in the Northern California mining town of Downieville with her husband, José. On July 4, 1851, after Fourth of July celebrations, an Anglo-American miner, Frederick Cannon, and his friends stumbled upon Josefa's home. The intoxicated group knocked down Josefa's door and stumbled into the house, with only Josefa inside. The next day, Frederick returned to their home and argued with José over the broken door. Josefa joined the argument and Frederick called her a whore among other slurs. Josefa went inside her home as Frederick followed behind. Once inside, Josefa stabbed Frederick, reportedly in fear that he would harm her or her husband. The couple was taken into custody, and an angry lynch mob sentenced Josefa to death. Josefa was hanged by the lynch mob while José was run out of town. Josefa was not regretful of her actions as she stated before her death, "I would do the same again if I was so provoked".

The death of Josefa was significant to the Gold Rush, as she was the first Mexican woman to be lynched in California and the only woman to be lynched during the Gold Rush. The story of Josefa is often altered as Euro-American historical works attempt to downplay her death and claim the lynching as a justified response to the labeled "heroic death" of Frederick. Josefa is often referred to as "Juanita", even though there is no historical evidence to support this name change. The lynching of Josefa is an example of Mexican women being sexualized and demonized by white men, as described in the 1851 Daily Alta California publication. The newspaper described Josefa as an "outraged Spanish woman" while finally feminizing her at the end with the description of Josefa moving her "Raven black hair" for the cord. The publication of the story was delayed because of its credibility from the editors, even though the reporters were at the trial. The story of Josefa highlights the high levels of discrimination and violence against women of color during the California Gold Rush.

== Property Rights ==
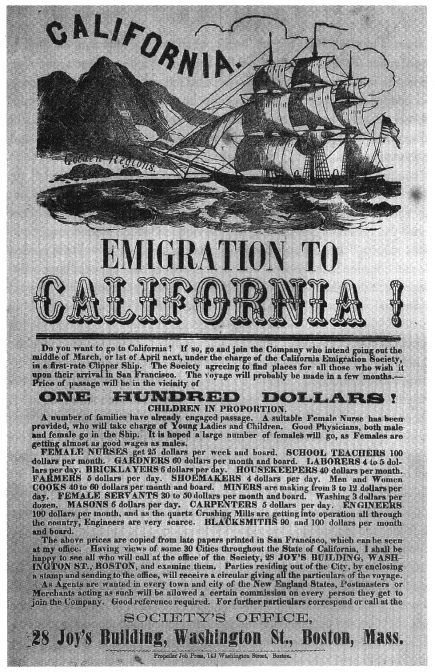
A flyer advertising for men and women to come to California during the Gold Rush lists a variety of jobs available there.

Delegates at the 1849 California Constitutional Convention considered and adopted California's first constitution. It provided that "All property, both real and personal, of the wife, owned or claimed by her before marriage, and that acquired afterwards by gift, devise, or descent, would remain her separate property". Delegates advanced various arguments in favor of the provision, including that it reflected the existing law of California as well as that of other states. The language of the proposal was taken nearly word for word from the Texas constitution, reflecting the civil law tradition there and in other states historically under the sway of French- or Spanish-based legal systems. The English-based common law under which many American jurisdictions operated then, women upon marriage had little or no property rights beyond provisions for one-third of the household goods and land in the event of death of the husband.

There were arguments both for and against this provision. A delegate recently arrived from New York warned against granting women separate property rights, based on his experiences in France. There, he argued, such rights promote "the spectacle of domestic disunion.... There the husband and wife are partners in business, raising the wife from head clerk to partner. The very principle is contrary to nature and contrary to the married state." One delegate who supported the provision declared, "We are told, Mr. Chairman, that woman is a frail being; that she is formed by nature to obey, and ought to be protected by her husband, who is her natural protector. That is true, sir; but is there any thing in all this to impair her right of property which she possessed previous to entering into the marriage contract? I contend not." Another argued that it would empower women and attract them to the state, where marriageable Anglo-American women were scarce: "Having some hopes that I may be wedded...I shall advocate this section in the Constitution, and I will call upon all the bachelors in this convention to vote for it. I do not think that we can offer a greater inducement for women of fortune to come to California. It is the very best provision to get us wives that we can introduce into the Constitution."

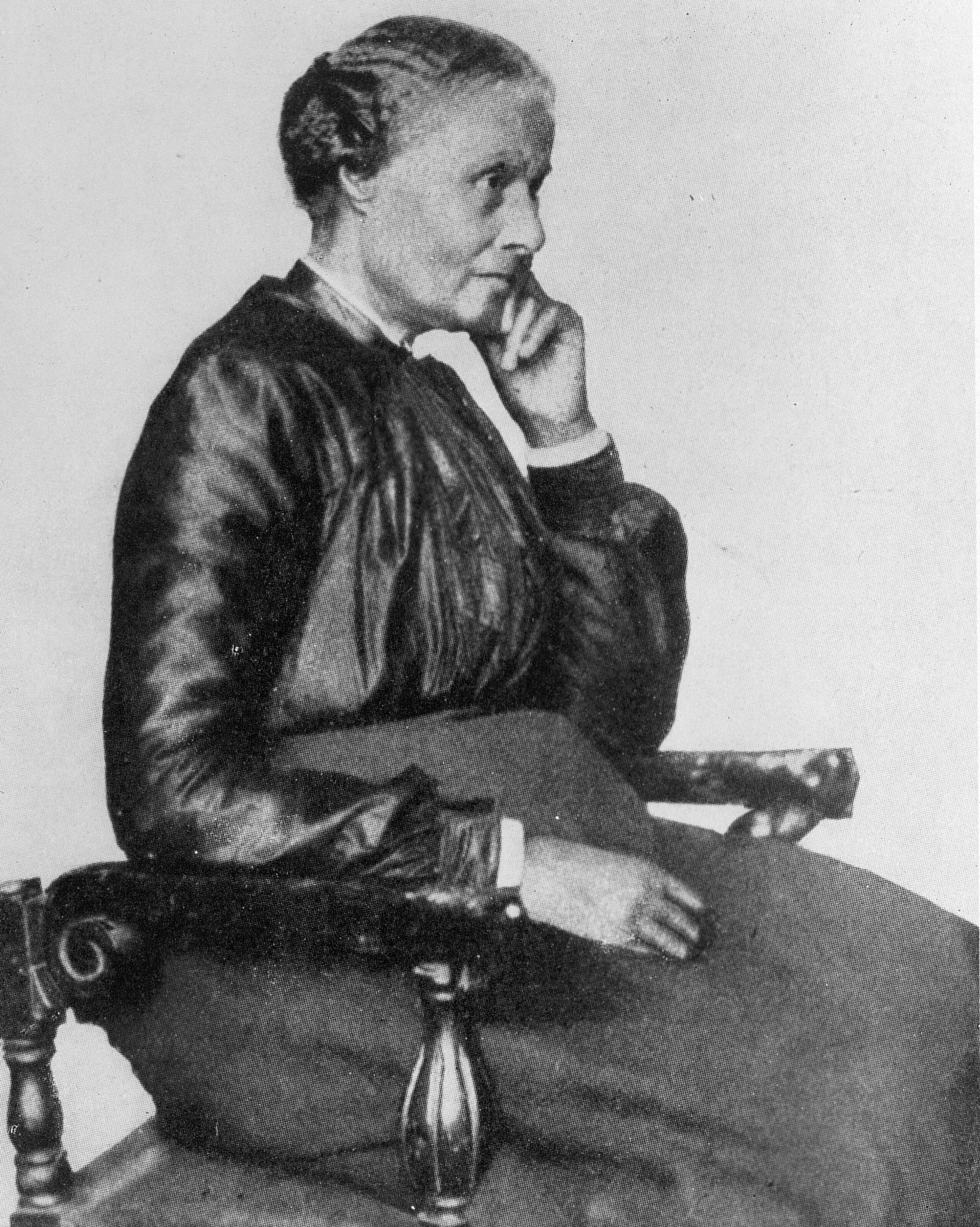
Entrepreneur and real estate magnate Mary Ellen Pleasant used the money and influence she earned during the Gold Rush to free slaves on the Underground Railroad

While interpretations of the constitutional provision varied, according to scholar Donna C. Schuele, "A consensus emerged whereby the constitutional guarantee of married women's property rights was viewed as a progressive enactment boldly distinguishing the Golden State from eastern jurisdictions struggling to emerge from the grips of antiquated notions of law and patriarchy." In 1850, however, the California State Legislature enacted property laws that expressly undermined certain aspects of the constitutional guarantee. In particular, one statute provided that the husband had management and control even of the wife's separate property, although he could not sell or encumber the property without the wife's consent made in writing and confirmed outside the presence of the husband. California also adopted community property laws when it became a state, giving each spouse a right to half of whatever was acquired during the marriage.

== Sources ==
- Browne, J. Ross (1850), The Debates in the Convention of California on the Formation of the State Constitution in September and October, 1849, Washington: John T. Tower, pp. 257–269
- Statutes of California Passed at the First Session of the Legislature Begun the 15th Day of Dec. 1849 and ended the 22d Day of April, 1850, at the City of Pueblo de San Jose., San Jose: J. Winchester, State Printer, 1850
- Trafzer, Clifford E.; Hyer, Joel R. (1999-01-31), Exterminate Them: Written Accounts of the Murder, Rape, and Enslavement of Native Americans during the California Gold Rush, East Lansing: Michigan State University Press, ISBN 978-0-87013-501-9
- Hurtado, Albert L. (1988), Indian Survival on the California Frontier, New Haven, CT: Yale University Press, ISBN 978-0-300-04147-7
- Hurtado, Albert L. (1999), Intimate Frontiers: Sex, Gender, and Culture in Old California, Albuquerque: University of New Mexico Press, ISBN 978-0-8263-1954-8.
- Hurtado, Albert L. (1 February 1999b). "Sex, Gender, Culture, and a Great Event: The California Gold Rush". Pacific Historical Review. 68 (1): 1–19. doi:10.2307/3641867. ISSN 0030-8684.
- Johnson, Susan Lee (2000), Roaring Camp: The Social World of the California Gold Rush, New York: Norton, ISBN 978-0-393-04812-4
- Levy, Jo Ann (1990), They Saw the Elephant: Women in the California Gold Rush, Hamden, CT: Archon, ISBN 978-0-208-02273-8.
- Moynihan, Ruth B.; Armitage, Susan; Fischer Dichamp, Christiane, eds. (1990), So Much to Be Done: Women Settlers on the Mining and Ranching Frontier, Lincoln: University of Nebraska Press, ISBN 978-0-8032-3134-4
- Schuele, Donna C. (2003), ""None Could Deny the Eloquence of This Lady": Women, Law, and Government in California, 1850-1890", in Burns, John F.; Orsi, Richard J. (eds.), Taming the Elephant: Politics, Government, and Law in Pioneer California, Berkeley: University of California Press, pp. 169–174, ISBN 978-0-520-23413-0
- Taniguchi, Nancy J. (2000), "Weaving a Different World: Women and the California Gold Rush", in Starr, Kevin; Orsi, Richard J. (eds.), Rooted in Barbarous Soil: People, Culture, and Community in Gold Rush California, Berkeley: University of California Press, pp. 141–168, ISBN 978-0-520-22496-4.
- Dame Shirley, Marlene Smith-Baranzini, The Shirley Letters from the California Mines, 1851-1852, Heyday, 185.
