= Margaret Jane =

Margaret Jane is a feminine double given name. Notable people with the name include:

- Margaret Jane Benson (1859–1936), English botanist
- Margaret Jane Blye (1942–2016), American actress
- Margaret Jane Briggs (1892–1961), New Zealand show‑ring rider
- Margaret Jane Gordon (1880–1962), Welsh singer with a career in Australia
- Margaret Jane Joachim (born 1949), British politician
- Margaret Jane Mussey Sweat (1823–1908), American author, patron and reformer
- Margaret Jane "Dee Dee" Myers (born 1961), American political analyst
- Margaret Jane Pittman (1901–1995), American bacteriologist
- Margaret Jane Radin (born 1941), American legal scholar
- Margaret Jane Scott Hawthorne (1869–1958), New Zealand tailor, trade unionist and factory inspector
- Margaret Jane Spear (fl. 1940s), American politician in Massachusetts
- Margaret Jane Wray (1962–2025), American dramatic soprano

== Other uses ==
- FV Margaret Jane, a Canadian stern trawler that sunk in 1980 following a collision at sea

== See also ==
- Margaret
- Mary Jane
