= Adamson University =

Roman Catholic university in Manila, Philippines

- Pamantasang Adamson (Filipino)
- Former names: Adamson School of Industrial Chemistry (1932–1936); Adamson School of Industrial Chemistry and Engineering (1936–1941)
- Motto: Veritas in Caritate (Latin)
- Motto in English: Truth in Charity
- Type: Private research non-stock non-profit basic and higher education institution
- Established: June 20, 1932; 94 years ago
- Founder: George Lucas Adamson
- Religious affiliation: Roman Catholic (Vincentian)
Academic affiliations
ASAIHL ACUP; CEAP COCOPEA FAAP	IAU; IFCU PAASCU PACU PACUCOA SMIIC
- President: Fr. Daniel Franklin Pilario, CM
- Vice-president: List: Fr. Rafael Eloriaga, CM (VP for Financial Affairs); Fr. Andrew Bayal, CM (VP for Student Affairs); Dr. Rosula S.J. Reyes (VP for Academic Affairs); Venusmar C. Quevedo (VP for Administrative Affairs)
- Principal: Ms. Geraldine P. Pancho (Grade School and Jr. High School); Dr. Nea A. Sualog (Senior High School)
- Faculty: 500
- Students: 17, 768 (S.Y. 2021-2022)
- Location: 900 San Marcelino St., Ermita, Manila, Metro Manila, Philippines; 14°35′10″N 120°59′10″E
- Campus: Urban 10.7 hectares (107,000 m^{2})
- Patron saint: Vincent de Paul
- Alma Mater song: Adamson Hymn
- Colors: Blue White
- Sporting affiliations: UAAP PBL PVL; Filoil EcoOil Preseason Cup
- Mascot: Soaring Falcon
- Website: www.adamson.edu.ph
- Location in Manila Location in Metro Manila Location in Luzon Location in the Philippines

Adamson University (Filipino: Pamantasang Adamson; AdU or ADU) is a private Catholic university operated by the Congregation of the Mission located in Manila, Philippines. The university has academic programs in graduate school, law, the liberal arts, sciences, engineering, nursing, pharmacy, architecture, business administration, and education, as well as secondary, elementary, and preschool. It is one of the universities in the country to receive an autonomous status by the Commission on Higher Education.

Logotype of Adamson University

Adamson is a member of the University Athletic Association of the Philippines. In its 80th season, the university won first place in the cheerdancing competition.

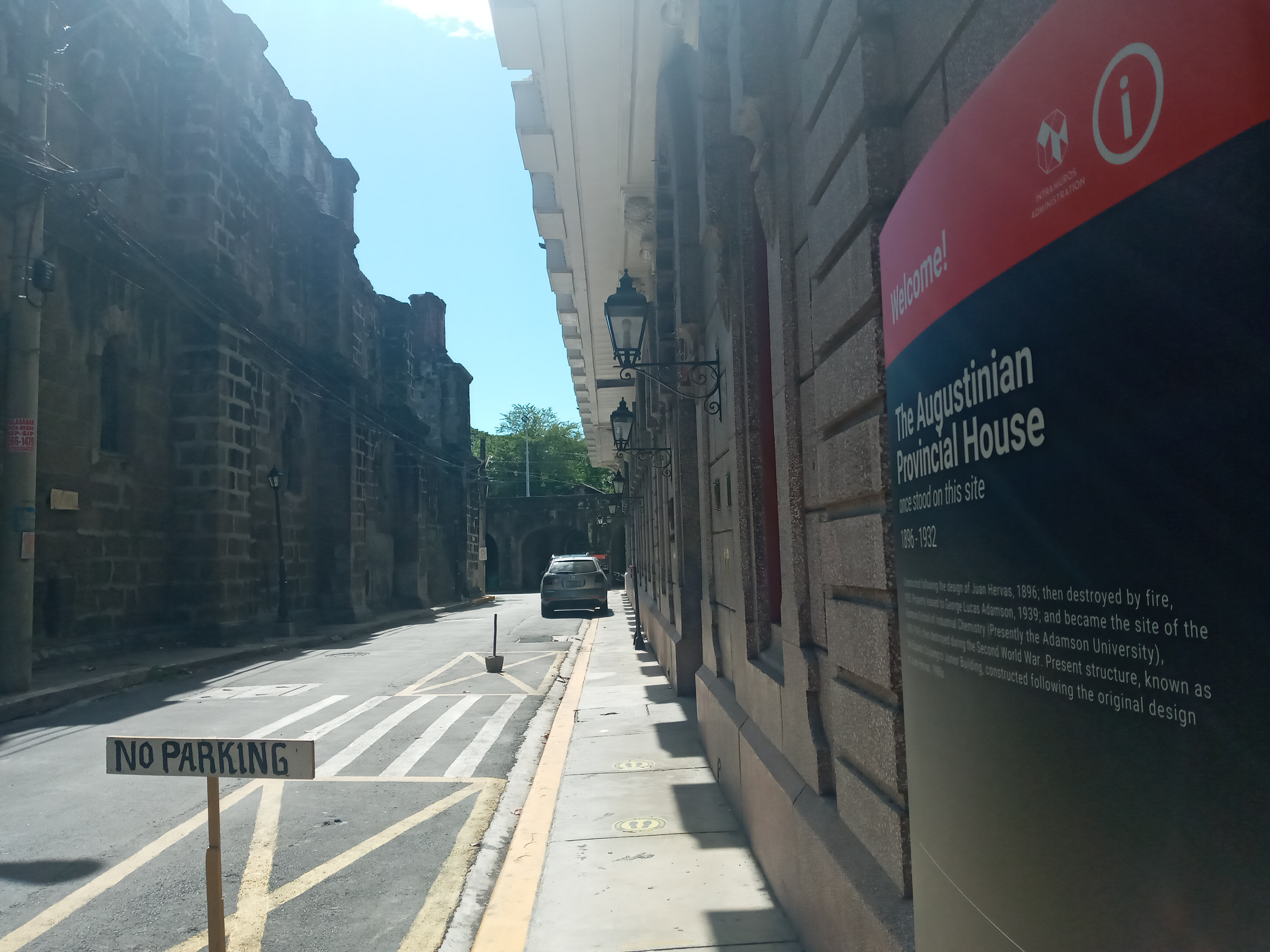
An Intramuros marker of the old Adamson School of Industrial Chemistry

== History ==
George Lucas Adamson, a Greek chemist, founded the Adamson School of Industrial Chemistry on June 20, 1932 as a single-classroom school for industrial chemistry. His cousin, Alexander Athos Adamson, came to the country in 1932 to assist him in administering the then-newly founded school, where he served as its vice president, treasurer, and registrar. Alexander's brother, George Athos Adamson, arrived two years after to serve as a professor and dean of both the school and the College of Engineering. On February 19, 1936, the school was renamed as the Adamson School of Industrial Chemistry and Engineering. In 1939, George Lucas' wife, Evdoxia Savaides Adamson, began working at the school, serving as a professor and eventually dean of both Colleges of Education and Liberal Arts and Sciences. She was soon followed by George Athos' wife, Sofia Adamson, who taught in the College of Education and briefly served as the Junior Normal College's Director. The school became university on February 5, 1941 upon the approval of the Department of Public Instruction.

The Adamsons worked at the university after the Second World War, except for George Athos and Sofia, who left the country after the war. George Lucas Adamson served as the university's president for 35 years. During his tenure, the university became a probationary member of the University Athletics Association of the Philippines in 1952; it was granted full membership in 1971. On December 4, 1964, the university was turned over to the Congregation of the Mission and was incorporated into the Adamson-Ozanam Education Institutions, Inc. Its patron saint is Saint Vincent de Paul.

Spanish priest Leandro I. Montañana became the university's second president, holding the office until 1985. He was succeeded by Fr. Rolando S. Dela Goza, C.M., the first Filipino president of the university. He held the office until 1994, where he was succeeded by Fr. Jimmy Belita, C.M. who served as president until 2003. Fr. Gregorio L. Bañaga, Jr., C.M. became the university's fifth president, a position he held until 2015.

The university celebrated its diamond jubilee in 2007. The National Historical Commission of the Philippines designated the university as a historical site. A memorial was installed in front of the St. Vincent Building, the oldest building on campus, commemorating this heritage.

Adamson University was granted autonomous status by the Commission on Higher Education in 2010, giving greater powers to the administration of the university independent to the commission.

On November 16, 2012, the university inaugurated a museum dedicated to its founders, inside the St. Vincent Building. The inauguration was part of the celebration of its 80th anniversary. In 2013, the university received an ISO 9001:2008 Management Systems certification from TÜV Rheinland. On 2015, Fr. Marcelo V. Manimtim, C.M. became the sixth president of the university, succeeding Bañaga.

On December 13, 2023, Fr. Manimtim stepped down as the president of the University, and Fr. Daniel Franklin E. Pilario, C.M., Ph.D., S.Th.D., became the 7th President and 3rd alumnus President of Adamson University.

== Campuses ==
=== Manila main campus ===
Main campus

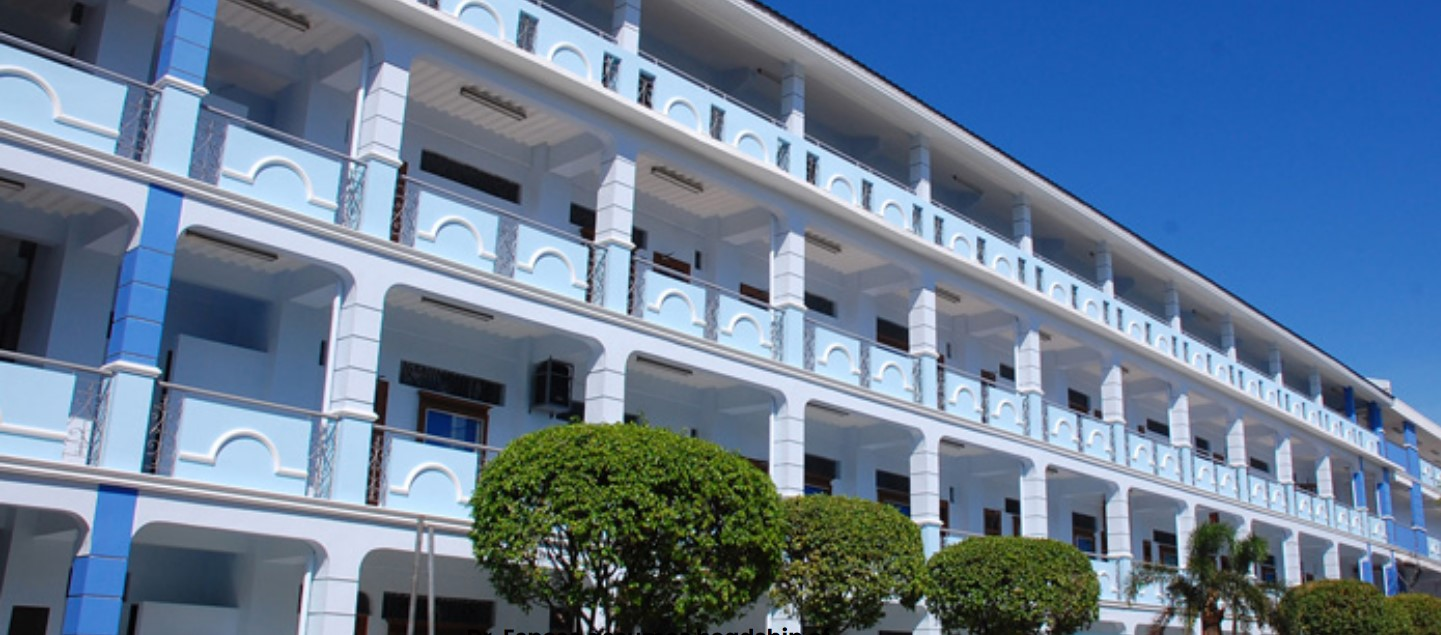
Francis Regis Clet Building

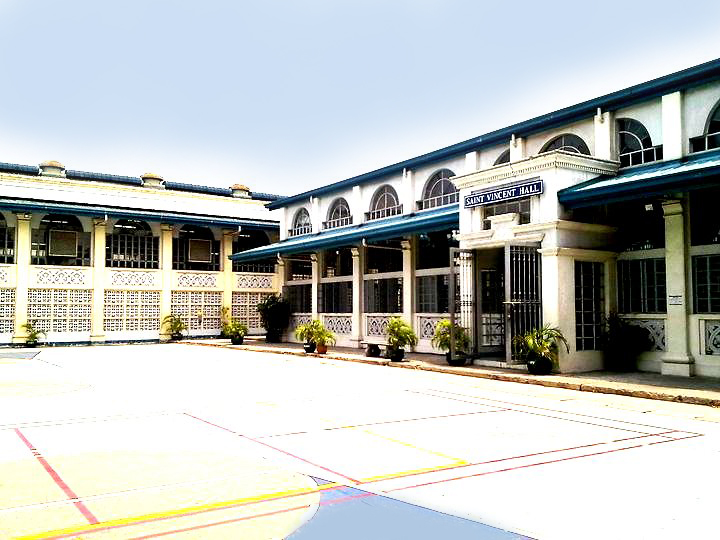
Saint Vincent Hall

Adamson University is located in San Marcelino Street, Ermita, Manila, in an area known colloquially as the "University Belt". The Technological University of the Philippines, Santa Isabel College Manila, Emilio Aguinaldo College, and Philippine Normal University are its nearest neighbors. Adamson University has eight buildings occupying 10.7 hectares of land.

The school was located in three different campuses: Santa Cruz (1932–1933), San Miguel (1933–1939), and Intramuros (1939-1941) before finally settling on its present location in 1946. The university expanded its campus in San Marcelino by acquiring the Meralco building in 1968 and the St. Theresa's College-Manila site just across the street in 1977.

=== Saint Vincent Seminary campus ===
St. Vincent School of Theology is the Graduate School of Theology of Adamson University (AdU). It offers degrees such as Doctor of Philosophy in Theology (Ph.D. in theology), Master of Arts in Theology (MA Theology), Masters in Pastoral Ministry (MPM) and Bachelor of Arts in Philosophy (AB Philosophy). The diploma non-degree courses are Philosophy for Theological Studies (PTS), Introductory Theological Formation (ITF) and Christian Theology for the Laity (Hapág-Layko Program). The campus is located inside the Sanctuario de San Vicente de Paul in Tandang Sora, Quezon City.

=== Future Dapitan campus ===
The City Government of Dapitan and Adamson University signed a memorandum of cooperation on September 13, 2023, to establish a new campus in the city, aimed at providing quality education to students in Mindanao; the announcement was posted by the Adamson Chronicle (Autonomous and Official Student Publication of the Adamson University) on their page on September 28, 2023.

== Reputation and Rankings ==
University rankings

Global – Overall
- QS World: 1001–1200 (2026)

Regional – Overall
- QS Asia: 411–420 (2025)

Globally, AdU was #1,001–1,200 in the QS World University Rankings 2026. It has solidified its #5 spot in the QS ranking of top universities in the Philippines for years.

== Alumni ==
=== Politics and governance ===
- Ruthlane Uy Asmundson, former mayor of Davis, California
- Cynthia Barker, Mayor of Hertsmere, a local government district and borough in Hertfordshire, England
- Eduardo del Rosario, Secretary of Department of Human Settlements and Urban Development
- Romulo Peña Jr., Representative of the First District of Makati
- Angelito Gatlabayan, former city mayor and representative of the 2nd District of Antipolo
- Jose Catindig Jr., former mayor or Santa Rosa, Laguna
- Roberto Uy, governor of Zamboanga del Norte
- Noel Rosal, former mayor of Legazpi, Albay
- Cesar B. Chavez, Secretary of Presidential Communications Office (PCO).

=== Sports ===
- Rafael "Paeng" Nepomuceno, World Champion bowler
- Carlos Yulo, 2019 World Artistic Gymnastics Championships gold medalist in floor exercise finals, 2024 Paris Olympics gold medalist in Men's Floor Exercise
- Kenneth Duremdes, basketball player, UNTV Cup Senate Defenders Head Coach,
- Marlou Aquino, basketball player
- Hector Calma, basketball player
- Ompong Segura, basketball player and coach
- Joy Dionisio, scored first basket in the PBA
- Louie Alas, Letran Knights coach
- Nandy Garcia, basketball player
- Edward Joseph Feihl, basketball player
- Gherome Ejercito, basketball player
- Eddie Laure, basketball player
- Alex Nuyles, basketball player
- Lester Alvarez, basketball player
- Ken Bono, basketball player
- Chad Alonzo, basketball player
- Melvin Mamaclay, basketball player
- Jericho Cruz, basketball player
- Rodney Brondial, basketball player
- Eric Camson, basketball player
- Don Trollano, holds the PBA's record for most consecutive three-point field goals made
- Jansen Rios, basketball player
- Sean Manganti, basketball player
- Jerrick Ahanmisi, basketball player
- Simon Camacho, basketball player
- Mylene Paat, Volleyball player, Philippine National Women's Volleyball Team Member
- Jema Galanza, volleyball player, Creamline Cool Smashers
- Tatan Pantone, volleyball player, PLDT Home Fibr Hitters
- Pau Soriano, volleyball player
- Louie Romero, volleyball player
- Trisha Genesis, volleyball player, Akari Chargers
- Dante Alinsunurin, champion volleyball coach
- Sherwin Meneses, champion volleyball coach
- Ana Santiago, 15-time champion softball coach in the UAAP
- Thang Ponce, volleyball player
- Angelica Alcantara, volleyball player
- Lorene Toring, volleyball player
- Keith Zaldivar, basketball player
- Jerom Lastimosa, basketball player
- Amanda Villanueva, volleyball player, model
- Ryan Monteclaro, basketball player, coach
- Joy Dacoron, volleyball player
- Ishie Lalongisip, volleyball player
- Lucille Almonte, volleyball player
- Mike Alinsunurin, volleyball player
- Mayang Nuique, volleyball player
- Chiara Permentilla, volleyball player
- Jed Colonia, basketball player and coach
- Cedrick Manzano, basketball player

=== Arts, culture, religion, and entertainment ===
- Prince Villanueva, actor
- Hazel Ann Mendoza, actress
- Nida Blanca, actress
- Francine Prieto, actress
- Jestoni Alarcon, actor
- Neil Coleta, actor
- Mario O'Hara, film director, film producer and screenwriter
- Guillermo Gómez Rivera, historian and writer
- Rene Alviar, journalist
- Daniel Franklin Pilario, priest, writer
- Fernando Suarez, priest
- Florentino Floro, judge

=== Science and research ===
- Mary Jane Alvero, CEO of Geoscience Testing Laboratory, United Arab Emirates
- Carmen Lamagna, university academic

=== Other ===
- Somchai Chaiyasut (died 1985) - A Thai police officer who was suspected of bombing Cathay Pacific Flight 700Z in 1972, and ruled not guilty in two trials.

== Publication ==
Presidents of Adamson University
George Lucas Adamson, 1932–1967
Leandro I. Montañana, 1967–1985
Rolando S. Dela Goza, 1985–1994
Jimmy A. Belita, 1994–2003
Gregorio L. Bañaga Jr., 2003–2015
Marcelo V. Manimtim, 2015-2023
Daniel Franklin E. Pilario, 2023–present

- The Adamson Chronicle
- The Sentinel Adamson University
- Spotlight Publication
- The Adamson News
