= USS Welles =

Two ships in the United States Navy have been named USS Welles for Gideon Welles.

- The first USS Welles (DD-257) was a Clemson-class destroyer, commissioned in 1919 and transferred to the Royal Navy in 1940 where she served as HMS Cameron (I05) until 1944.
- The second USS Welles (DD-628) was a Gleaves-class destroyer, commissioned in 1943 and decommissioned in 1946.
