= Mary Ballou =

Mary D. B. Ballou
- Born: 1809
- Died: 1894 (aged 84–85)
- Occupation: Boardinghouse proprietress
- Writing career
- Period: 1852
- Subjects: Letters and observations

Mary Ballou (1809–1894) was an American memoirist notable for her collection of letters I Hear the Hogs in My Kitchen. Written in 1852, they were published in 1962. Ballou's writing gave personal insight into the life of an American pioneer. With her husband, Ballou left her New Hampshire home for California, not in search of gold to be mined, but money to be made off those doing the mining. The Ballous ran a lucrative boarding house in Negro Bar, California. Her letters describe the antics of the miners she housed, as well as the unique experience of being a woman during the California Gold Rush. In addition to running a boarding house, she provided many services such as childcare, including nursing, making soap and sewing.

== See also ==
- Women in the California Gold Rush
