= Citizens Advice Bureau New Zealand =

New Zealand charitable organisation

- Ngā Pou Whakawhirinaki o Aotearoa
- Formation: 1970
- Type: Charitable organisation
- Registration no.: NZBN 9429042678694
- Purpose: Advice
- Headquarters: Wellington
- Methods: freephone, face-to-face, email, chat
- Budget: $2.5 m NZD (2023-2024)
- Volunteers: 2,500 (part-time)
- Website: www.cab.org.nz

Citizens Advice Bureau in New Zealand, known as CAB NZ and CAB, was established in 1970, replicating the British Citizens Advice charity. The Māori name, Nga Pou Whakawhirinaki o Aotearoa, reflects a place for seeking help, solace, and strength. The organisation's logo features a manaia motif symbolizing protection, unlike the British owl symbol, which holds negative connotations for some iwi.

Similar to the British charity, its twin aims are to “ensure that individuals do not suffer through ignorance of their rights and responsibilities” and “exert a responsible influence to the development of social policies and services”. CAB operates 80 branches nationwide with over 2000 volunteers.

== History ==
The first CEO of the CAB NZ was Mary-Jane Rivers.

== Advice work ==
Volunteers engage with clients through various channels, such as face-to-face, free phone, email, and chat, offering services like in-depth interviews, quick inquiries, and specialised clinics on legal, tenancy, budgeting, and more to support those in need.

An independent 2018 survey concluded that 11% of the general population and 13% of the low-income population turned to CAB for assistance when having legal issues.

== Funding ==
Each branch is affiliated nationally and managed locally. These not-for-profit charities rely on grants for funding. CABNZ is based in Wellington and funded by the government. The branches are funded and run locally, with backup from the national organisation. For instance, if a natural disaster strikes a particular area, the 0800 system will re-route call load from the affected area to other branches around the country. The national organisation maintains the website and its search algorithms.

In 2018 Wellington City Council only approved continued funding for the five CAB branches in Wellington after an independent service review was completed by PWC. The review found that the CAB delivered a 139 percent return on the investment made by the council.

In 2023, when the Auckland mayor proposed cutting Council funding to Auckland CABs, a petition signed by 20,000 people led to a change in plans.

In 2024 the Ministry of Social Development did not continue funding for the Budget Service run by the Wellington CAB resulting in a funding shortfall of $77,000

== Impact ==
A company that measures social value in dollar terms, found in 2022, that the North Shore branch social return on investment was $1:$13.20, in other words, every NZ$1 invested results in NZ$13.20 returned to New Zealand.

Volunteers create an anonymous record of each enquiry. This dataset is used to shape social policies. For example, in 2021, this dataset was used in a University of Otago project to find ways to mitigate the negative impacts of unresolved legal problems on people's everyday lives. The most common legal problems are consumer, employment, rented housing, wills, enduring power of attorney, and neighbour disputes.

Another key piece of work is an ongoing digital exclusion campaign. This uses the collected data to recognise that some people lack digital literacy, don't have access to the internet, or don't own a device, and looks at ways government departments and other organisations, such as banks, could be more inclusive and less pushing people to access everything online.

== See also ==
Citizens Advice outside the United Kingdom and Citizens Advice, the UK equivalent.
