= Marie Suize =

French gold miner and businesswoman (1824–1892)

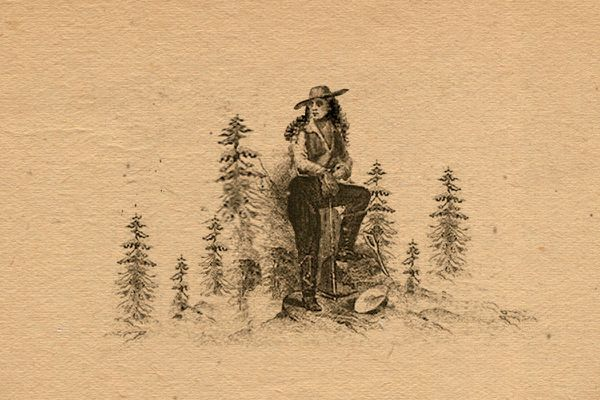
- Marie Suize Pantalon (19th century engraving)
- Born: July 14, 1824; Savoy, France
- Died: January 8, 1892 (aged 67); Amador County, California, United States

Marie Suize (July 14, 1824 – January 8, 1892), also known as Marie Pantalon and Marie Pantaloon, was a French gold miner and businesswoman who came to California during the Gold Rush. She earned her name because of her insistence on wearing pants, even though she was arrested several times for it.

== Early life ==
Marie Suize was born on July 14, 1824, in the Savoy region of France. She was the seventh child - and second daughter - of a family of twelve boys and five girls. Her father was Claude Suize, originally from La Clusaz, owner of the Hôtel de la Russie de Thônes, and her mother was Marie Adélaïde Machet. Like many people in that impoverished region, she moved to Paris at age 22 to try to better her life. There, she worked odd jobs as a housekeeper. She fell into poverty and was rescued by a Parisian woman, who gave her a place to stay and helped her get a job with a Parisian newspaper. While working at the paper, she found out about the discovery of gold in California.

== In search of gold ==
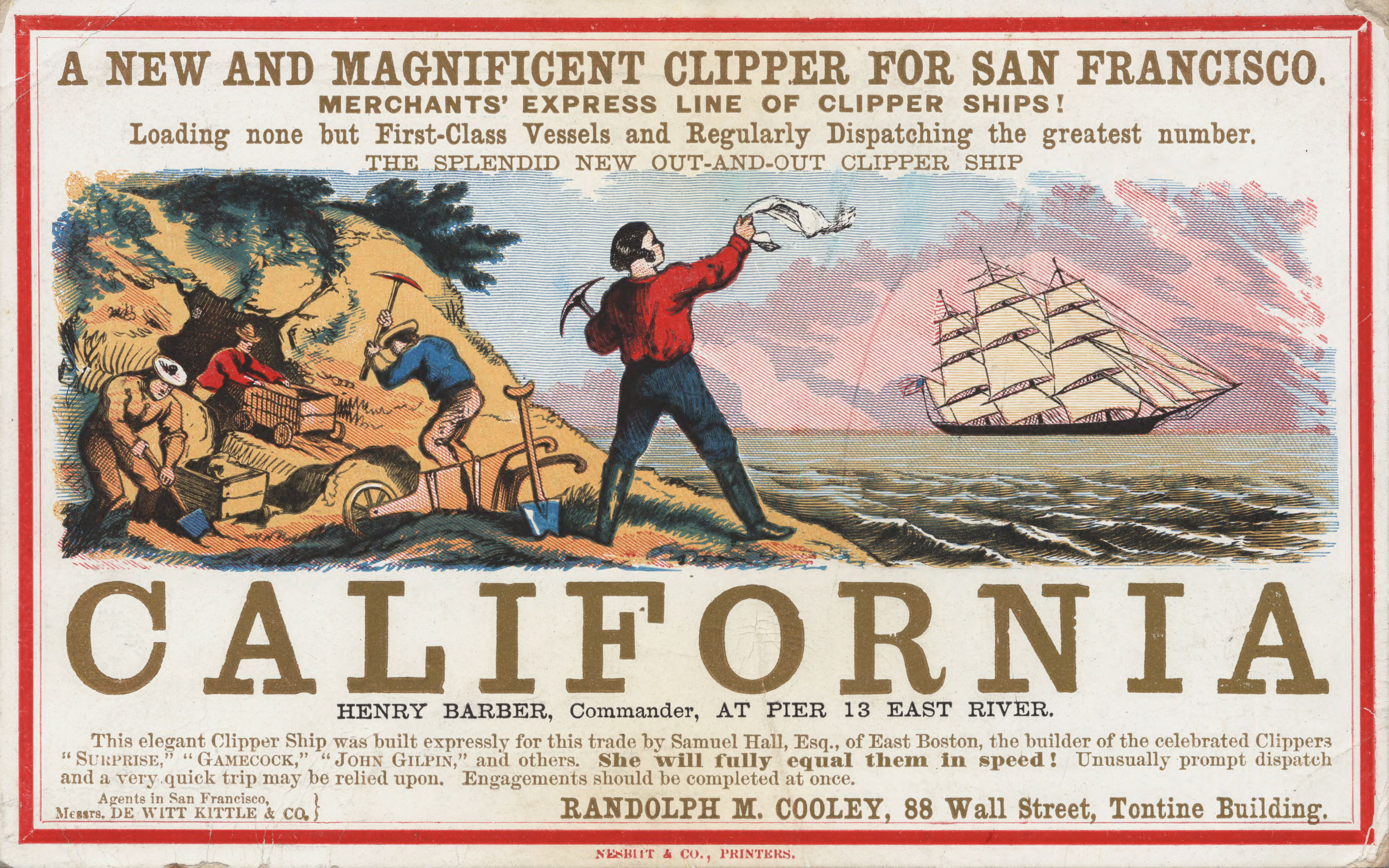
California Clipper 500

Suize left for San Francisco on a ship from LeHavre in 1850, along with a travelling companion named Francis Jaquart, whose ticket she had paid for. She cut her hair short and travelled wearing men's clothing. She listed herself on boarding papers as 'male' and 23 years old. The trip took five months.

After landing in San Francisco, Suize headed to the town of Jackson in Northern California, 35 miles south of where gold had been discovered at Sutter's Mill. To get there, she traveled by steamboat up the Sacramento River, and then by stagecoach to the newly created Gold rush town of Jackson Creek.

In order to mine for gold, Suize entered into a partnership "by handshake" with André Douet, a Charentais, who agreed to back her in return for reimbursement and some of the assets. Under this agreement, if the sponsor was not re-imbursed, the contract continues until the death of the debtor, when all the debtor's assets become property of the financial sponsor. In this way, Marie Suize acquired a mining concession.

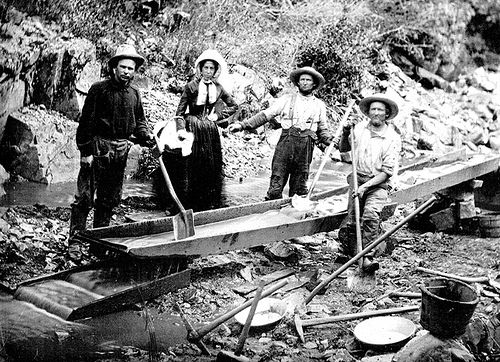
1850 Woman and Men in California Gold Rush. Suize was a gold miner who was arrested three times for wearing pants.

She did not go unnoticed; the few women found at mining sites were usually there as helpers, laundresses, or cooks. Suize caused quite a stir; a woman as head of a mining concession was already an exceptional case, but one day she appeared in trousers, solid miners' pants, because she was tired of wearing petticoats while digging in the middle of damp gravel.

An enterprising miner, she led her teams to extract gold, and defended her mines with weapon in hand. She earned the nickname "Joan of Arc". It was noted that she handled the shovel and pick-ax better than a man, and did not hesitate to take out her revolver as needed.

== Mining dispute ==
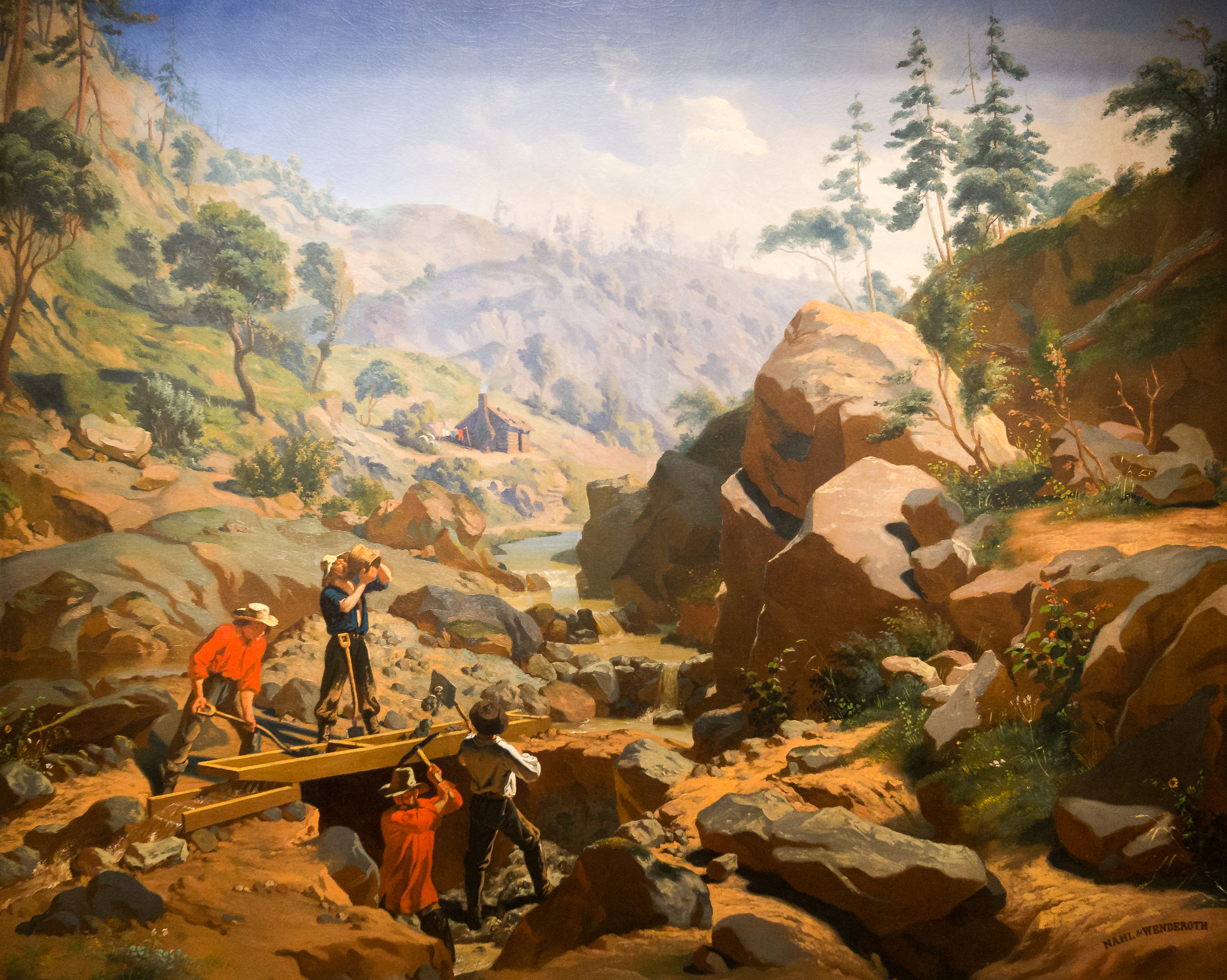
Smithsonian-Nahl and Wenderoth-Miners in the Sierras-2099 (cropped. Near Jackson, California, Suize had to clear out a group of rival miners from a mining tunnel like this one.

In 1860, Suize was working a mine at Humbug Hill near Jackson, on land adjoining a claim owned by a group of Canadians. The Canadians began excavating on Suize's land, and her French compatriots took her side, ready to invade the shaft where the Canadians were working. "Leave it to me," Suize said, "I'll take care of it". Suize handled the incident by blocking an opening in the shaft that let air in for the Canadian miners.

The Canadians, in danger of being asphyxiated, came out on their own. So she reopened the hole, and, armed with two revolvers and a soup tureen full of pepper, sat down at the entrance to the tunnel, where she had had her bed carried. She warned the Canadians that if they tried to enter, it would be pepper first, full in the face, then, at full force, the revolvers. For eight days and eight nights, the mine remained blocked by a company of 14 men, who did not dare to come close enough to force her to use her weapons. During this time, her workers were rapidly exploiting the land in dispute, without the Canadians being able to oppose it. When the task was finished, they admitted to being defeated and peace was concluded.

The dispute made her a local celebrity, and because of her pants, she was nicknamed Marie Pantalon.

== Arrests and trials ==
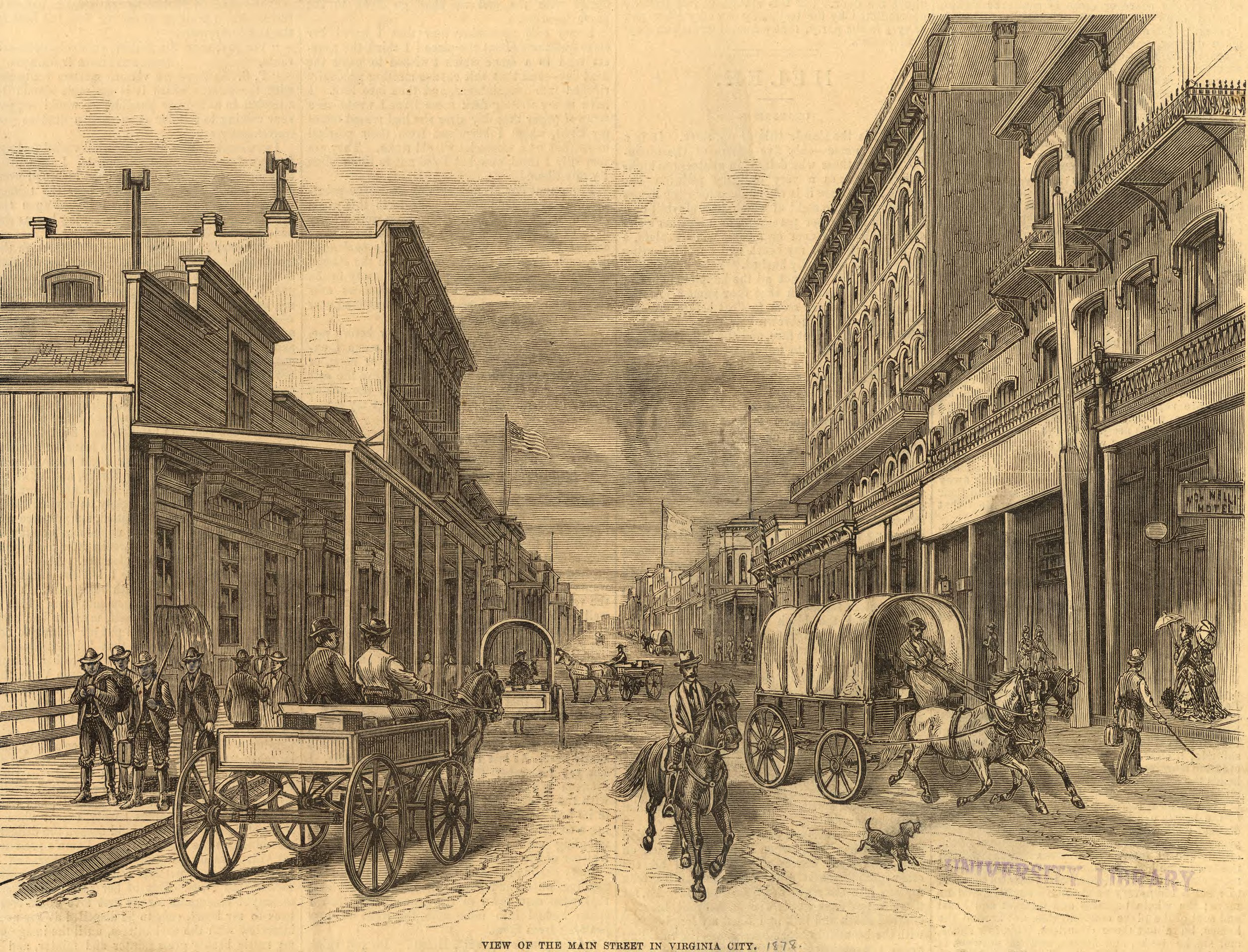
Suize's first trial for wearing pants took place in Virginia City, Nevada

California law at that time prohibited cross-dressing, unlike in France where it had been legal for a woman to dress like a man since 1800. Marie Suize, as a woman who wore pants, was consequently a transvestite and in violation of the law. Because of this, she was arrested and tried three times.

The first trial took place in Virginia City (Nevada) where Suize went to open a business. The court sentenced her to put her dress back on and leave town.

Later in 1871, during a stopover in a San Francisco tavern, she was arrested again and sent to court. Judge Sawyer fined her five dollars.

In Jackson, the third and final trial took a different turn, when an organization of suffragists became interested in her cause, and demonstrated in the streets to support her.

She claimed at the jury trial that she was wearing pants when she landed on American soil. The jurors decided that there was nothing wrong with her attire, that too much talk about it was a waste of time, and that it was better to go hunting. Suize was relieved, but to put an end to it at once, she sent an official request to the authorities of Virginia City in order to obtain the right to wear pants. She was successful in her petition, which added to her fame.

== Business activities ==
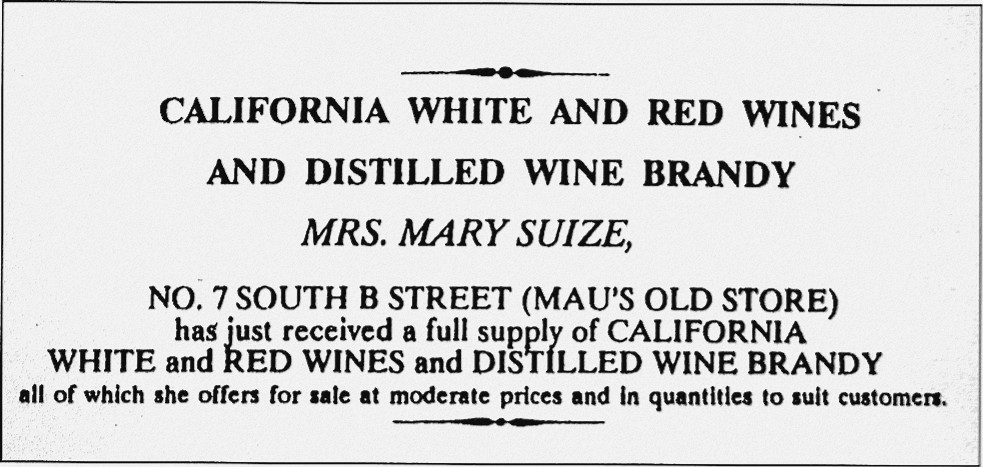
Marie Suize advertisement

When a hundred miners filed a petition for water supply work to be undertaken to facilitate their labor, she was the only woman to sign the petition, as "Marie Suize Pantalon". From then on, this is how she signed her name, claiming her nickname with pride. Journalists took an interest in her case and published articles about her.

Marie was joined by two of her brothers, Albert and Joseph, in the Jackson Creek area. Joseph, a locksmith, eventually moved to San Francisco and was recorded living there in 1885. Albert stayed in Jackson Creek, pursuing the same activities as his sister. There, he got involved in a lawsuit for which Marie paid his fines. In 1862, he returned to Thones with enough money to retire, where he spoke about his activities "in a disturbing country where the condemned are hung on a tree in the main square".

In association with her business partner André Douet, Marie expanded her activities. She began buying land not just for mining but also for agriculture. She built a ranch in the Jackson area, at Secreta Gulch near Slabtown, which she named "French Garden". There, she produced mulberry bushes and fruit trees, and started breeding silkworms.

Afterwards, she entered the wine making business, planting a variety of Zinfandel grapes of Hungarian origin, probably coming from the eastern United States. Her vineyard employed five people and produced fifty thousand liters of wine per year. In order to market her wine and brandy, she opened two stores, one in Virginia City, Nevada and the other in San Francisco.

To publicize her products, she ran ads in the local newspapers, in which she sometimes referred to herself as Madame Marie Suize Pantalon or as "Mrs. Pants".

In her later years in Virginia City, she gambled in the stock market, going as far as losing $150,000 in one sitting. She invested and lost money in the Comstock Lode. She once told a journalist that she had amassed a cubic meter of gold in her lifetime, but she lost her fortune by speculating, buying and selling.

== Death ==
On January 8, 1892, Marie Suize died of pneumonia at her property in Secreta Gulch, near Jackson in Amador County.

La Patrie, a newspaper from Montreal, recounted the end of her life: “Her body worn out by work, her mind tired from worrying about business, she gradually felt her strength declining, and a year ago, she decided to retire to her ranch, in the hope of restoring her health. It seemed that she was completely recovered, when she relapsed, and died in less than a week".

Her ranch was immediately transferred to her business investor and partner André Douet, but it took him ten years before he could sell it in 1902 to other French people, the Lintillacs. Douet died in 1904 near Clinton.

== Legacy and tributes ==
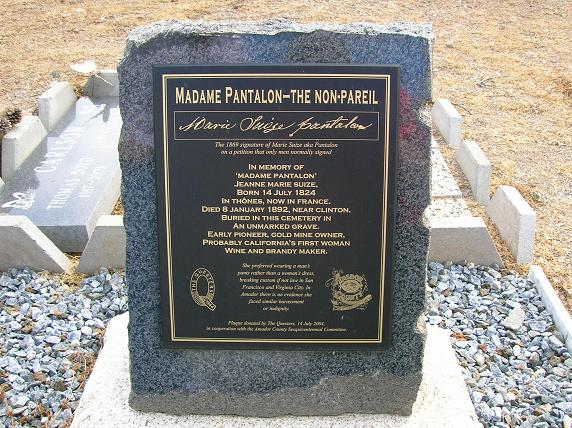
Epitaph on the tomb of Marie Suize

Susan G. Butruille, drawing from her book Women's Voices from the Mother Lode, created a show based on Marie Pantalon, which she presented in Thônes, France in 1999 and in several places in California and Oregon. Monique Fillion, honorary president of the Friends of the Val de Thônes, presented several multimedia conferences on Marie Suize.

In the early 21st century, the house built by Suize was the only building of that era that was still standing, because it was modeled after the chalets of the Val de Thônes. Made of wood, it is placed on a stone base, while the other buildings were built on planks on the ground.

Because she died penniless, Marie Suize was not entitled to a stele in Saint Patrick's cemetery in Jackson, where she rested in an anonymous grave. On July 14, 2004, for the 150th anniversary of the creation of Amador County, a tombstone was built 112 years after her death, as a tribute to Suize and her fight for women's rights in California.

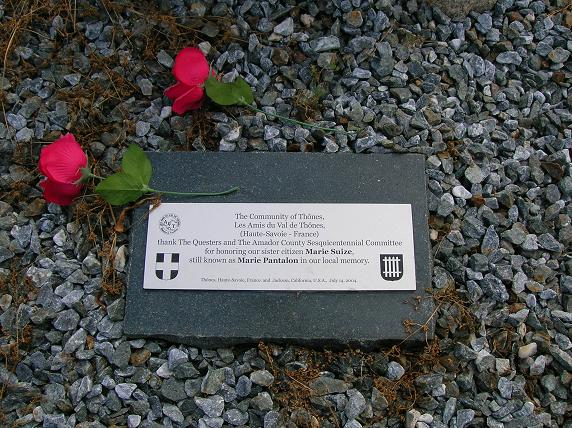
Plaque des Amis du Val de Thônes

On that day, for the 150th anniversary of the creation of Amador County, an unusual French American Bastille Day took place in the Catholic Cemetery in Jackson, capital of the county, as organized by The Sesquicentennial Committee, the organizing committee of the festivities, and the historical society The Questers. Suize was declared Woman of the Year of Amador County.

The friends of the Val de Thônes had the plaque on the monument engraved with her signature, found at the bottom of a petition for the improvement of the water supply on the farms, which was unique because women then were not allowed to sign petitions.

A documentary, Marie Suize Pantalon, Itinerary of a Pioneer, was produced in 2020.

== See also ==
- Women in the California Gold Rush
