= Daniel Franklin Pilario =

Filipino theologian, writer and educator

Daniel Franklin Pilario, CM

President of Adamson University
- In office 2023–present
- Preceded by: Marcelo V. Manimtim, CM

Personal details
- Born: Oslob, Cebu
- Education: Katholieke Universiteit Leuven; University of Santo Tomas; Adamson University
- Occupation: Theologian, writer, and educator

Daniel Franklin E. Pilario, CM is a Filipino contextual theologian, writer, educator, and Vincentian Catholic priest. He currently serves as the 7th president of Adamson University. He was a former professor and dean of St. Vincent School of Theology.

He earned his Doctorate in Sacred Theology from Katholieke Universiteit Leuven in Belgium, License in Sacred Theology from the same institution, Bachelor of Arts in Philosophy from Adamson University, and Bachelor in Sacred Theology from the University of Santo Tomas.

In May 2026, Pilario was named head of church and education relations for the Truth and Reconciliation Commission, an independent body tasked with investigating the Philippine drug war.

== Early life ==
Pilario was born in Barangay (village) Hagdan, Oslob, Cebu.

== Career ==
=== As professor and dean of School of Theology ===
From 2002 to 2023, Pilario wrote scholarly articles and Op-ed pieces meant for colleagues and policymakers, and helped promote social justice.

=== As Adamson University president ===
As president of Adamson University beginning in 2023, Pilario reminded his colleagues that their Vincentian institution is not a business and they have the challenge that runs deeper. He said: "In the language of business, our students are our clients or customers. They should be happy with the way that we serve them. Of course, we have the duty to form and discipline them. But our students can feel whether we are fake or sincere, whether we do it as power-tripping or in service to their growth... (W)e should take care of the most vulnerable among us." He said that they would focus on the university's "technical education and the Vincentians' humanities tradition."

In December 2024, Bordado and twelve others filed the third impeachment complaint against Vice President Sara Duterte, which cited four constitutional grounds for impeachment such as betrayal of public trust for her office's alleged misuse of confidential funds.

Regarding Adamson's inclusion in the 2026 Quacquarelli Symonds (QS) World University Rankings, Pilario noted, "It is a sign that our mission to serve the people at the margins through quality education is relevant beyond our national borders."

On May 27, 2026, the independent and civilian-led Truth and Reconciliation Commission (or the EJK Truth Commission) was established to investigate the Philippine drug war initiated by President Rodrigo Duterte, with Pilario named as head of church and education relations, institutional reforms recommendations, and truth literacy.

== Major publications ==
=== Books ===
- Knowing the Tree by Its Leaves: Re-reading Vincent de Paul in the Philippine Context. Manila, Philippines: Congregation of the Mission, 1994. xvi. + 185.
- Proclaim the Good News to the Poor: CM Convocation 1995, co-author with Manuel Ginete. Manila, Philippines: Congregation of the Mission, 1995.
- Pakiglambigit: A Story of the Basic Ecclesial Communities in an Urban Context. The San Roque Parish Experience. Pasay City, Philippines: Paulines Publishing House, 1997. Xv + 267.
- Against Forgetfulness: The Forum for Liberation Theologies. Remembering a Decade (1990-2000). Edited by John Reis and Daniel Franklin Pilario. Leuven: Centre for Liberation Theologies, 2001. Cf.
- Mediations in Theology: Georges De Schrijver's Wager and Liberation Theologies. Edited by Jacques Haers, Edmund Guzman, Daniel Franklin Pilario and Lope Florente Lesigues. Annua Nuntia Lovaniensia. Leuven: Peeters, 2004. Cf.
- Inter-Sectiones: A Journal of the Katholieke Univeristeit Leuven. Faculty of Theology, Editor. Volume 2000, Issue No. 2.
- Back to the Rough Grounds of Praxis: Exploring Theological Method with Pierre Bourdieu. BETL Series. Leuven: Leuven University Press and Peeters, 2005. Cf.
- The Ambivalence of Sacrifice. Edited by Luiz Carlos Susin, Daniel Franklin Pilario, Diego Irarrazával. Concilium: International Journal of Theology 49. 2013/4. London: SCM Press, 2013. Cf.
- Christian Orthodoxy. Edited by Felix Wilfred and Daniel Franklin Pilario. Concilium 2014/2. London: SCM Press, 2014. 157 pages. Translated into Spanish, Italian, German, Portuguese. Cf.
- Globalization and the Church of the Poor. Edited by Daniel Franklin Pilario, Lisa Sowle Cahill, Maria Clara Bingemer and Sarojini Nadar. Concilium 2015. No. 3. London: SCM Press, 2015. Cf.
- Philippine Local Churches after the Spanish Regime: Quae Mari Sinico and Beyond. Edited by Daniel Franklin Pilario and Gerardo Vibar. SVST Interdisciplinary Series. Manila: Adamson University, 2015. Cf.
- Second Plenary Council of the Philippines: Quo vadis? Edited Eric Genilo, Agnes Brazal and Daniel Franklin Pilario. SVST Interdisciplinary Series. Quezon City: Ateneo de Manila University Press, 2015. Cf.

=== Journal articles ===
- Politics of Culture and the Project of Inculturation. In Jahrbuch für kontextuelle Theologien 1999. Edited by Missionswissenschaftliches Institute Missio, e.V. (Frankfurt, Main: IKO – Verlag für Interkulturelle Kommunkation, 1999),172-94. Cf.
- Editor’s Introduction. Inter-Sectiones: A Journal of the K.U.Leuven Faculty of Theology Volume 2000, Issue No. 2.
- Gift-Exchange in Sacramentology: A Critical Assessment from the Perspective of Pierre Bourdieu. Questions Liturgiques/Studies in Liturgy 82 (2001): 80–96. Reprinted in Contemporary Sacramental Contours of a God Incarnate, ed. LievenBoeve and Lambert Leijssen (Leuven: Peeters, 2001), 85–101. Cf.
