= Windley (surname) =

Windley is a surname. Notable people with this surname include:

- Bill Windley (1868–1953), Australian rules footballer
- Brian Windley (1936–2025), British geologist
- Callum Windley (born 1991), British rugby player
- Carol Windley (born 1947), Canadian short story writer and novelist
- Chris Windley, drummer of the band Dallas Frasca
- Edward Henry Windley (1909–1972), British governor of the Gambia
- Jade Windley (born 1990), British tennis player
