= Mary Jane Dunphe =

American musician

- Born: November 29, 1989 (age 36); Portland, Maine, U.S.
- Origin: Olympia, Washington, U.S.
- Occupations: Poet, Musician
- Years active: 2008-present
- Labels: Sub Pop, Pop Wig
- Formerly of: Vexx, CC Dust, CCFX, County Liners, Gen Pop, Pinocchio
- Website: mjdunphe.net

Mary Jane Dunphe (born November 29, 1989) is an American musician. Dunphe has been a member of the bands Vexx, Gen Pop, The Country Liners, CCFX, and CC Dust. In addition to making music as part of numerous bands, Dunphe is also a solo musician.

Dunphe released her debut solo album in 2023. The album, Stage of Love, was released through Pop Wig Records. Prior to the albums release, Dunphe released the singles Stage of Love, Always Gonna Be The Same, and Longing Loud. The album was listed as one of "24 Great Records You May Have Missed: Spring/Summer 2023" by Pitchfork. and the title track was listed at number 100 on Pitchfork's "The Best Songs of 2023" list.

In January 2024, Dunphe released two new songs, "Fix Me" and "Seasons" through Sub Pop.
