= Mary Jane Rathbun =

Mary Jane Rathbun may refer to:

- Mary J. Rathbun (1860–1943), American zoologist
- Brownie Mary (1922–1999), American medical cannabis activist
