= Mary Jane Hale Welles =

American wife of Gideon Welles

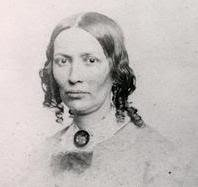
- Born: Mary Jane Hale Welles; June 18, 1817; Glastonbury, Connecticut
- Died: February 28, 1886 (aged 68); Hartford, Connecticut
- Spouse: Gideon Welles

Mary Jane Hale Welles (June 18, 1817 - February 28, 1886) was the wife of Gideon Welles and is known for her hand-written letters, which appear in various museums.

== Early life and education ==
She was born as Mary Jane Hale on 18th June 1817 in Glastonbury, Connecticut, to a lawyer father Elias White Hale and mother Jane Mullhallan Hale.

She grew up in remote Lewistown, Pennsylvania, with her family, including two brothers, the younger Elias and the older Reuben.

== Personal life ==
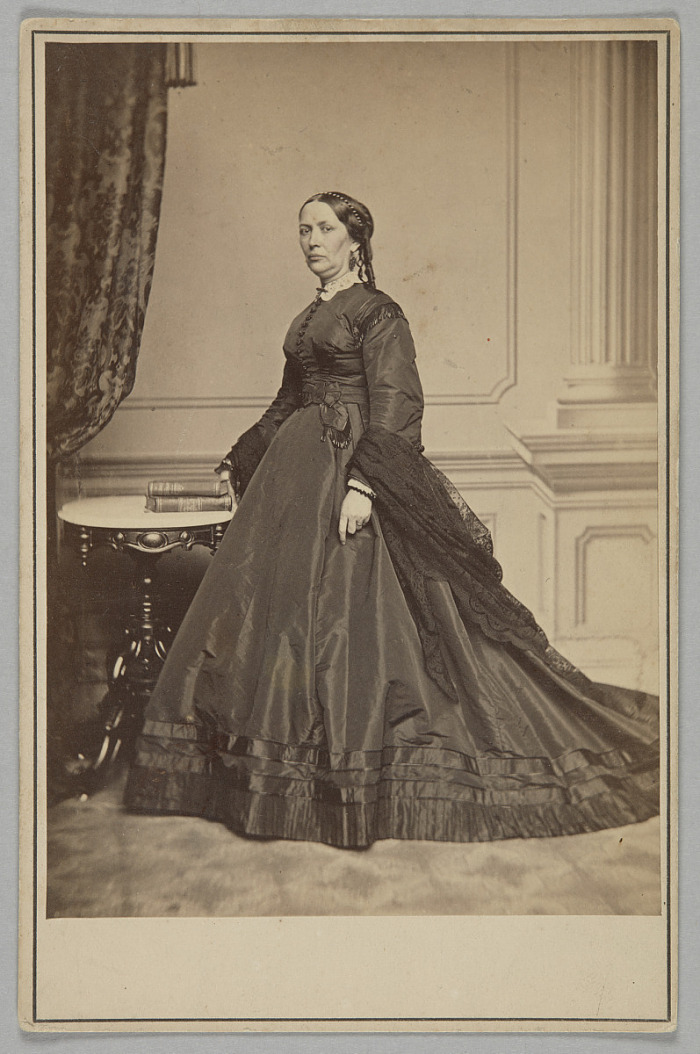
Mary Jane Hale Welles in a funeral dress, 1862

As a teenager she was noted for her strong-mindedness and, despite parental objections, communicated directly with romantic interest, her first cousin Gideon Welles before marrying him on June 16, 1835. The wedding took place in Lewiston.

The couple had nine children, including:

1. Anna Jane Welles (1836 – 1852)
2. Samuel Welles (1838 – 1853)
3. Edward Gideon Welles (1840 – 1843)
4. Thomas Gideon Welles (1846 – 1892)
5. John Arthur Welles (1849 – 1883)
6. Herbert Welles (1852 – 1853)
7. Hubert Welles (1853 – 1862)
8. Mary Juanita Welles (1854 – 1858)

Only three children lived into adulthood. She attempted to adopt a girl in 1847, but was rejected. The family lived on H Street, between 9th and 10th street, in Washington D.C.

Her husband was the Chief of the Bureau of Provisions and Clothing for the United States Navy before becoming the Secretary of the Navy for presidents Abraham Lincoln and Andrew Johnson.

== Letters ==
Welles' letters appear in the Smithsonian Libraries and Archives, and in the University of Michigan's William L. Clements Library. She wrote to her mother about her marriage, the activity and health of her children and to her husband about her social life and the community reaction to the war draft.

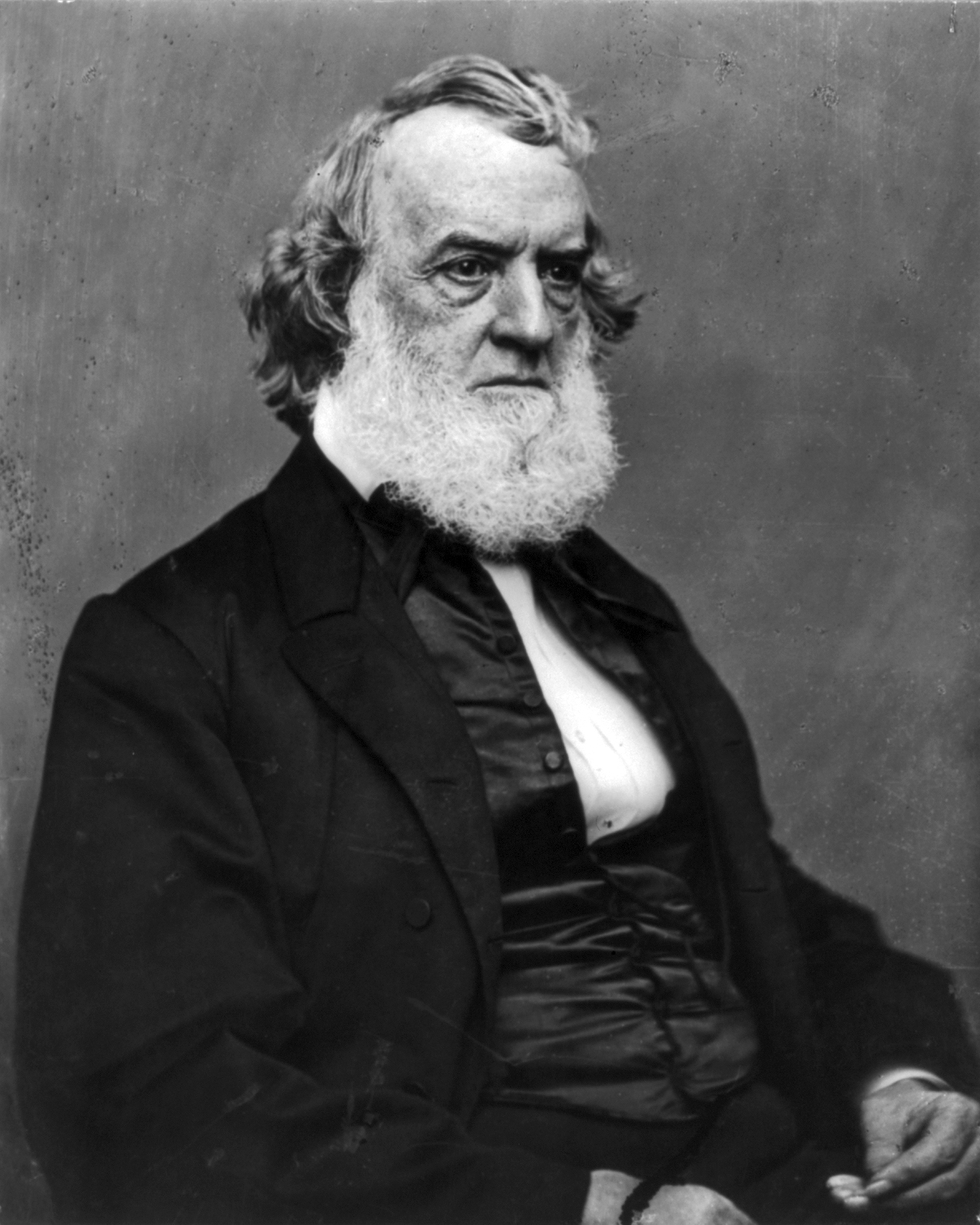
Gideon Welles

== Death ==
Welles died on February 28, 1886, in Hartford. She is buried adjacent to her husband in Cedar Hill Cemetery.
