= Mary-Jane Rivers =

New Zealand community development leader

Mary-Jane Rivers ONZM
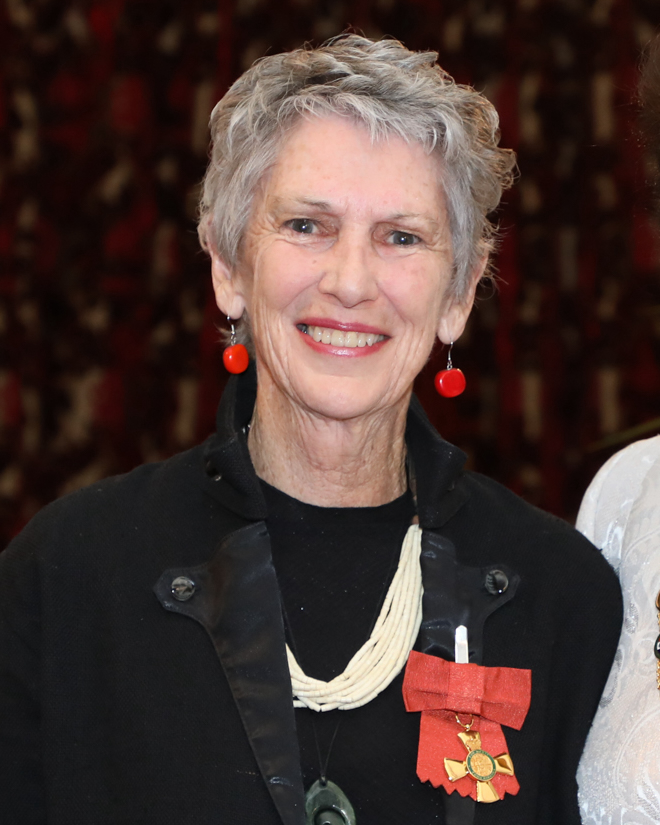
- Awards: Officer of the New Zealand Order of Merit

Academic background
- Education: Victoria University of Wellington

Mary Jane Rivers ONZM (known as Mary-Jane, born 1951) is a New Zealand community development leader. In 2024 Rivers was appointed an Officer of the New Zealand Order of Merit for services to community-led development, governance and education.

== Early life and education ==
Rivers was born in Christchurch in 1951. She earned a Bachelor of Arts with Honours at Victoria University of Wellington in 1986.

== Career ==
In the early 1970s, while working at the Upper Hutt City Council, Rivers encountered a woman and her children in need of a safe house. The only women's refuge in New Zealand at that time was in Christchurch. Rivers helped found New Zealand's first North Island Women's Refuge in the Hutt Valley, despite receiving opposition from church groups concerned that women's refuges damaged families. Rivers then led the Social Policy Unit in the Ministry of Works and Development, where she was responsible for assessing the community impact of large development projects.

In 1985 Rivers was appointed as the Ministry for Women's first policy director, the ministry only having been established the previous year. She was also the first chief executive of the Citizens Advice Bureaux. In 2006, Rivers founded Inspiring Communities, an organisation aimed at supporting community-led development.

Since 2015 Rivers has chaired REAP (Rural Education Activities Programmes) Aotearoa, the national body representing the thirteen individual programmes. Rivers has consulted on community development internationally, and was involved in founding UnionAID, an international development agency, and served on the board for twelve years.

Rivers has worked on food resilience, and in 2022 was a founding trustee of He Puāwai, which works in the Hutt Valley.

== Honours and awards ==
In the 2024 New Year Honours Rivers was appointed an Officer of the New Zealand Order of Merit for services to community-led development, governance and education.
