= Mary Jane Alvero =

Filipino businesswoman

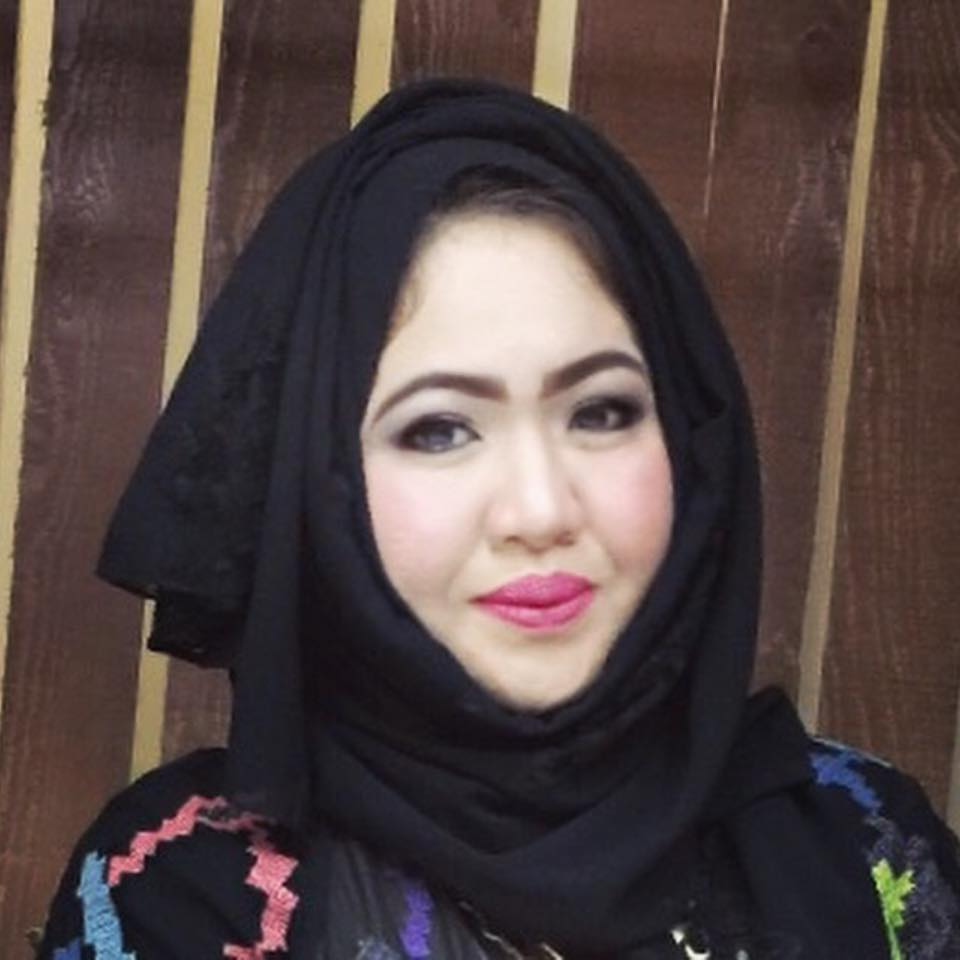
- Self-portrait of Mary Jane Alvero-Al Mahdi.
- Born: April 29, 1970 (age 56); Makati, Philippines
- Other name: Mary Jane Alvero- Al Mahdi
- Occupation: Group CEO of Prime Group
- Years active: 1998–present

Mary Jane Alvero-Al Mahdi (born April 29, 1970) is a CEO of Geoscience Testing Laboratory. She has performed many safety tests on construction materials, food, water, and air throughout the United Arab Emirates. Some of her accomplished works are mega-projects like Downtown Burj Dubai.

== Early life and education ==
Mary Jane Alvero-Al Mahdi was born in Makati, Philippines on April 29, 1970. She was born to Renato Alvero and Martha Alvero, along with four other children. Her father supported the family as a successful businessman, until he began to develop emphysema. Her father could no longer maintain the business and stayed confined to a bed, leaving her mother to take care of the children and at the same time worked hard to keep the family financially stable. Alvero-Al Mahdi took part and helped her mother by working part time jobs, and at the same time, studied chemical engineering at Adamson University. She graduated, and received her B.S. in chemical engineering in 1991. After graduating, she took the Chemical Engineer Licensure Exam and passed. She worked under a company in Manila before she accepted the job offer in Dubai.

== Professional career ==
Alvero-Al Mahdi began her career at first in Manila as a trainee of the Department of Environment and Natural Resources. She helped in reviving a biologically dead river called Pasig. After six months of finishing up her work on Pasig, she took on the job at Galadari Hoshiery Mills, a textile factory in the United Arabic Emirates as a quality control engineer in 1992. Her employers soon saw that she was overly qualified for the job and soon she promoted from Galadari Hoshiery Mills to Al Futtaim Wimpey Laboratories. She worked her way up to higher positions such as, chemist to civil engineer to Chief Chemist. After working for Al Futtaim Wimpey Laboratories for six years, she was scouted by the Geoscience Testing Laboratories to become a Quality Assurance Officer. Similar to her career in Al Futtaim Wimpey Laboratories, she rose to several promotions to finally the position of CEO of Geoscience Testing Laboratory in 2003.

== Accomplishments ==
Throughout the years, Alvero-Al Mahdi has been recognized in various awards from both the Philippines; as well as, the UAE.

- Adamson University Most Outstanding Alumna 2008 (Dubai Chapter)
- Emirates Businesswoman Awardee Professional Category 2008 (UAE)
- Adamson University Most Outstanding Alumna 2009
- Woman of Substance 2009 Honoree
- Professional Regulation Commission Most Distinguished Chemical Engineer 2009
- Kuwentong Diyerto "Bida sa Negosyo" Awardee 2009
- Blas F. Ople Awardee 2009
- Bagong Bayani Most Outstanding Employee Awardee 2009
- Most Outstanding Adamsonian Award 2012
- Presidential Award for Filipinos Overseas, Pamana ng Pilipino Award 2012
- Emirates Woman, Woman of the Year Award, Visionary Category 2013
- "100 Most Influential Filipina Around the World, Thought and Innovation Leaders Category 2013
- Gr8t Women Awards in the Middle East, Special Mention in the Field of Geoscience 2014
