= Jeanette Windle =

American novelist

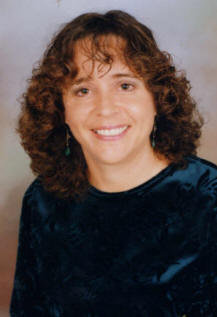
Jeanette Windle

Jeanette Windle is an American writer of both children's and thriller novels, often with Christian themes. Her books have been nominated for the Christy Award and the Christian Book Award. She won Focus on Fiction's 2005 Deserted Island Book Award, the South Florida Writers Association 2004 Celebrity Author's Award and 2002 Mabel Meadows Staats Award. Windle is editor of BCM World magazine and has served as a Vice-President of the South Florida Writers Association.

== Books ==
- CrossFire (2000)

The Parker Twins series:

- Cave of the Inca Re (2001)
- Jungle Hideout (2001)
- Mystery at Death Canyon (2002)
- Captured in Colombia (2002)
- Secret of the Dragon Mark (2002)
- Race for the Secret Code (2002)

Other:

- Jana's Journal (2002)
- Firestorm (sequel to CrossFire) (2004)
- The DMZ (2002)
- Zona de Despeje (The DMZ in Spanish) (2006)
- Betrayed (2008)
- Paz Ardiendo (2008) (Betrayed in Spanish)
- Veiled Freedom (2009)
- Freedom's Stand (2011)
- Congo Dawn (2011)
