= Mary Jane Megquier =

American businesswoman

Mary Jane Megquier (1813–1899) was an American businesswoman. She participated in the California Gold Rush. She is mentioned alongside Luzena Wilson and Mary Ellen Pleasant among the women who managed to profit among the miners of the Gold Rush by selling 'female gendered" domestic services to the miners.

In 1849, she travelled with her husband from Turner, Maine to San Francisco via Panama. In San Francisco, she ran a boarding house and enjoyed the freer society. In Gold Rush California of the 1850s, women were few, and as domestic tasks were gendered female and considered shameful for men to perform, it was possible for women to make a fortune by selling household- and domestic services such as cooking, cleaning, boarding and washing to men.

Her writings are published in Apron of Gold: The Letters of Mary Jane Megquier from San Francisco, 1849-1856, edited by Polly Welts Kaufman, University of New Mexico Press, 1994 ISBN 978-0-8263-1500-7 .
