= Mary Jane Windle =

- Born: February 16, 1825; Wilmington
- Died: after 1882; Philadelphia
- Occupation: Writer

Mary Jane Windle (born February 16, 1825) was an American short-story writer and journalist.

== Life and career ==
Mary Jane Windle was born on February 16, 1825 in Wilmington, Delaware.

Windle published two collections of her short stories of historical fiction, Truth and Fancy (1850) and Legend of the Waldenses, and Other Tales (1852). Zohara Boyd writes that Windle's fiction is "irritating and boring" and wildly historically inaccurate.

Windle worked in Washington DC as a society columnist. Her observations of Washington society and Congressional proceedings were praised at the time. Windle's sympathies were unabashedly anti-Northern. Boyd writes: "In Windle's sketches, Southern delegates, cabinet members, and judges are all uniformly handsome, learned, and eloquent; Northerners are all cold, haughty, and wrongheaded. Southern women, of course, are prettier, more elegant, and more sweet-tempered."

Windle was arrested under suspicion for being a Confederate spy. She was apprehended on August 22, 1861, leaving Alexandria, Virginia. Mary Chesnut wrote in her diary that Windle was "boldy proclaiming herself a secessionist & saying she is in correspondence with Confederate leaders." At the end of the war, she was arrested again, one of a number of people in the capitol arrested for seditious outbursts following President Lincoln's assassination,. In Reveille in Washington, Margaret Leech writes "Windle was accused of maliciously tearing down flags from her boardinghouse, and throwing them into the street".

At some point, for unknown reasons, she began going by the name Mary Jane McLane and was even crossing out references to Mary Jane Windle she found at the Library of Congress and replacing them with Mary Jane McLane.

In 1882, she was living in an attic in Philadelphia, Pennsylvania, in poverty after loaning most of her money to a relative who died without repaying her. The Philadelphia Times described her: "Sometimes she carries in her hand a huge umbrella; sometimes an immense handkerchief grasped by one corner and floating about her like a flag, and occasionally she displays in her cotton gloved hands a huge slice of bread and butter as she walks."

== Works ==
- Truth and Fancy (1850)
- Legend of the Waldenses, and Other Tales (1852)
- Life at White Sulphur Springs, or Pictures of a Pleasant Summer (1857)
- Life in Washington and Life Here and There (1859)
