= Casa del Rey Hotel =

Hotel in Santa Cruz, California

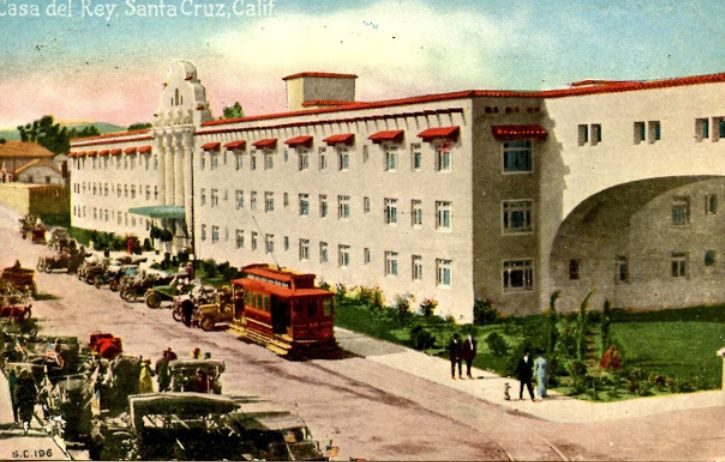
- Casa del Rey Hotel in 1911 corner of Beach Street and Cliff Street

- Location within Northern California Casa del Rey Hotel (California) Casa del Rey Hotel (the United States)

General information
- Location: Santa Cruz, California, 500 Beach Street and Cliff Street
- Coordinates: 36.964539°N 122.018890°W
- Opened: 1911 (original building gone in 1989)
- Cost: $500,000 in 1911
- Owner: Fred Swanton
- Management: Santa Cruz Seaside Company

Other information
- Number of rooms: 500
- Number of restaurants: 3

Website
- Casa del Rey Hotel

Casa del Rey Hotel (House of the King) was a resort hotel in Santa Cruz, California. During World War II the hotel was converted to a Naval Convalescent Hospital, Santa Cruz. The hotel was built in 1911 by Fred Swanton on Beach Street as part of a Santa Cruz Boardwalk development plan. The resort hotel had a pool, gardens, and a grand pedestrian bridge that crossed the street for access to the beach. The hotel was located at approximately 500 Beach Street and Cliff Street. In addition to the hotel, cottage apartments were also built. After the war, the hotel became a senior citizen housing facility. The 1989 Loma Prieta earthquake caused serious damage to the hotel, and it was subsequently demolished. The site is now a parking lot across the street from the Santa Cruz Beach Boardwalk amusement park.

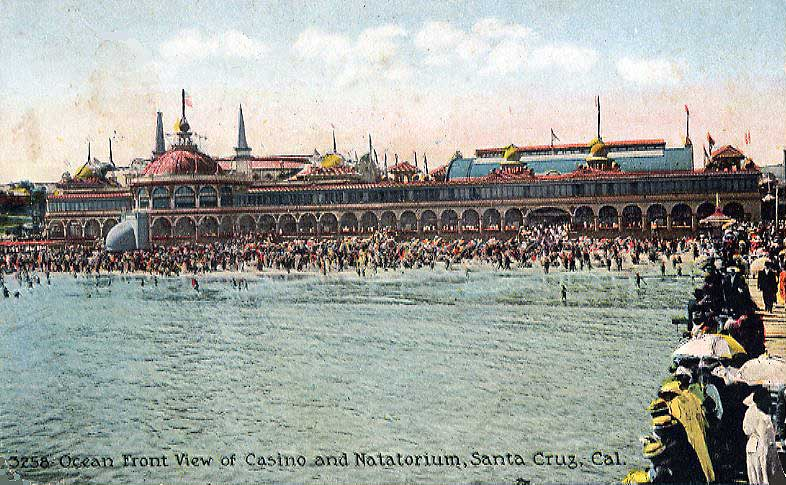
Casino and Natatorium in Santa Cruz in 1910

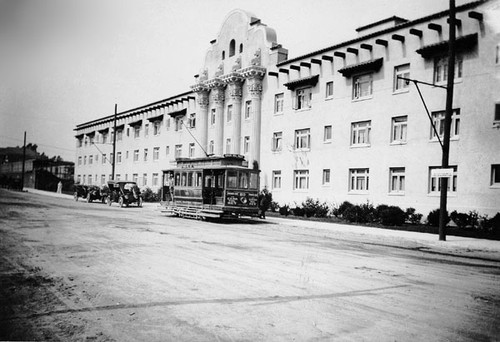
The Casa del Rey hotel in 1912 with a Union Traction streetcar Number 20 service between the hotel and the Union Station.

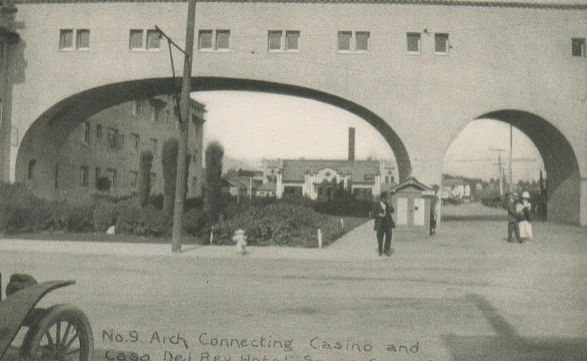
The Casa del Rey hotel's pedestrian bridge in 1915

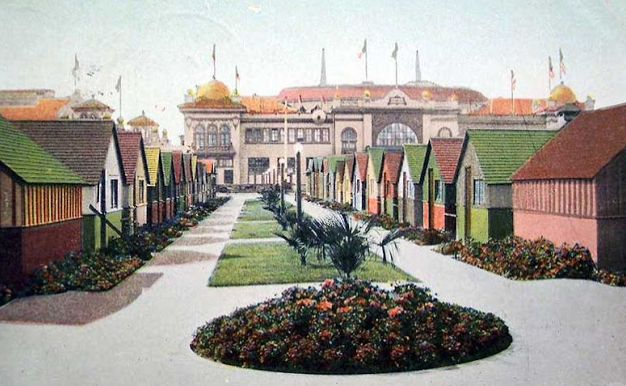
1907 photo of the multi-colored Cottage City, by Neptune's Casino

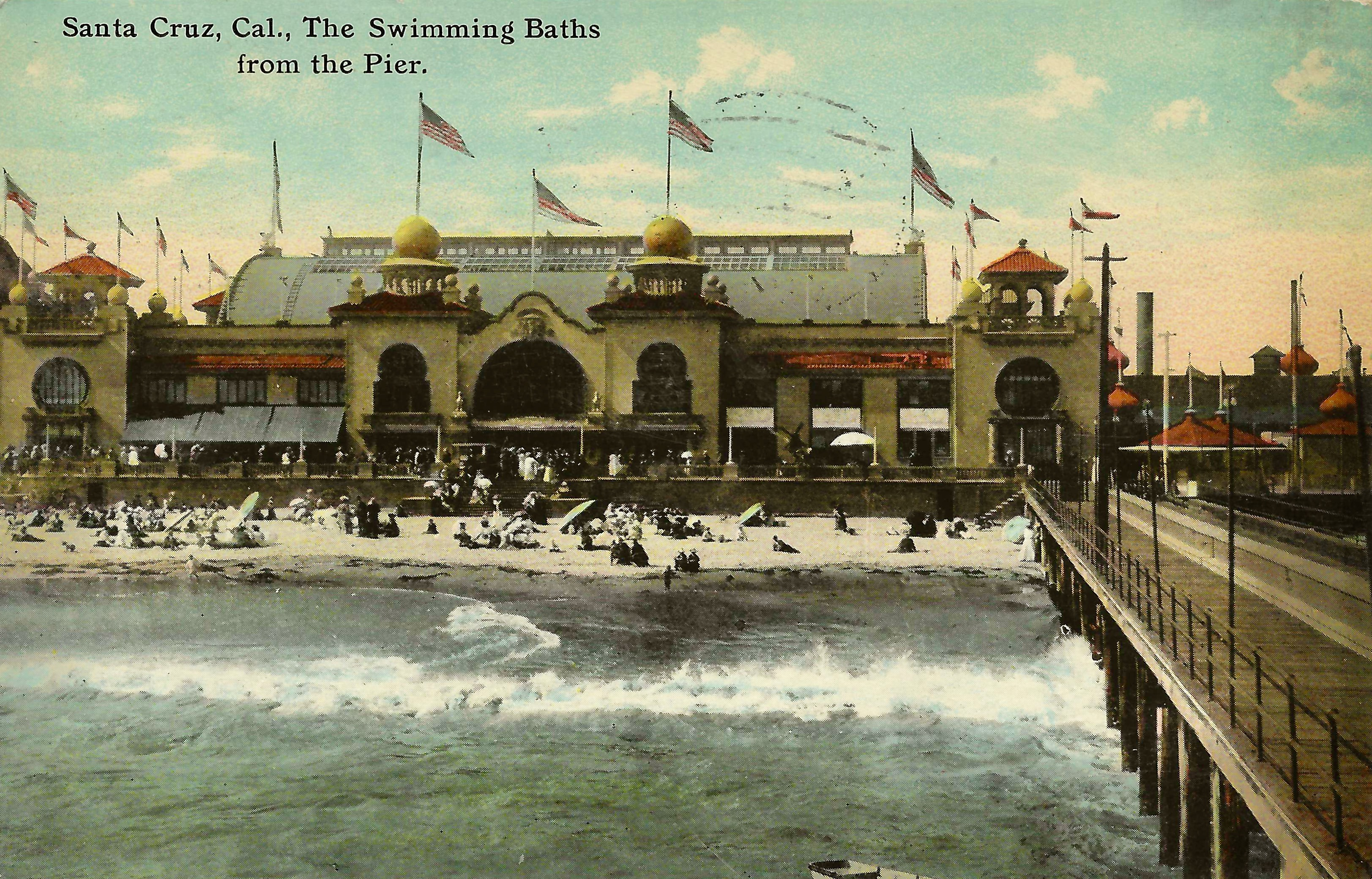
Santa Cruz Natatorium Swimming Baths at the Boardwalk, Pacific Novelty Company Postcards, circa 1910.

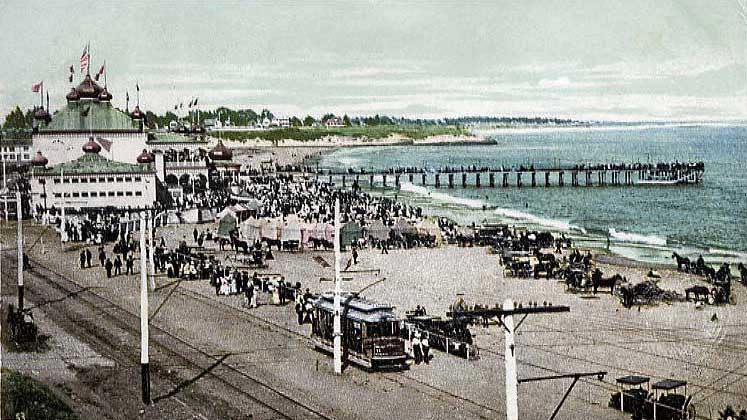
The 1904 Neptune's Casino, Santa Cruz pleasure pier, horses and an electric trolley

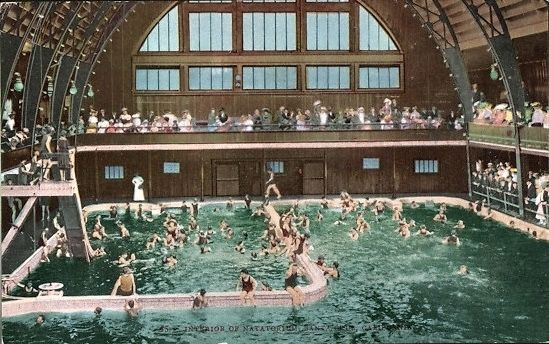
Interior of Plunge Natatorium in 1910

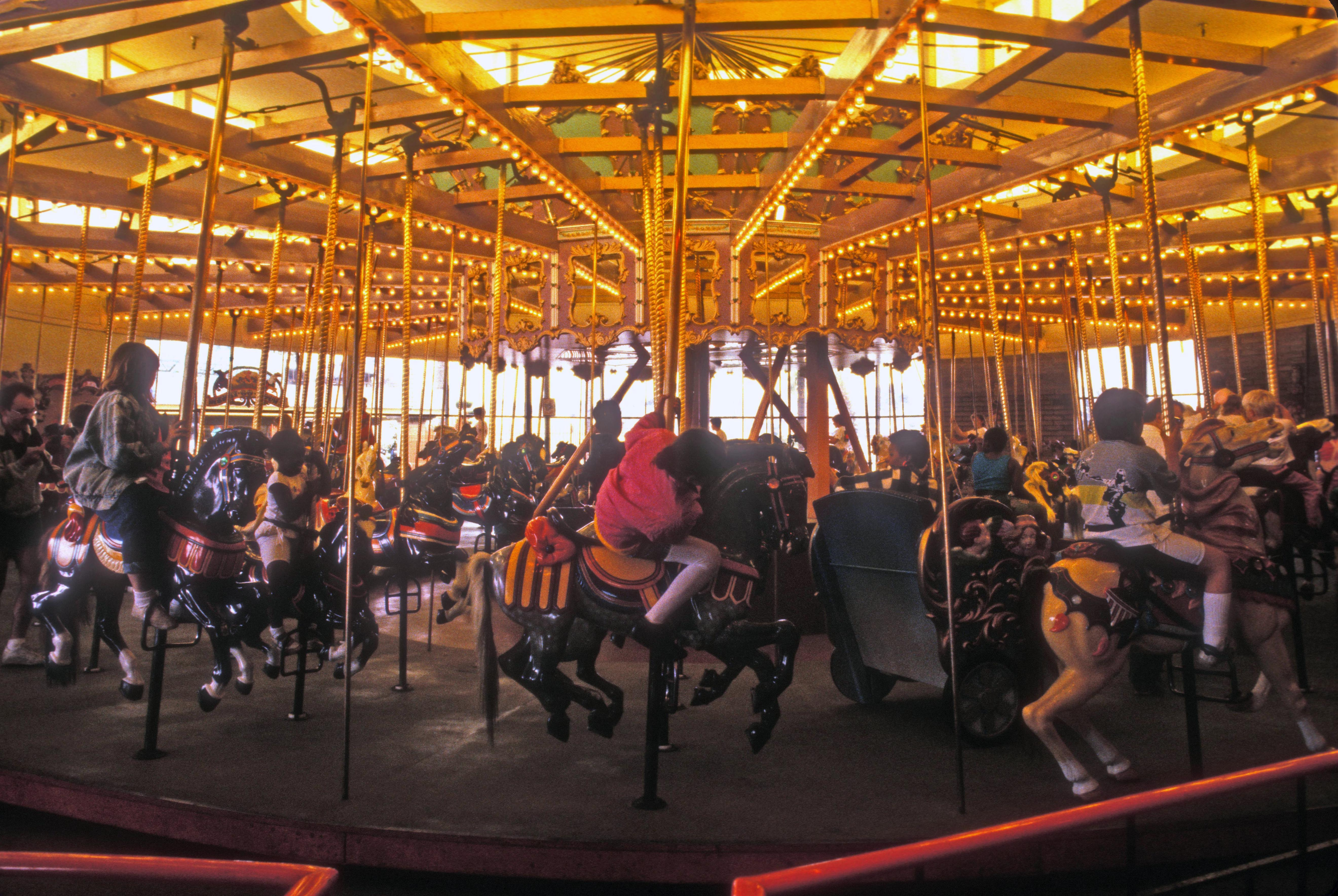
1911 Santa Cruz Looff Carousel

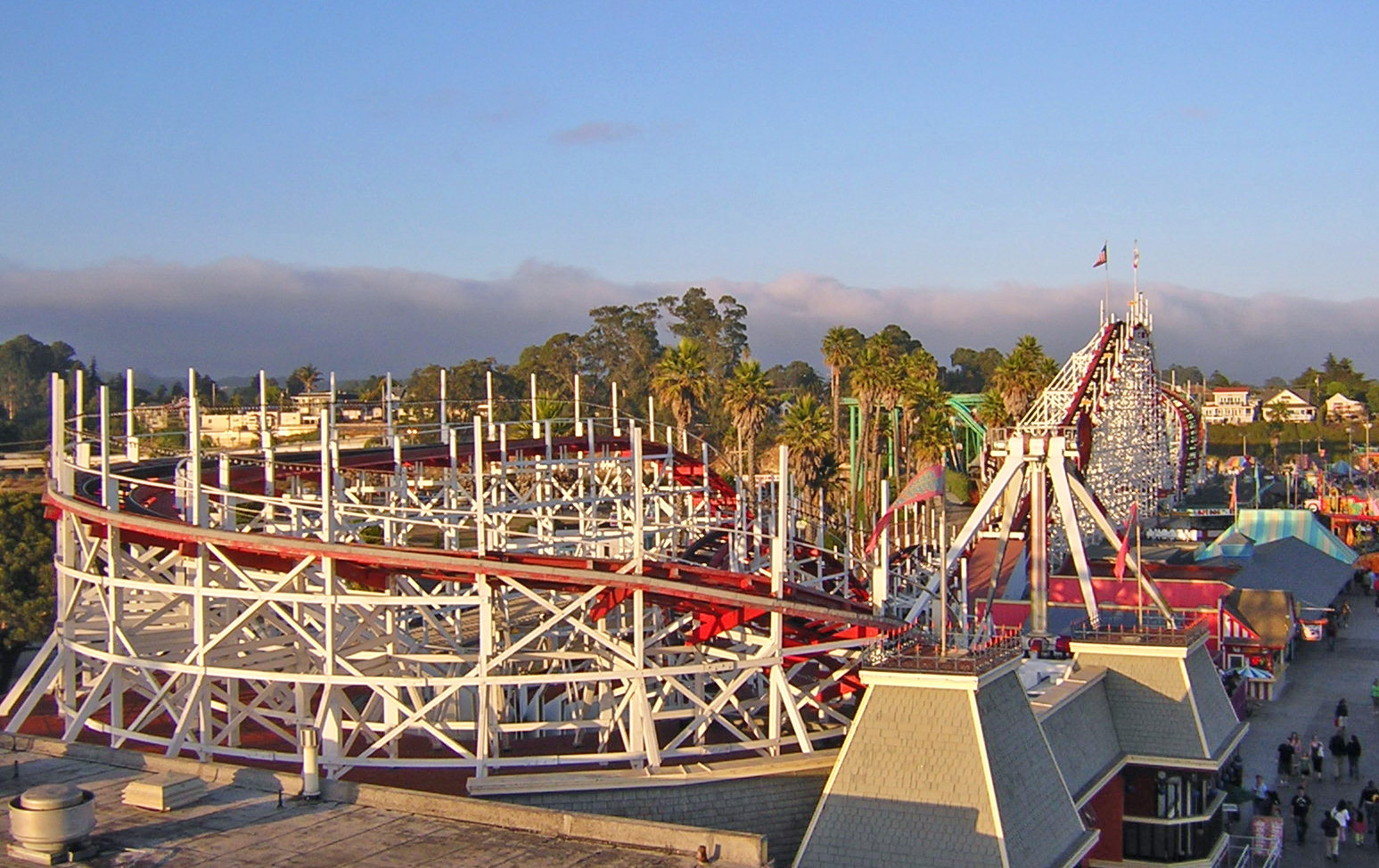
1924 Giant Dipper

== History ==
=== Casino ===
The Santa Cruz Railroad opened in 1874, but Santa Cruz did not immediately become a resort destination. The Santa Cruz Railroad became part of the Southern Pacific Railroad in 1881. Santa Cruz gained popularity as a resort in 1887, when the railroad shortened the line to Santa Cruz. Fred W. Swanton first built a casino, Neptune's Casino, and a beach tent city in 1904. The Casino offered 500 beach dressing rooms, a theater, a cafe, seaside grill, ballroom, and roof gardens. The Casino was designed by architect Edward L. Van Cleeck. The Casino was a bar with entertainment, but gambling was never legal there. However, it was widely known that visitors could find boats at the pleasure pier, now called the Santa Cruz Wharf, to take them out into the harbor to gamble in ships during the 1910s and 1920s. Swanton built an amusement park near the pier, sometimes referred to as the Coney Island of the West. In 1911, the Charles I. D. Looff family built a merry-go-round carousel and in 1924, the Giant Dipper roller coaster.. Both the Santa Cruz Looff Carousel and Roller Coaster are National Historic Landmarks. The Casino changed its name to Cocoanut Grove from 1920 to 1933 during prohibition. On June 22, 1906, a fire started in the kitchen and destroyed the entire casino. Swanton hired William Henry Weeks to design a new Casino and the Plunge Natatorium pools. At the same time, a new Cottage City was built for guests. The new Casino, Plunge, and Cottage attracted many new guests to the Santa Cruz Beach Boardwalk by the end of 1907. The Cottage City was designed as a residential hotel for long summer stays, but there was a need for a regular hotel. The hotel was served by Horsecars that offered tram service starting in 1876. The Santa Cruz, Garfield Park, and Capitola Electric Railroad provided service in 1881. The Union Traction Company consolidated the three electric tram service routes in 1904. One service line ran from DeLaveaga Park along Water Street and Pacific Avenue to the beach. Another ran from Ocean Cliffs to the hotel along what would become CA Route 1. The third line through Seabright to Capitola was completed in 1906. With the increasing use of automobiles, the streetcar service ended in 1926. The Southern Pacific Railroad ran a summer excursion train, called the Suntan Special, between San Francisco and the hotel from 1927 to 1959. The ballroom in the Casino has hosted nightly bands and dances since its opening. In 1924, Isham Jones's band played jazz. In the 1930s and into the 1950s, Big Bands and jazz artists played, including: Artie Shaw, Ted Fio Rito, Lawrence Welk, Benny Goodman, Skinnay Ennis, Paul Whiteman, Billy May, Tex Beneke, Les Elgart, Hal McIntyre, and Si Zentner. In the 1960s, the ballroom featured artists such as Nat King Cole, Sonny and Cher, the New Christy Minstrels, and The Four Freshmen. From 1924 to 1965, the Miss California Pageant took place at the Casino's Boardwalk. Many movies and TV shows have been filmed on the Casino's Boardwalk, including: Sudden Impact, Mr. Peabody and the Mermaid, America Screams, and The Lost Boys.

=== Plunge Natatorium ===
Built in 1907 on the Santa Cruz Beach Boardwalk, the Plunge Natatorium was an indoor swimming pool that used heated Monterey Bay Pacific Ocean salt water. The main swimming pool was 144 feet by 64 feet and held 408,000 gallons. It was refilled and heated to 83 degrees each night. An added attraction was the Water Carnival which featured entertainment such as: Ruth Kahl, known as the human submarine, a world record holder for deep underwater swimming down to 303 feet; Dido Scettrini, Shirley Wightman, and Harry Murray, all human submarines; flying trapeze artists; fire divers; Stratosphere Plungers; water ballets; Duke Kahanamoku, an Olympic swimmer and surfer; fire dives; Don "Bosco" Patterson, a log zip line rider; swimming team races; and other exhibitions. Later called The Plunge or the Santa Cruz Swimming Pavilion, the Natatorium opened in 1907 and closed in 1963. A miniature golf course was built on the old site. After the remodel, some structural features of the old pool were still visible on the outer edges of the mini-golf course. After the 1989 Loma Prieta Earthquake, this mini-golf course was replaced with a new one, called Neptune's Kingdom

=== Casa Del Rey ===
In 1910, Swanton had a large resort hotel built. Across from the new Casino, architect George Applegarth designed and built the new 100,000 square feet, 300-room hotel. Some of the original cottages were kept. The hotel was built in the Spanish Colonial Revival architecture style with some Pueblo Revival architecture elements. A triple-arched pedestrian bridge crossed the street and railroad tracks. The hotel was 335 feet by 135 feet, with a phone in each room and elevators. The hotel had Italian gardens and a grand lobby, with access to a restaurant, tennis courts, and a bandstand. It also had its own rail and streetcar stop. The streetcar could take guests to the hotel's private golf course, now part of Pogonip park. The grand opening for the $500,000 (equivalent to $12.25 million in 2019) resort was held on May 1, 1911. The Santa Cruz Seaside Company was founded to run the resort in 1915. Visits by car increased when Glenwood Highway (Ca17) was paved in 1921. With more guests arriving, in 1926 the Seaside Company built the Casa del Rey Apartments, designed by architect William C. Hays. Casa del Rey Apartments were built in Spanish Revival style and had some ocean-view luxury suites. On March 31, 1928, the Casa Del Rey Spanish Gardens had its grand opening. Vera McKenna Clayton wrote original music for the opening. The Spanish Gardens were built where some of the old cottages had been removed. Casa Del Rey Spanish Gardens featured trees, flowers, bushes, a playground, and a glass solarium and opened with a Spanish café, a French café, and a tea pavilion. Management of the hotel changed in 1932, with J. Vance, Gifford L. Troyer, and W. C. Troyer running the hotel. The Casino's Bay Room ball became a conference center and entertainment stage.

== Naval Convalescent Hospital Santa Cruz ==
On March 9, 1943, the US Navy leased the hotel as a 500-bed Convalescent hospital for wounded war troops, known as Naval Convalescent Hospital Santa Cruz and also Naval Special Hospital, Santa Cruz. The Pacific War, having been fought for a little over a year, resulted in many Navy wounded. Frederick E. Porter, a retired Medical Corps Captain, was put in charge of the new hospital. The large pool was ideal for physical therapy. Over 18,000 service members received care at the hospital before it was closed on April 1, 1946. During the war, the Army's 963rd Amphibious Brigade used the Plunge for water safety training. About 700 men from Fort Ord camped at De Laveaga Park and trained at the Plunge.

== Post War ==
The hotel and apartments never returned to their pre-war glory. The apartments were sold by the Santa Cruz Seaside Company in 1944 to George Holland, then sold again in 1964 to Dr. Allegrini and renamed the La Bahia Apartments; they are still in use. In 1983, the Santa Cruz Seaside Company bought back the apartments and used them as University of California, Santa Cruz student housing. In 1942, many of the cottages were removed to create a parking lot. The pedestrian bridge was removed in 1952. In 1953, a restaurant workers' strike reduced attendance. The great December 1955 flood caused significant damage and further reduced attendance. In 1955, it rained from December 6 to December 23, causing widespread flooding. In 1956, more cottages (?) and the gardens were removed to create more parking. In the 1970s, the hotel was converted into a retirement home. The 1989 Loma Prieta earthquake caused serious damage, and the retirement home was demolished after 78 years of use. All the land is now a Santa Cruz Beach Boardwalk parking lot. The only remains of the grand resort are two large palm trees that were near the grand pedestrian bridge. The Casino building of 1907 survives, after several renovations, as the Cocoanut Grove event center, while the Plunge building now houses the Neptune's Kingdom entertainment complex and retail shops.

- A panoramic view of the Boardwalk from the pier, with Boardwalk's Coconut Grove on the left.
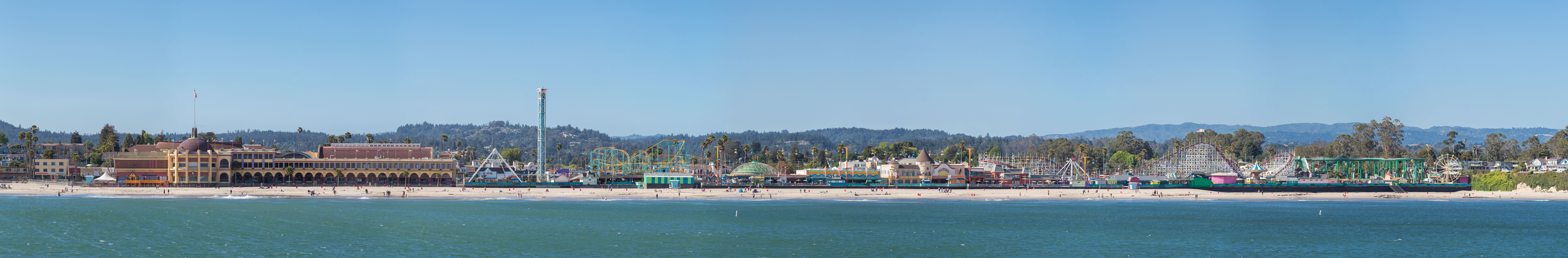

== See also ==
- California during World War II
