= Giant Dipper =

Giant Dipper may refer to:

- Giant Dipper (Santa Cruz Beach Boardwalk), a historic roller coaster in Santa Cruz
- Giant Dipper (Belmont Park), a historic roller coaster in San Diego
