= Santa Cruz Looff Carousel and Roller Coaster =

- Santa Cruz Loof Carousel and Roller Coaster
- U.S. National Register of Historic Places
- U.S. National Historic Landmark
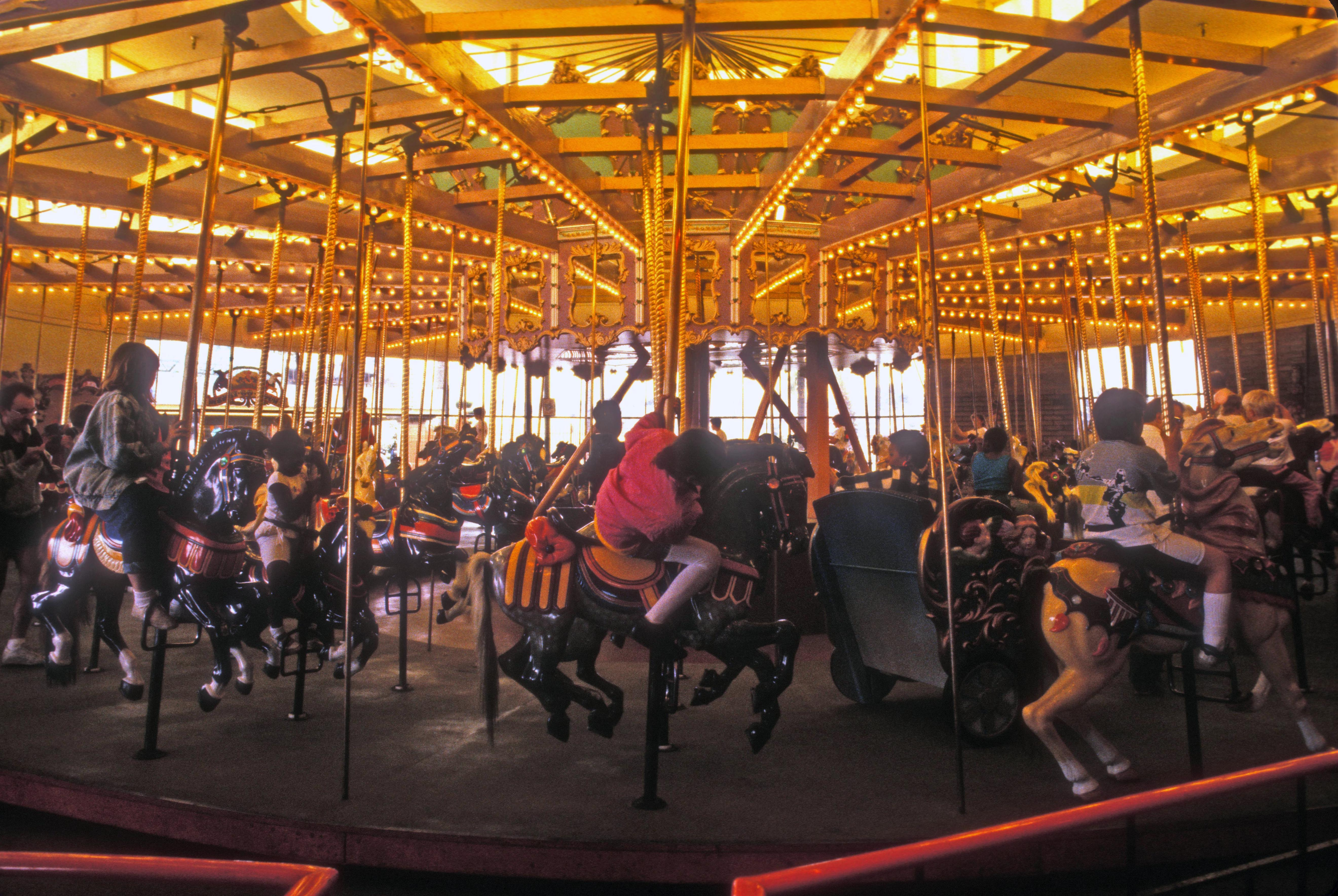

- Location within California Location within the United States
- Location: 400 Beach Street, Santa Cruz, California
- Coordinates: 36°57′53″N 122°0′56″W
- Area: 24 acres (9.7 ha)
- Built: 1911
- Architect: Charles I. D. Looff, Arthur Looff
- NRHP reference No.: 87000764

Significant dates
- Added to NRHP: February 27, 1987
- Designated NHL: February 24, 1987

Santa Cruz Looff Carousel and Roller Coaster On The Beach Boardwalk is a National Historic Landmark composed of two parts, a Looff carousel and the Giant Dipper wooden roller coaster, at the Santa Cruz Beach Boardwalk in Santa Cruz, California, United States. They are among the oldest surviving beachfront amusement park attractions on the west coast of the United States. They were listed as a pair as a National Historic Landmark in 1987.

== Background ==
The Santa Cruz Beach Boardwalk is located on the northern shore of Monterey Bay, south of Beach Street and just west of the mouth of the San Lorenzo River. The family-friendly amusement park was founded in 1907 by Fred W. Swanton, and has been in continuous operation since then. Early attractions included a natatorium, casino (in the old sense of the word, a place of entertainment), and a short railroad with hills. The Looff Carousel was purchased new from the Charles I. D. Looff factory in Long Beach, California in 1911, and the Giant Dipper rollercoaster followed in 1924. It was built by Charles Looff's son Arthur.

The Looff family was one of the major early manufacturers of carousels, including this 1911 example. Only five other intact Looff carousels remain in the United States. The Giant Dipper is the older of the two large, wooden scaffolded roller coasters remaining on the West Coast; the other is the Giant Dipper at Belmont Park in San Diego.

== Looff Carousel ==
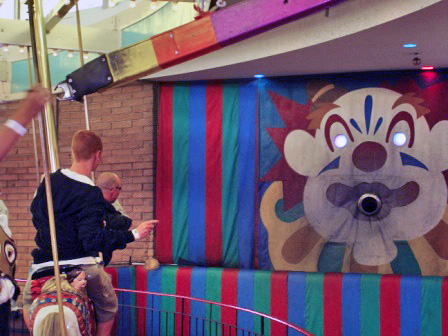
Brass ring dispenser and target on Santa Cruz Beach Boardwalk's Looff Carousel in Santa Cruz, California. The ring dispenser is visible as a mechanical arm crossing to the upper left, where a rider is grabbing the ring

The Looff Carousel is located near the Riverside Avenue entrance to the park. The carousel has 73 unique horses and two chariots or seats, and is a 'pure' carousel as all the horses were carved by one master carver. The Looff Carousel is one of six remaining intact in the United States.

The carousel includes a brass ring dispenser. Riders on the outside jumping horses can reach out and try to grab rings which then get tossed at the target which is a large clown's mouth. It was originally manually operated but was mechanized around 1950. It is one of only twenty ring dispensers still operating in the world. Sometimes, riders keep the rings to remember their visit.

The carousel also has three band organs: the original 342-pipe Ruth & Sohn band organ from 1894, a Wurlitzer 165 band organ from 2007, and a Wurlitzer 146 band organ from 2011.

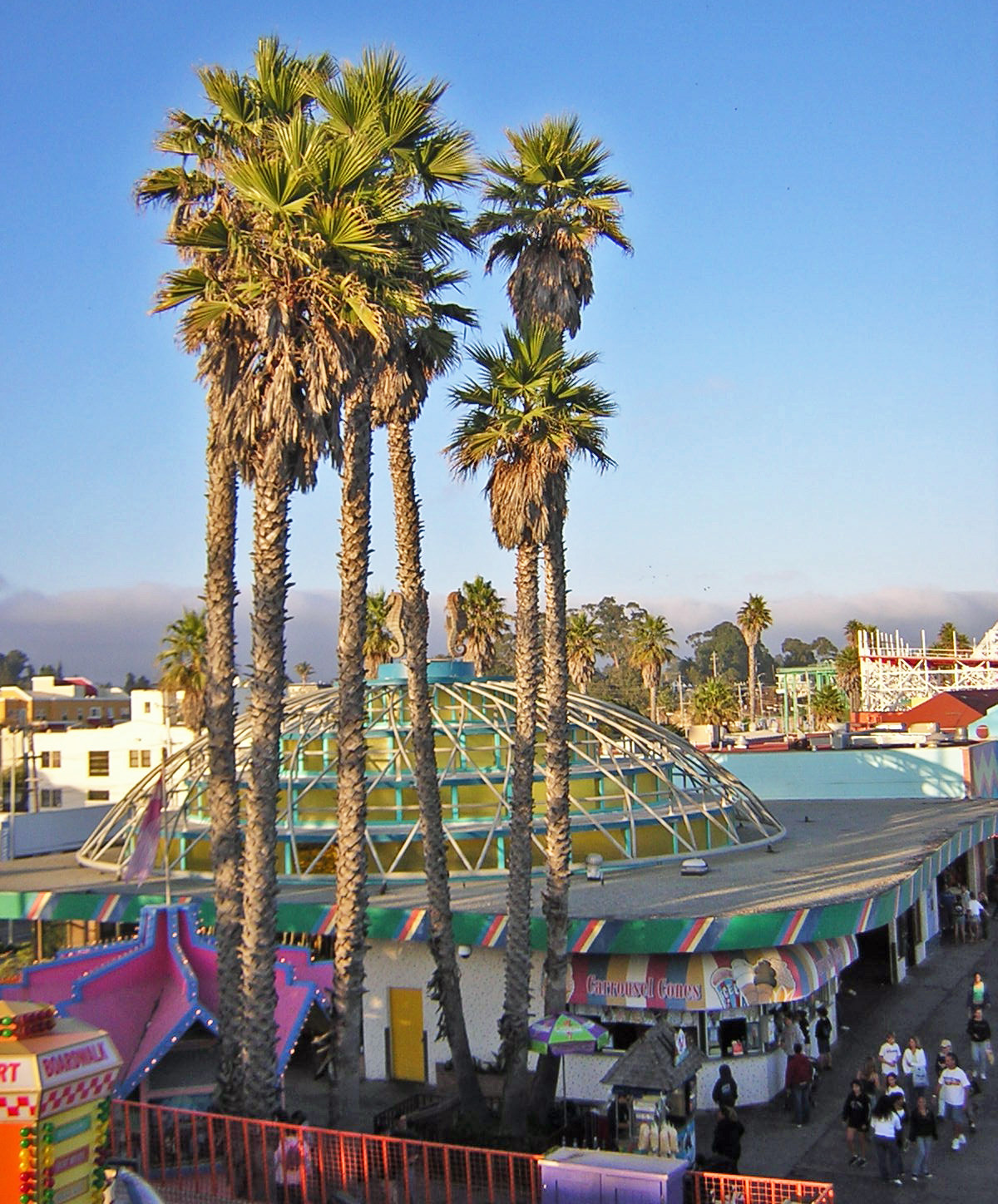
Roof of the Carousel

== Giant Dipper ==
The Giant Dipper is a classic wooden roller coaster, located astride the LeBrandt Avenue entrance to the park. It has a wooden track which is approximately 2,640 feet (800 m) in length, and the height of the lift is approximately 70 feet (21 m). The track is colored red with white supports. When built in 1924, 327,000 feet (100,000 m) of lumber was used. The track is inspected every two hours.

== See also ==
- Amusement rides on the National Register of Historic Places
- National Register of Historic Places listings in Santa Cruz County, California
- List of National Historic Landmarks in California
