= Jeanne Lenhart =

American volleyball player

- Born: 1945 or 1946 (age 80–81); San Diego, California, U.S.
- Education: San Diego State University
- Occupations: Teacher, amateur volleyball player
- Spouses: Tom Wright (divorced); Dan Kestly (divorced)

Jeanne Lenhart (born 1945, or 1946) American volleyball player, is a California Senior Olympian, Ms. Senior San Diego pageant winner and former performing arts high school teacher from San Diego, California.

== Early life and education ==
Lenhart grew up in Mission Beach and attended Mission Bay High School. She attended Mesa College for two years, where she played on the volleyball team and was a cheerleader. She then graduated from San Diego State University, majoring in physical education and playing on the Aztec women's volleyball team. She also holds a degree in Interior Design.

== Career ==
Lenhart taught dance at the San Diego School of Creative and Performing Arts and coached gymnastics at San Diego High School. She is a faculty member of the San Diego Dance Theater.

She was named Ms. Senior San Diego 2012 at its February 2012 pageant. She won first runner up in March 2013 in the Ms. Senior Inland Empire 2013, advancing to the state pageant to compete for the 2013 title of Ms. Senior California. She was named 4th runner up in the Ms. Senior California Pageant in Westminster on August 31, 2013.

Since 2012, she has been a cast member in the annual theater performance of Senior Follies at the Lincoln Performing Arts Center in San Diego.

Lenhart opened an interior design business, Mission Design, in 1993.

=== Athletics ===
In 1964, she won the title Miss Surf in a surfing competition and Miss Quivira Basin in a sailing race.

In 1997, she placed 1st in women's beach volleyball in the California Senior Olympics.

In 2012, her volleyball team placed 2nd in the 2013 USA Volleyball Open Championships in the Women’s 65 and Over category. Also in 2012, she competed in the US Open Nationals.

Lenhart has twice won Old Mission Beach Athletic Club's annual Over-the-Line tournament in the Women's Open Division. She has also won the two-person beach volleyball tournament in Estero Beach, Ensenada, Mexico in the women's category.

She described herself in August 2013 on KUSI's "Good Morning San Diego" as a lifelong exercise enthusiast.

== Honors ==
In October 2013 Mesa College officials launched the school's 50th anniversary with Lenhart as the alumni honoree (class of ’66).

== Personal life ==
Her grandfather, Robert Hogg, was a conductor and a founder of the first orchestra at Balboa Theatre in downtown San Diego. Her brother, Jeff Lenhart, is a competitive sailor on U.S. sailing teams.

For 60 years, on her birthday, she has ridden the Giant Dipper Roller Coaster in Mission Beach to commemorate the day.

Lenhart lives in Pacific Beach, a coastal neighborhood of San Diego.
