= Vera McKenna Clayton =

American music teacher (1896–1978)

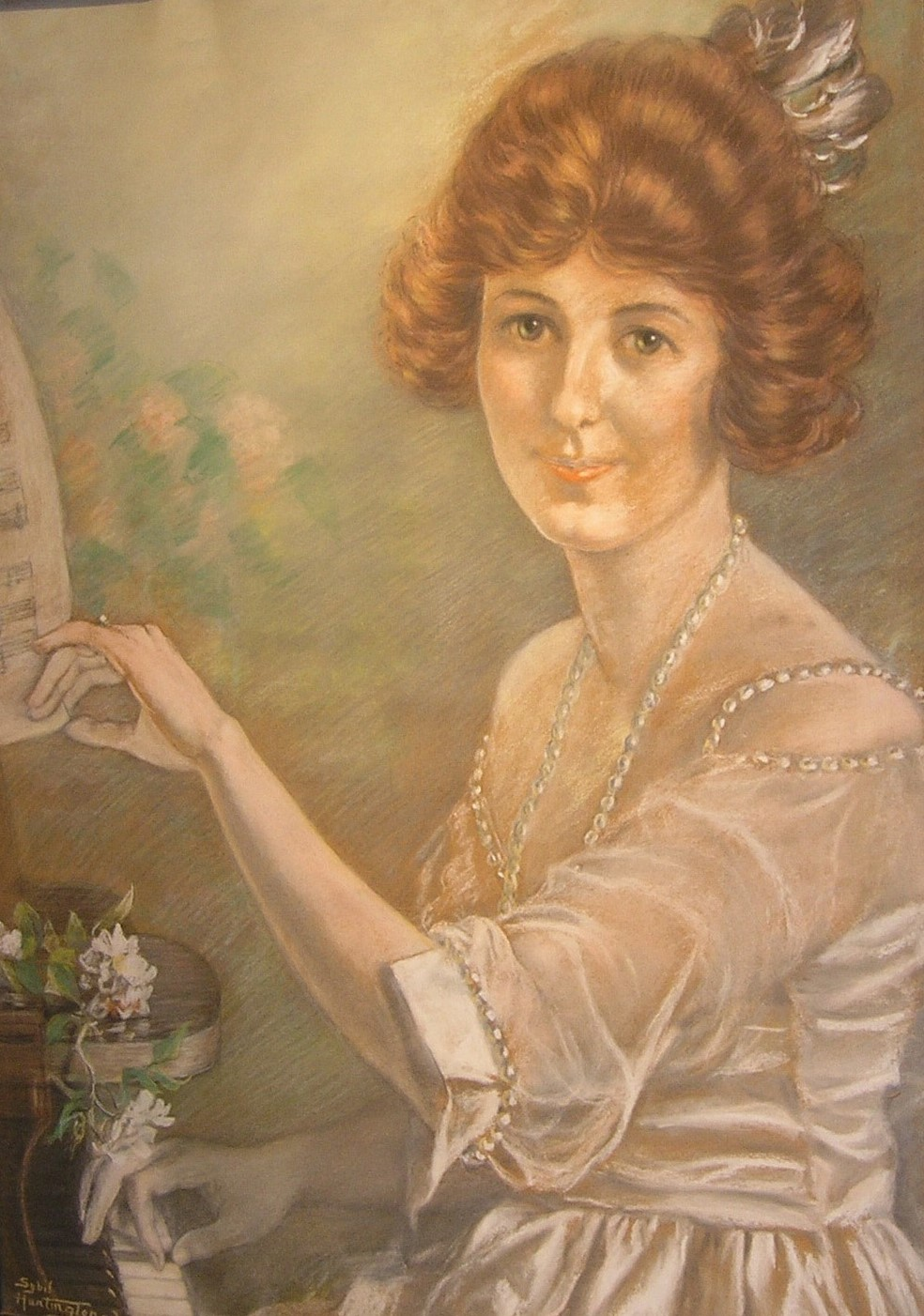
Sybil Hunington, Vera at the Piano, pastel on paper

Vera McKenna Clayton (née Vera McKenna; February 18, 1896 – October 6, 1978) was an American music teacher, clubwoman, and community member in Santa Cruz from the 1920s to the 1950s.

== Early life ==
Vera McKenna was born in Oakland, California, on February 18, 1896, the daughter of James J. McKenna (1870–1909) and Nancy Ann Laughton (1871–1940). She had one sister, Melba McKenna (1904–1989).

== Career ==
Vera McKenna Clayton was very active in all community affairs. She was chair of County Federation of Women’s clubs in music, Accompanist for Kiwanis, Exchange and High Service Clubs, Santa Cruz Male Chorus, the Elks Lodge, and the Monday Musical Club, Music Chairman for Better Homes Week.

She was a composer, teacher and concert accompanist; she taught music since 1913; she was an organist and director for the First Methodist Episcopal Church; she was director of the choir at the church with her sister in the choir. In 1928 she composed the Spanish influenced melody entitled "Senorita Mia" for the grand opening of the Spanish Gardens at Casa del Rey Hotel and "Floating Down the San Lorenzo River" for the 1928 Santa Cruz Water Pageant. In 1929 she composed the 160th birthday song for the City of Santa Cruz.

She was a member of the Monday Musical Club and the Santa Cruz Woman's Club. She was President of the Saturday Afternoon Club and the MacDowell Club.

During World War II she briefly moved to San Francisco and become a clerk typist.

== Personal life ==
A former resident of Reno, Nevada, Vera McKenna Clayton moved to California in 1923 and lived at 157 Broadway Ave., Santa Cruz, California.

In 1921 she married Donald Barr Clayton (1895–1978).

She died on October 6, 1978, and is buried at Santa Cruz Memorial Park in Santa Cruz.

== Legacy ==
The Vera McKenna Clayton Scrapbook Collection is at the Santa Cruz Museum of Art and History.
