= Mission Beach, San Diego =

- Community of San Diego
- Mission Beach
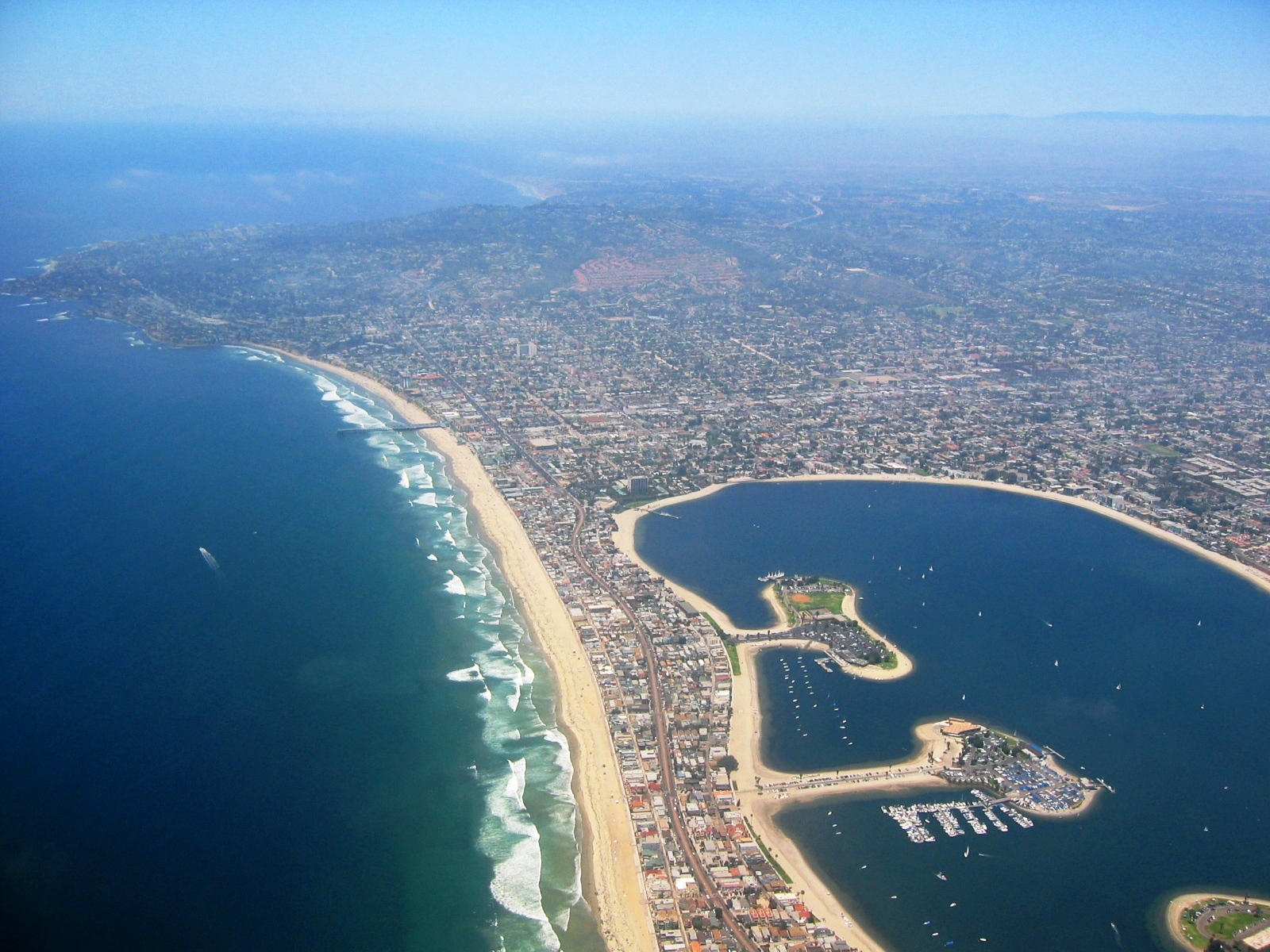
- Mission Beach in the foreground

- Location within Central San Diego Mission Beach, San Diego (California) Mission Beach, San Diego (the United States)
- Coordinates: 32.776389°N 117.2525°W
- Country: United States of America
- State: California
- County: San Diego
- City: San Diego
- Postal code: 92109
- Website: VisitSanDiego.us – Explore top San Diego attractions, beaches, and guides

Mission Beach is a community built on a sandbar between the Pacific Ocean and Mission Bay. It is part of the city of San Diego, California.

Mission Beach spans nearly two miles of ocean front. It is bounded by the San Diego River estuary on the south, Mission Bay Park on the east, and the community of Pacific Beach on the north. A boardwalk runs along the beaches on both the ocean and bay sides of the community. The main artery through Mission Beach is Mission Boulevard. The community is divided into South Mission and North Mission. At the south end of the beach on the ocean side is a jetty; on the bay side is a park with grass, parking and a walking path.

== Land ==
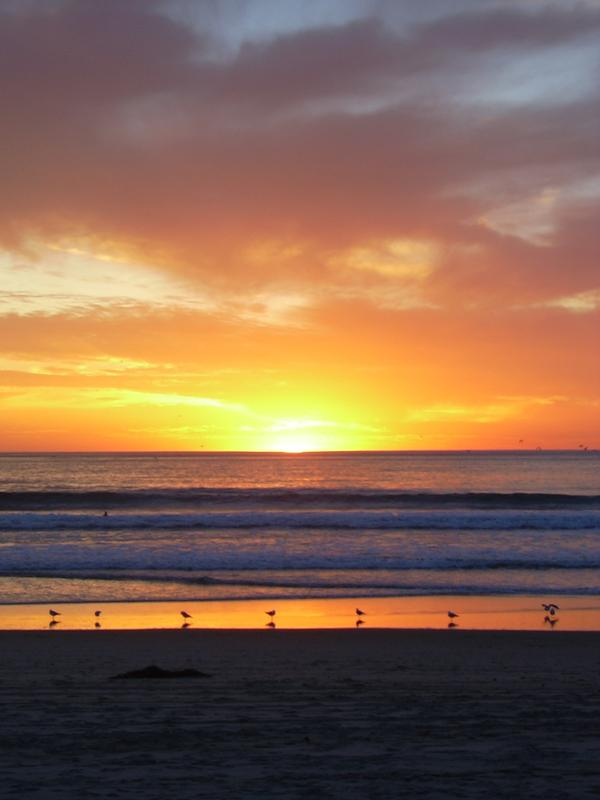
Mission Beach sunset

Many residential structures in Mission Beach were built in the 1930s and '40s as summer cottages and some date as early as the 1920s. The rare airplane bungalow on Manhattan Court was built in 1924. Because of problems to work out with developing on sand, Mission Beach developed later than the neighboring communities of Ocean Beach to the south and Pacific Beach to the north. As a result of a new official subdivision in 1914, encouraged by land sales in those next-door communities and a new wooden bridge linking Mission Beach with Ocean Beach, John D. Spreckels offered small lots for sale. As a result, Mission Beach is the most densely developed residential community in San Diego with a land use designation across the majority of its land area of 36 dwelling units per acre. It also has the smallest lots in the city, ranging from 1,250 square feet (116 m^{2}) to 2,400 square feet (220 m^{2}). Few have been consolidated to form larger lots. Many of the structures within the community have been redeveloped into two-story homes. The wooden bridge to Ocean Beach was closed to traffic in 1950 and demolished in 1951.

== History ==
Attractions near Mission Beach include SeaWorld in Mission Bay Park and the historic amusement park Belmont Park in South Mission Beach. Belmont Park was originally built as the Mission Beach Amusement Center by John D. Spreckels in 1925 to stimulate real estate sales and to promote his electric railway. Belmont Park now features the original wooden Giant Dipper Roller Coaster as well as newer rides such as the FlowRider at Wave House, Vertical Plunge, Krazy Kars, Tilt-a-Whirl, Liberty Carousel, Crazy Submarine, The Beach Blaster, and The Chaos.

Designed by architect Frank Walter Stevenson, The Mission Beach Plunge in Belmont Park, a 60-foot (18 m)-by-175-foot (53 m) saltwater swimming pool, opened in May 1925 as the Natatorium. The Plunge building enclosing the pool was styled after the Spanish Renaissance architecture of San Diego's Balboa Park structures. The changing rooms appear in the Tom Cruise film Top Gun. Celebrities who once swam at the Plunge include Esther Williams and Johnny Weissmuller. The roof of the building rolled open to make it both an indoor and outdoor pool. The Mission Beach Plunge (now using fresh water) and the Giant Dipper are the only remaining attractions left from Spreckels' original park; the other structures were razed in the late 1980s. The Plunge was saved from demolition after the Save Mission Beach Plunge Committee of residents put a measure to save the pool on the ballot, which was approved unanimously in 1987 by San Diego voters. The Plunge closed in 2014 because of disrepair. Plans to rebuild the Plunge were approved in January 2016. The pool reopened in July 2019.

=== Landfill ===
Also nearby, immediately east of SeaWorld, is an unlined landfill. From 1957 to 1962 large amounts of industrial waste, including millions of gallons of chromic, hydrofluoric, nitric, sulfuric, and hydrochloric acids, dichromate, cyanide, and carbon tetrachloride, were deposited into this landfill. No remediation efforts have occurred.

== Activities ==
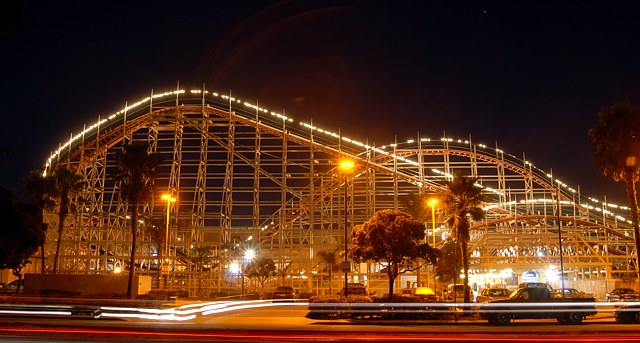
Mission Beach roller coaster

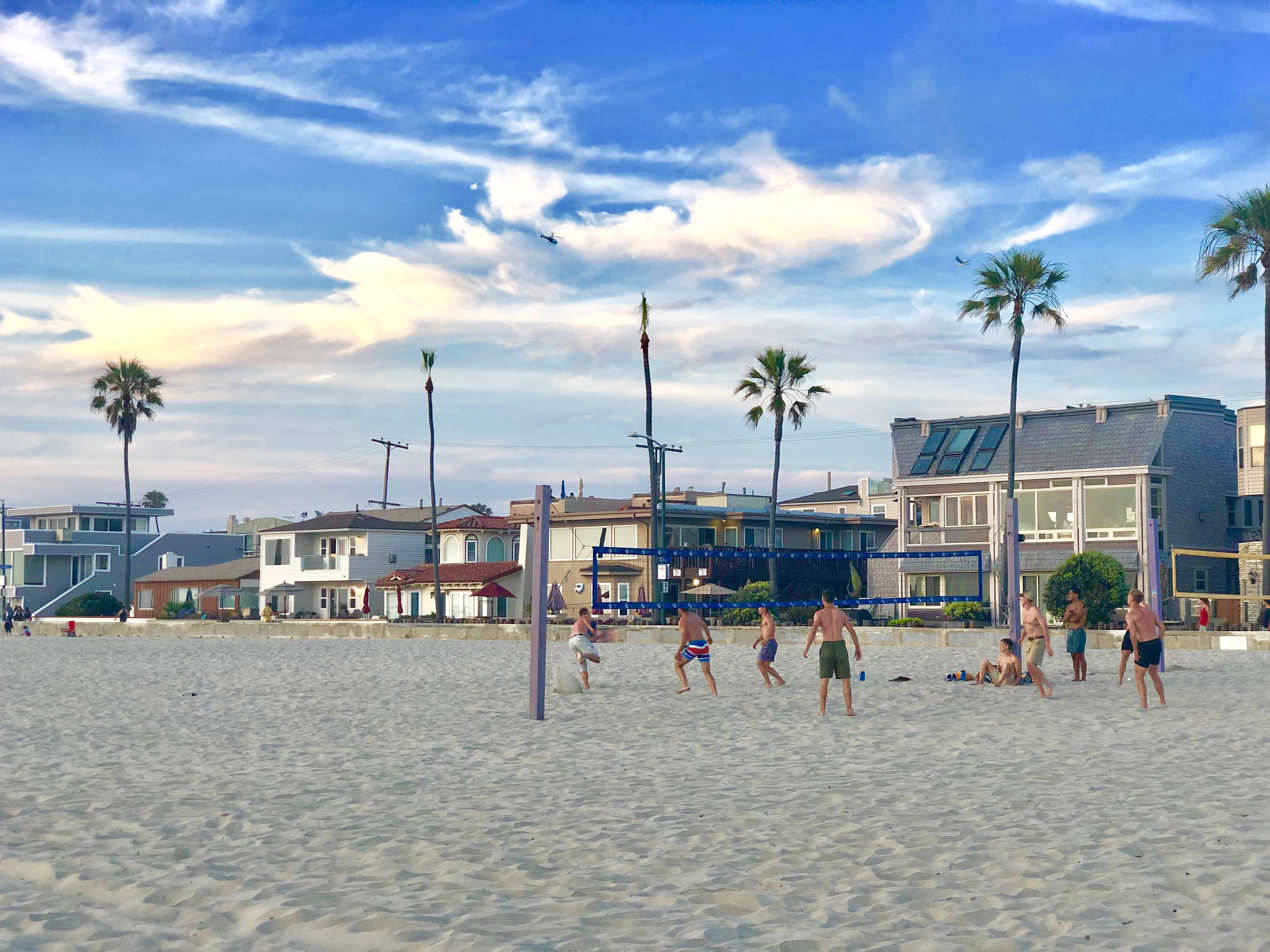
Beach volleyball at Mission Beach

Mission Beach offers opportunities to participate in sunbathing, horseshoes, surfing, bicycling, skateboarding, Frisbee tossing, and other outdoor activities. A local skating club, "Skate This!," performs for free on weekends, executing trick skating and dancing on both rollerblades and traditional skates. It is a well known, popular location for engaging in sports, including beach volleyball and basketball, with courts available for both.

There is a public recreation center on Santa Clara Place on the bay side of Mission Beach. At the south end of Belmont Park is the Wave House Athletic Club, a full-service beachside fitness center, complete with cardio equipment, weights, fitness classes, aquatic classes in the Plunge, and beach Bootcamps.

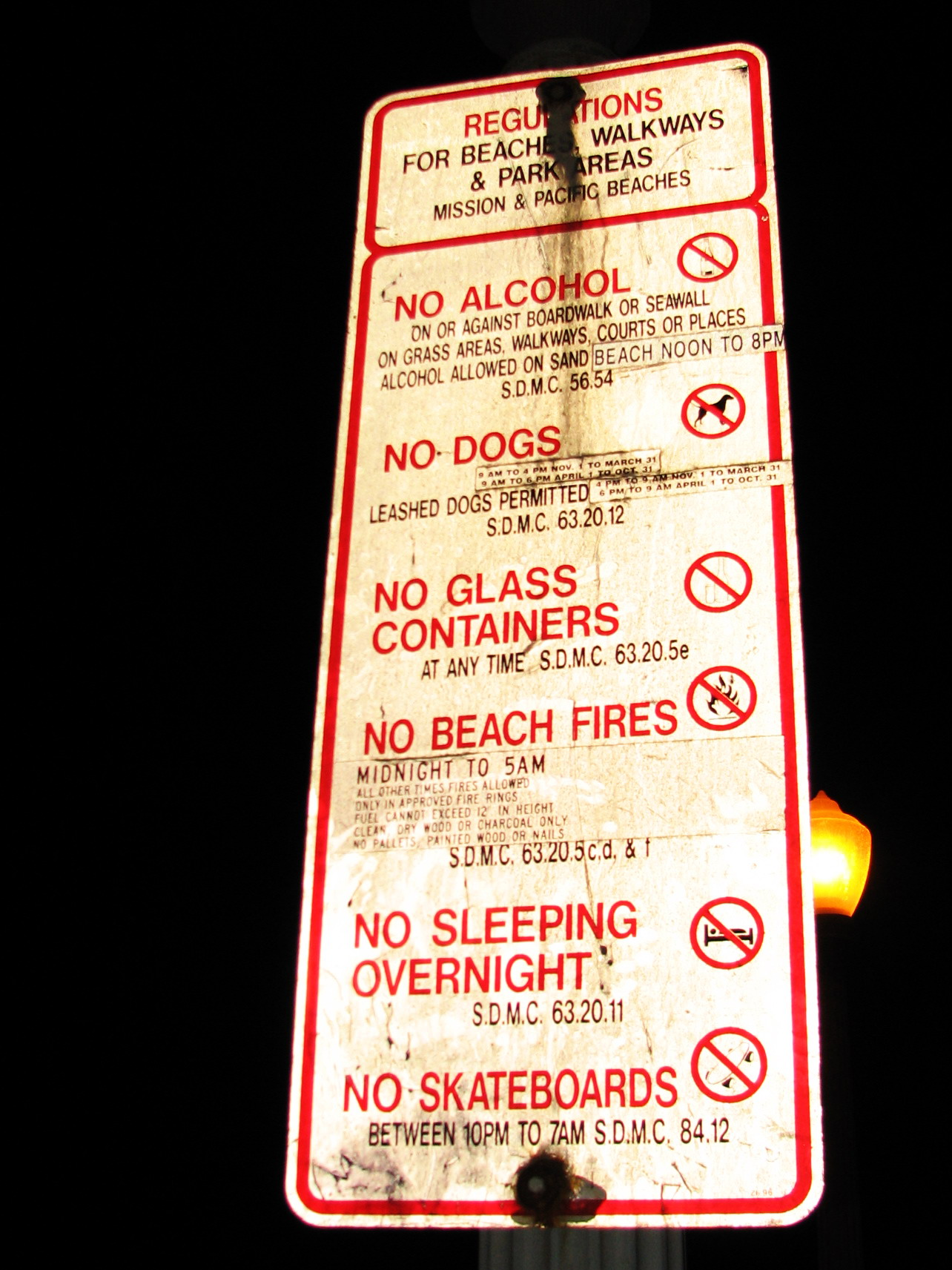
Mission Beach regulations

Mission Beach includes Mariner's Point, the original site of the over-the-line softball-on-the-beach tournament.

Thong bikinis are technically illegal on Mission Beach, but lifeguards and local police do not typically enforce the ban on such swimwear. The consumption of alcoholic beverages on the beach is illegal as of April 2008. Nudity is not allowed.

Many beachgoers are local college and university students, but both tourists and permanent residents of the beach and other areas are also frequent visitors to the beach. Weekly and monthly rentals are available during the summer months.

== Notable people ==
- David C. Copley, billionaire, former publisher of San Diego Union-Tribune newspaper
- Mike Gotch, former San Diego City Councilman and California state assemblyman
- Jeanne Lenhart, California Senior Olympian, amateur volleyball player, senior pageant winner
- Bob Mendoza, professional baseball player and coach, San Diego Hall of Champions inductee
- Dorian "Doc" Paskowitz (1921–2014), surfer and physician
- Cathy Scott, true crime author
- Curtis Casella, founder of Taang! Records

== See also ==
- List of beaches in San Diego County

| To the North: Pacific Beach, San Diego | California beaches | To the South; Ocean Beach, San Diego |

| To the north: Pacific Beach | California beaches | To the south: Ocean Beach |
