= Santa Cruz Wharf =

Pier in Santa Cruz, California

Coordinates: 36.961491°N 122.021868°W

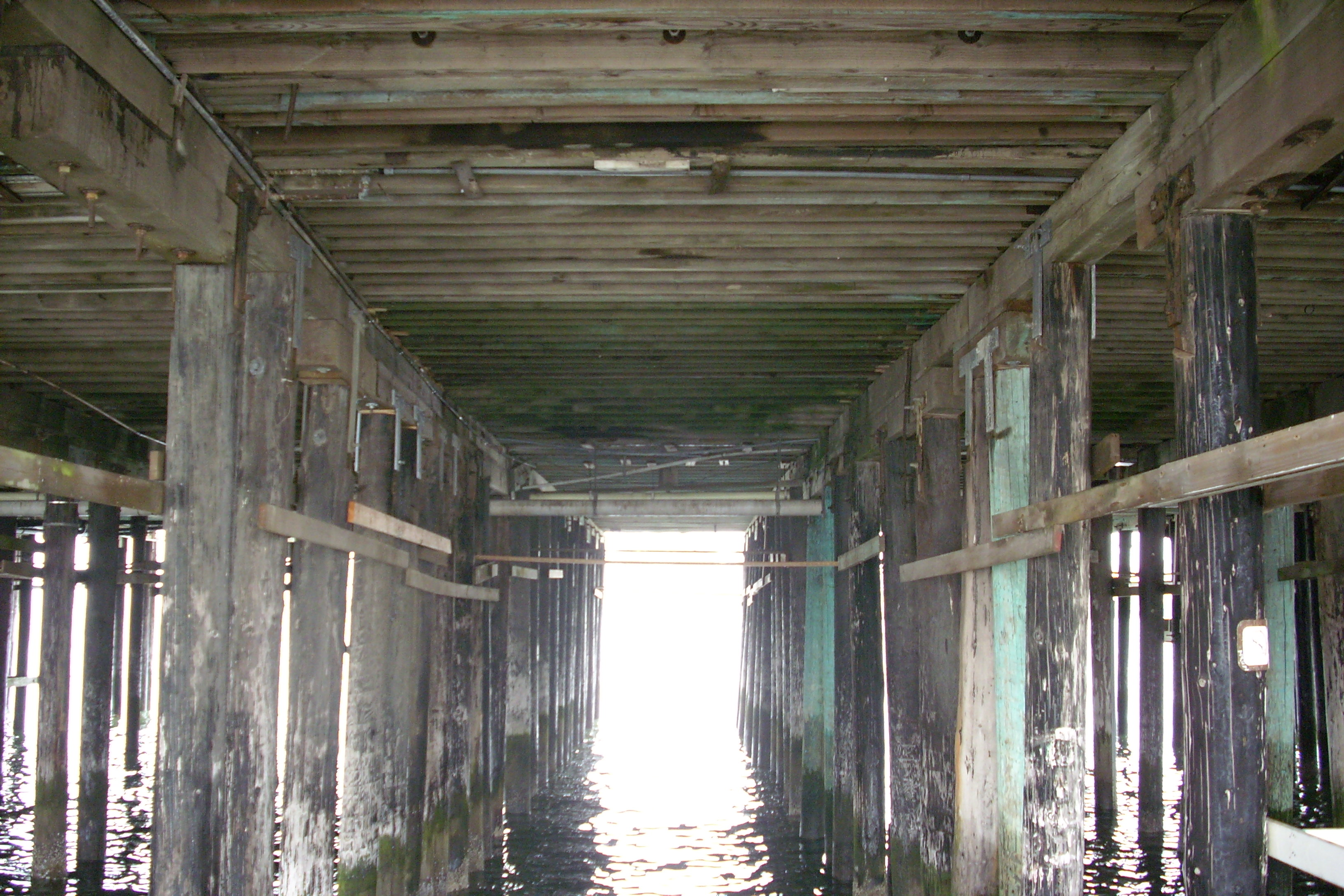
View underneath the wharf between wooden piles

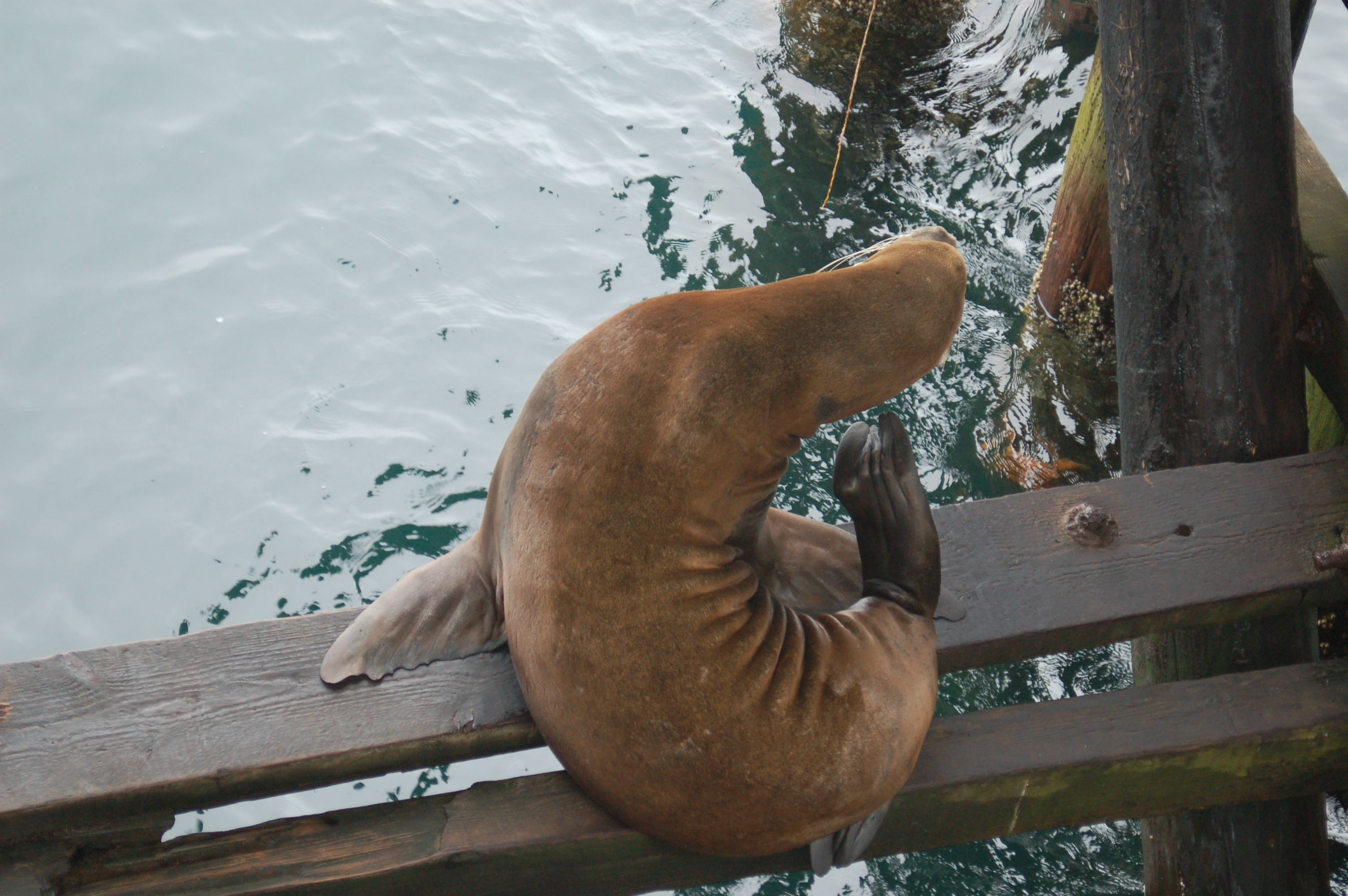
Sea lion under the wharf

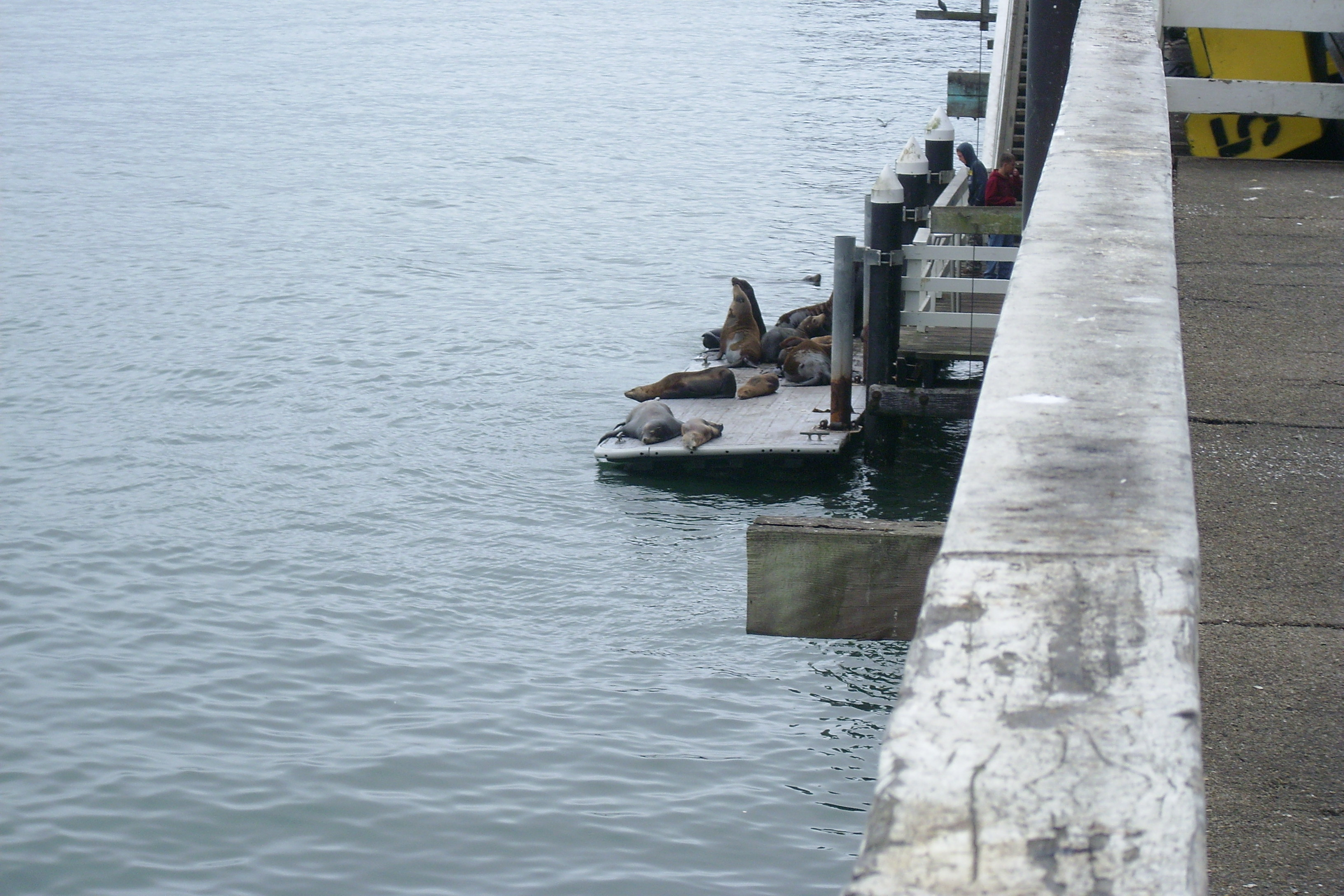
Sea lions on a platform beside the wharf

The Santa Cruz Wharf is a pier in Santa Cruz, California, United States, known for fishing, boat tours, viewing sea lions, dining, nightlife and gift shops. The current wharf was built in 1914, the most recent of six built on the site, and is operated by the City of Santa Cruz Parks and Recreation Office. The wharf is situated between Main Beach (which is adjacent to the Santa Cruz Beach Boardwalk) and Cowell's Beach, on the westside of the city of Santa Cruz. With a length of 2,745 feet (836.68 m) before the 2024 storm damage, it was the longest pier on the West Coast of the United States.

== History ==
The Santa Cruz Wharf opened on December 5, 1914. The original purpose of building the wharf was for shipping potatoes to San Francisco for mining camps in the Sierra Nevada during the Gold Rush. After the opening of the South Pacific Coast Railroad and the improvement of land routes through the Santa Cruz Mountains, the Wharf's primary focus changed to be the base of the north Monterey Bay fishing industry. By the 1950s as Monterey Bay's sardine and other fish populations dwindled, nearly every family owned a vehicle and had money to spend on recreation. As a result, the Santa Cruz Wharf became predominantly a recreational destination.

On October 4, 2014, the community celebrated 100 years of the Santa Cruz Wharf with a festival including a pop-up museum exhibit, historic photo stand, bocce courts, face painting, Mavericks surfboard display, photo booth, Economic Development's Wharf Master Plan model and the Surfing Preservation Society's surf shack. The festivities ended with fireworks.

In late October 2014, city council approved an improvement plan, subject to environmental review, hoping to find grant money to offset some of the estimated $24-29 million in repairs and improvements.

In fall 2020, a group called "Don't Morph the Wharf", led by Gillian Greensite, demanded changes in the updated plan, including lower building heights and removal of a western walkway and new Landmark Building. The council approved the plan on November 24, 2020. Greensite's group sued the City under the California Environmental Quality Act (CEQA), claiming the Environmental Impact Report was done improperly. The City was unable to secure state or federal grant money with the case in litigation, leading to further delays in improving and strengthening the wharf.

High surf in December 2023 damaged the wharf, forcing the temporary closure of the entire structure and leading to the demolition of a restaurant at its end. On December 23, 2024, an approximately 150-foot (46 m) section at the end of the wharf collapsed due to high waves. The wharf had accumulated a backlog of necessary repairs prior to the collapse, but engineers were unable to implement the repairs due to CEQA lawsuits. During the collapse, one city project manager and two contractors fell into the ocean together with equipment, two of whom were rescued while the third swam to shore. The public restroom building was washed up onto the beach. With the loss of some 300 pilings, debris washed up as far as 10 miles (16 km) away. The pier, along with the businesses on it, was closed for inspection of the damage. The pier reopened January 4, 2025, after it was determined the lost equipment did not pose a danger to the structure.

== Description and events ==
The wharf is a popular tourist attraction, nestled adjacent to the city's leading attraction, Santa Cruz Beach Boardwalk. Visitors flock to the wharf for a variety of restaurants, gift shops, wine tasting, candy stores, and just to stroll and peer down at the sea lions below. Annually, an estimated 1.5 million visitors come to the Santa Cruz Wharf to fish, shop, dine and sightsee.

=== Woodies on the Wharf ===
The Surf City Classic "Woodies on the Wharf" is Northern California's largest woodie show that features more than 200 stylish, pre-1952 wood-bodied cars. A free bike valet is available.

=== Wharf to Wharf ===
First run in 1973 by a handful of locals, the Wharf to Wharf Race begins at the Santa Cruz Wharf and completes at the Capitola Wharf, in the neighboring town. Limited to 16,000 runners on a first-come-first-served basis, its field sells out months in advance. Each year, on the fourth Sunday in July, thousands of runners return for the 6-mile race (9.7 km) to Capitola-by-the-Sea.

== Popular culture ==
A fish market on the wharf is featured in scenes from the film Sudden Impact (1983). A restaurant on the wharf is seen in The Lost Boys (1987).

== See also ==
- Casa del Rey Hotel
