= Giant Dipper (Santa Cruz Beach Boardwalk) =

Roller coaster at Santa Cruz Beach Boardwalk

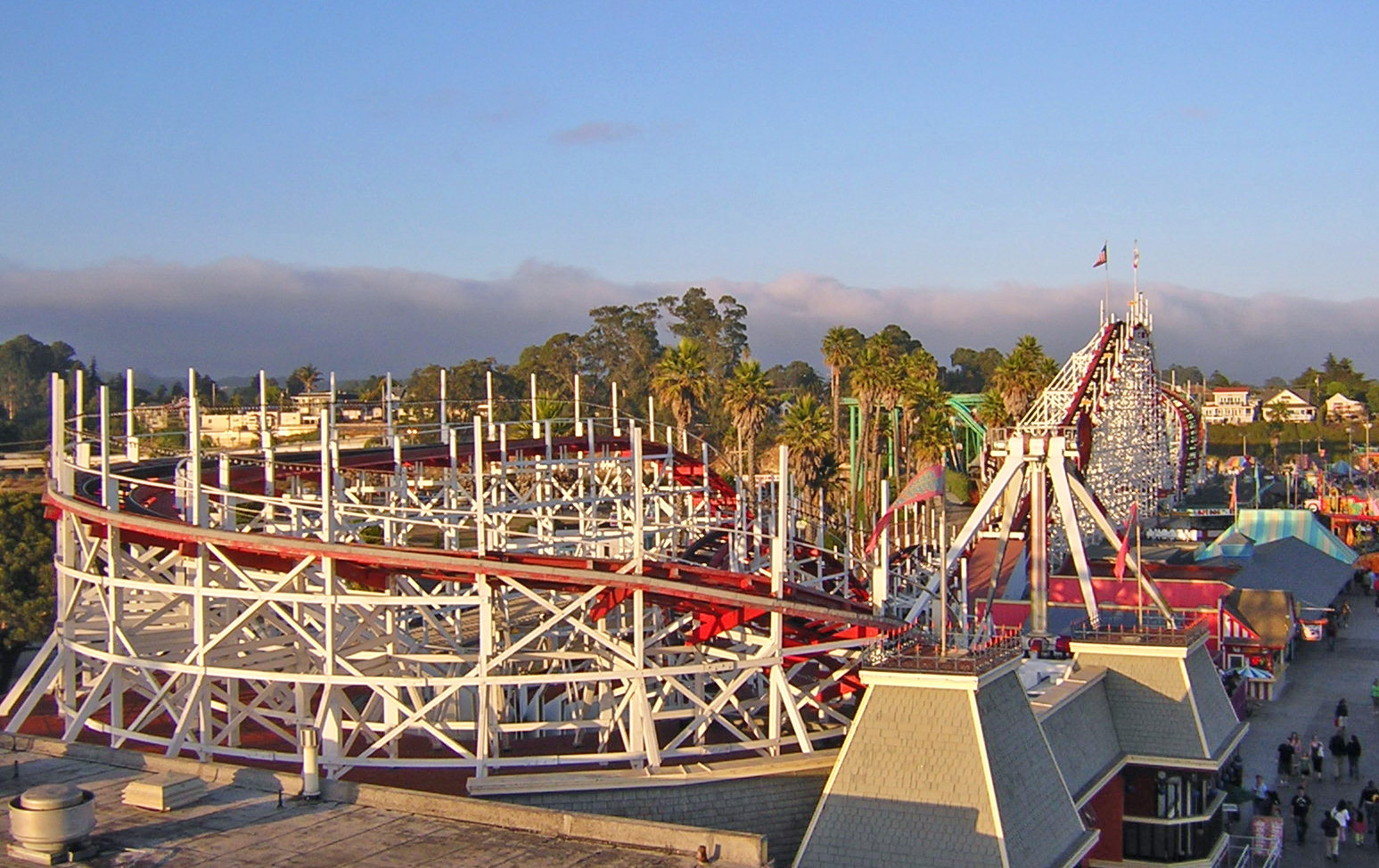
- View of Giant Dipper from the Skyglider

Santa Cruz Beach Boardwalk
- Location: Santa Cruz Beach Boardwalk
- Coordinates: 36°57′53″N 122°00′55″W
- Status: Operating
- Opening date: May 17, 1924
- Cost: $50,000

U.S. National Historic Landmark
- Designated: 1987
- Part of: Santa Cruz Looff Carousel and Roller Coaster
- Reference no.: 87000764

General statistics
- Type: Wood
- Manufacturer: Arthur Looff
- Designer: Frank Prior, Frederick Church
- Track layout: Double Out and Back
- Lift/launch system: Chain lift hill
- Height: 70 ft (21 m)
- Drop: 65 ft (20 m)
- Length: 2,640 ft (800 m)
- Speed: 55 mph (89 km/h)
- Inversions: 0
- Duration: 1:52
- Height restriction: 50 in (127 cm)
- Trains: 2 trains with 6 cars; riders arranged 2 across in 2 rows for a total of 24 riders per train
- Giant Dipper at RCDB

The Giant Dipper is a historic wooden roller coaster located at Santa Cruz Beach Boardwalk in Santa Cruz, California, United States. Designed by renowned coaster architects Frank Prior and Frederick Church, it was built during the Golden Age of roller coasters and officially opened on May 17, 1924. The Giant Dipper replaced Thompson's Scenic Railway and was constructed in just 47 days at a cost of $50,000. The ride stands 70 feet (21 m) tall and reaches a maximum speed of 55 mph (89 km/h).

In addition to being one of the oldest operating roller coasters in the world, it remains one of the most popular, ranking consistently among the top 50 wooden coasters in the annual Golden Ticket Awards published by Amusement Today. Giant Dipper has accommodated over 68 million riders and was designated a National Historic Landmark in 1987. It was also awarded an ACE Roller Coaster Landmark designation by American Coaster Enthusiasts in 2007.

== History ==
Thompson's Scenic Railway at Santa Cruz Beach Boardwalk opened in 1908 as the longest roller coaster in the United States. In 1923, manager R.L. Cardiff and Walter Looff decided to replace the Scenic Railway and began planning its replacement by October. The budget was set at $50,000, which was $15,000 more than the cost to build Scenic Railway. The permit to build Giant Dipper was granted in January 1924 to Arthur Looff, who wanted to create a ride that had "the thrill of a plunge down a mine shaft, a balloon ascent, a parachute jump, airplane acrobatics, a cyclone, a toboggan ride, and a ship in a storm." Demolition of the Scenic Railway began soon after the permit was issued. Construction of Giant Dipper took just 47 days, although the overall project – including demolition of the Scenic Railway – spanned five months. It officially opened to the public on May 17, 1924.

Frank Prior and Frederick Church designed Giant Dipper. Construction was helmed by Arthur Looff, and it required 327,000 feet (100,000 m) of lumber, 743,000 nails, and 24,000 bolts. The lumber was provided by Homer T. Maynard Lumber, and the 70 horsepower motor – still in use on the ride – was provided by Santa Cruz Electric. The concrete work was executed by T.F. Costello, and the steel was provided by Berger and Carter.

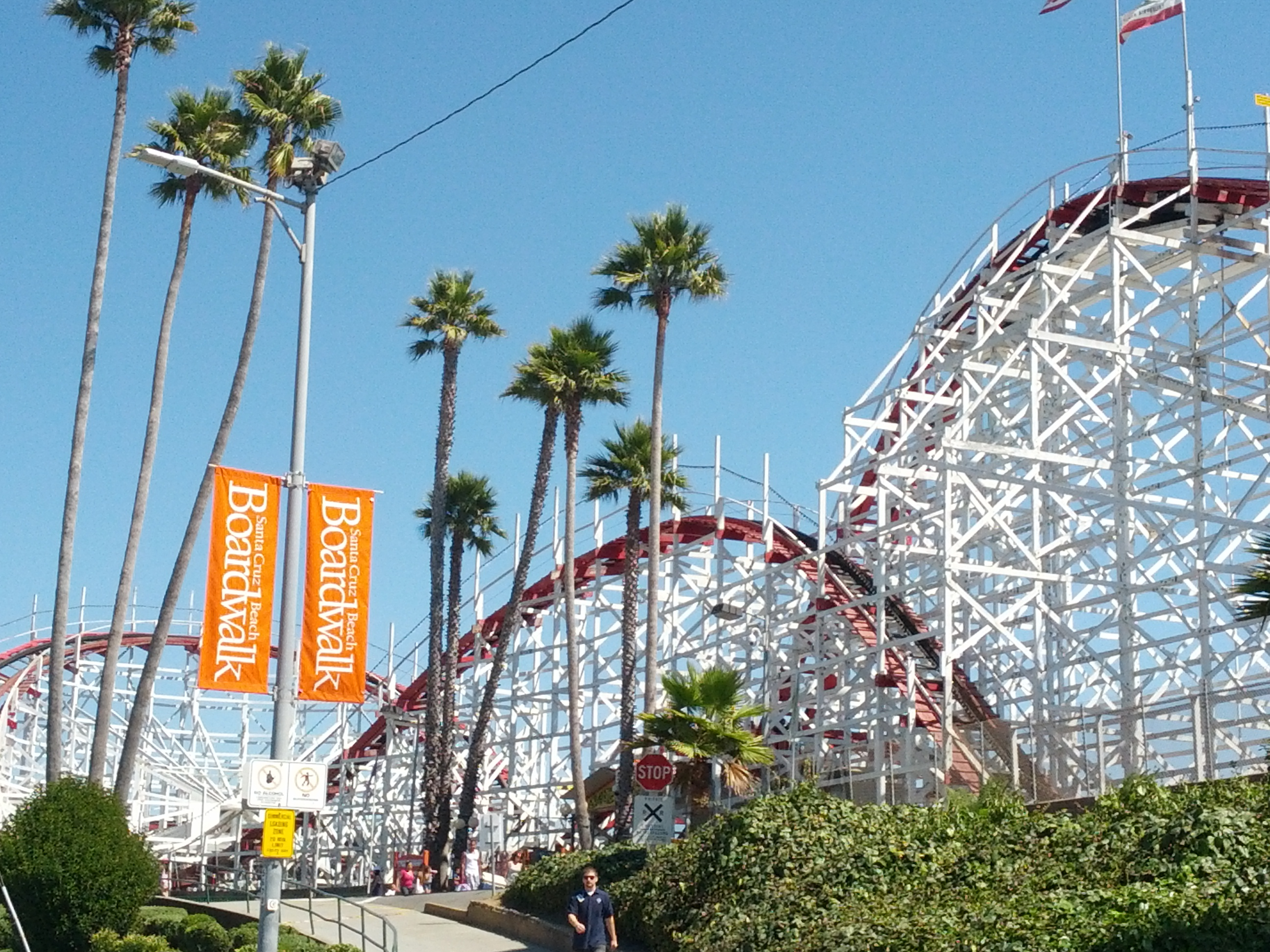
View of Giant Dipper (2012)

In 1974, the ride received a new coat of paint with Victorian-style architecture around the station. In the 1989 Loma Prieta earthquake, the Giant Dipper was practically untouched. The ride was closed for about a month to be inspected. The park held a benefit for victims of the earthquake. In 2002, the ride celebrated its 50 millionth rider. Ten years after the 50 millionth rider, the park celebrated the Giant Dipper's 60 millionth rider on July 27, 2012. The park gave out trivia coasters leading up to the event. The 24 riders that were on the train when it hit 60 million riders received a hoodie among other prizes.

=== Incidents ===
The ride has experienced several major incidents over the years in which three people died. In 1924, four months after the ride debuted, a 15-year-old boy fell from the ride while standing up near the end. Although the emergency brake was applied, the boy fell head first onto the track and was crushed by the coaster train. Two additional fatal accidents occurred in 1940 and 1970. Several modifications have been made to the trains as a result.

== Ride description ==
The wooden track is 2,640 feet (800 m) in length, and the height of the lift hill is 70 feet (21 m). The track features a red and white color scheme, with the track painted red and the supports painted white. When built in 1924, 327,000 feet (100,000 m) of lumber was used. During normal operation, the track is inspected every two hours.

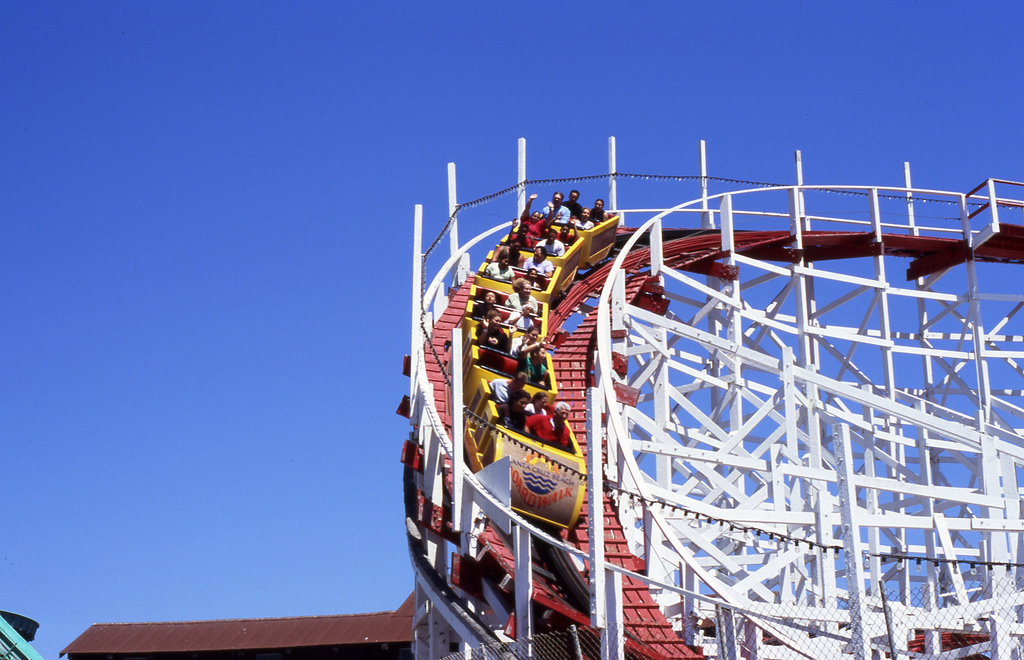
Giant Dipper's yellow train (2005)

When the Giant Dipper first opened in 1924, it ran with three trains, each with ten cars. Over the years, the trains have been redesigned and replaced several times, with the latest being the third iteration. The Giant Dipper was later changed to operate with two trains built by Dana Morgan from D.H. Morgan Manufacturing, each with six cars, with riders arranged two across in two rows for a total of 24 riders per train.

For the track layout, the train departs from the station and immediately enters a tunnel. After a few drops and turns in the tunnel, the train emerges at the base of the lift hill. Upon reaching the top of 70 feet (21 m) lift hill, the train drops 65 feet (20 m), reaching a top speed of 55 miles per hour (89 km/h). The train then rises up into a banked turn to the left. Riders then go through two hills next to the lift hill followed by a turnaround that is positioned over the tunnel at the beginning of the ride. The train then travels over three small hills situated next to the lift hill followed by another turnaround. Riders then go through three more small hills and enter the final brake run.

== Reception ==
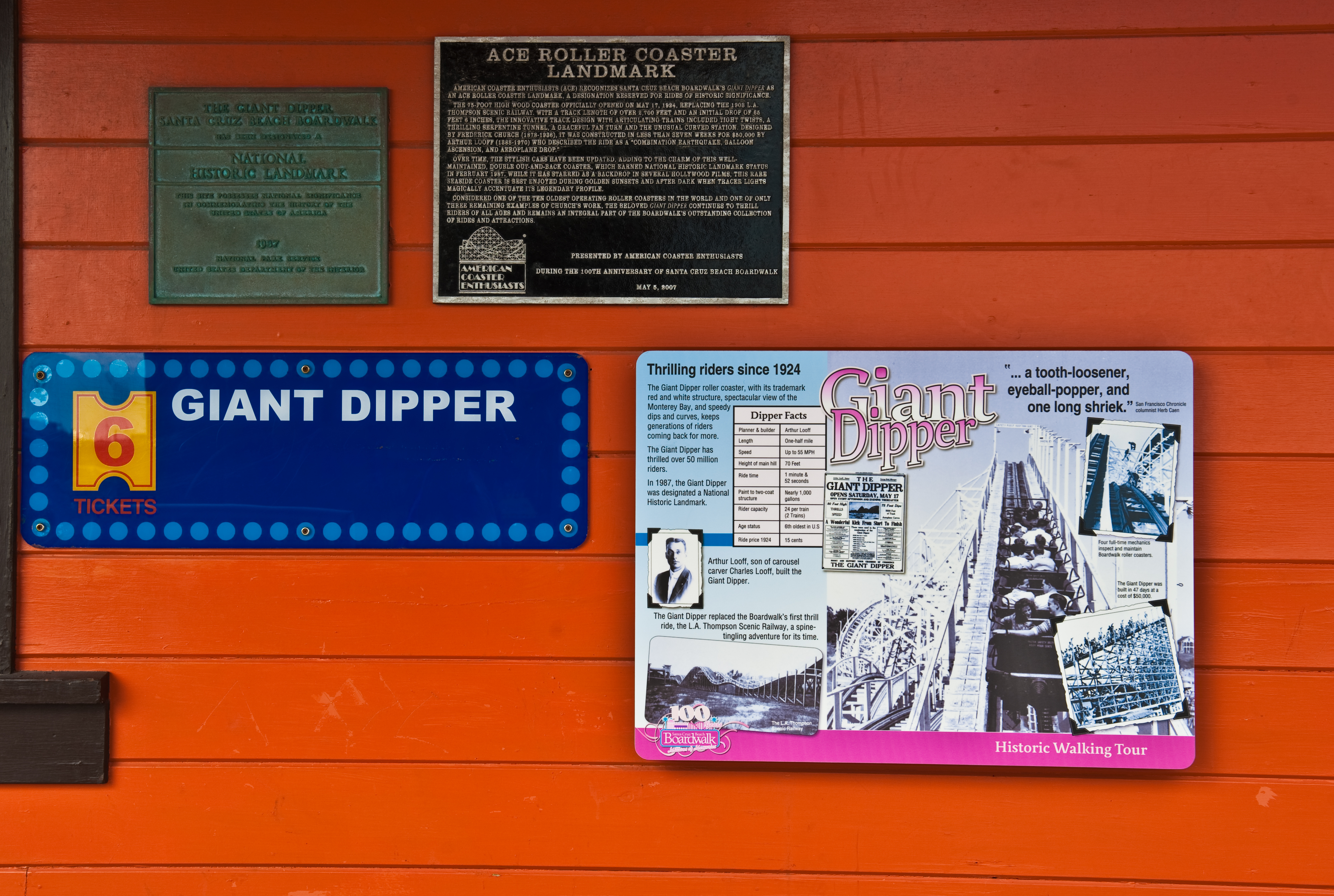
Plaques outside the ride's entrance

Since the Giant Dipper was one of the first roller coasters in existence when it opened, many people were concerned about the safety of the ride. Looff, as well as a local newspaper, insisted it was "virtually impossible" for the cars to leave the track because of the makeup of the trains and track. Although several incidents happened on the ride, none were related to the integrity of the track or trains. Many people call the Giant Dipper the icon and crown jewel of Santa Cruz Beach Boardwalk as well as one of the nation's most exciting roller coasters. It is considered to be the signature ride of the park.

The Giant Dipper is referred to in the song "Big Dipper", from the 1996 album The Golden Age by David Lowery's band Cracker. It is also the subject of the song "Rollercoaster by the Sea" by Jonathan Richman and The Modern Lovers, from their 1977 album, Rock 'n' Roll with the Modern Lovers.

The ride also appeared in many television commercials and movies, including The Lost Boys, Sudden Impact, The Sting II, Bumblebee and Dangerous Minds. By the early 1970s, it was considered the last "classic roller coaster" between Vancouver and San Diego.

=== Awards ===
On February 27, 1987, the United States National Park Service designated Giant Dipper a National Historic Landmark. The park's Looff Carousel received the same designation.

In June 1994, Giant Dipper received the Golden Age Coaster award from American Coaster Enthusiasts (ACE). It was one of only two roller coasters to receive the designation, the other being Giant Dipper at Belmont Park. The award recognized both rides for their historic significance and status as surviving examples of the Golden Age of roller coasters, a period of rapid innovation during the 1920s when nearly 2,000 coasters were constructed.

The Golden Age award was later replaced by the ACE Roller Coaster Landmark award. Giant Dipper received that designation on May 5, 2007, during the 100th anniversary celebration of Santa Cruz Beach Boardwalk. The award also recognized the coaster as one of only three remaining roller coasters designed by Frederick Church. The other two are Dragon Coaster at Playland Park and Giant Dipper at Belmont Park.

=== Rankings ===
Golden Ticket Awards: Top wood Roller Coasters
Year									1998	1999
Ranking									18	16
Year	2000	2001	2002	2003	2004	2005	2006	2007	2008	2009
Ranking	18	21	26	29	32	33 (tie)	34	22	23	22
Year	2010	2011	2012	2013	2014	2015	2016	2017	2018	2019
Ranking	22	28	17	22	17	13	17	31	21 (tie)	17
Year	2020	2021	2022	2023	2024	2025	2026			
Ranking	N/A	28	31 (tie)	29	32	33	47 (tie)			

== See also ==
- Amusement rides on the National Register of Historic Places
- National Register of Historic Places listings in Santa Cruz County, California

Preceded by Jack Rabbit	World's Fastest Roller Coaster; May 1924 – June 1927	Succeeded by Cyclone
