= Santa Cruz Beach Boardwalk =

Amusement park in Santa Cruz, California

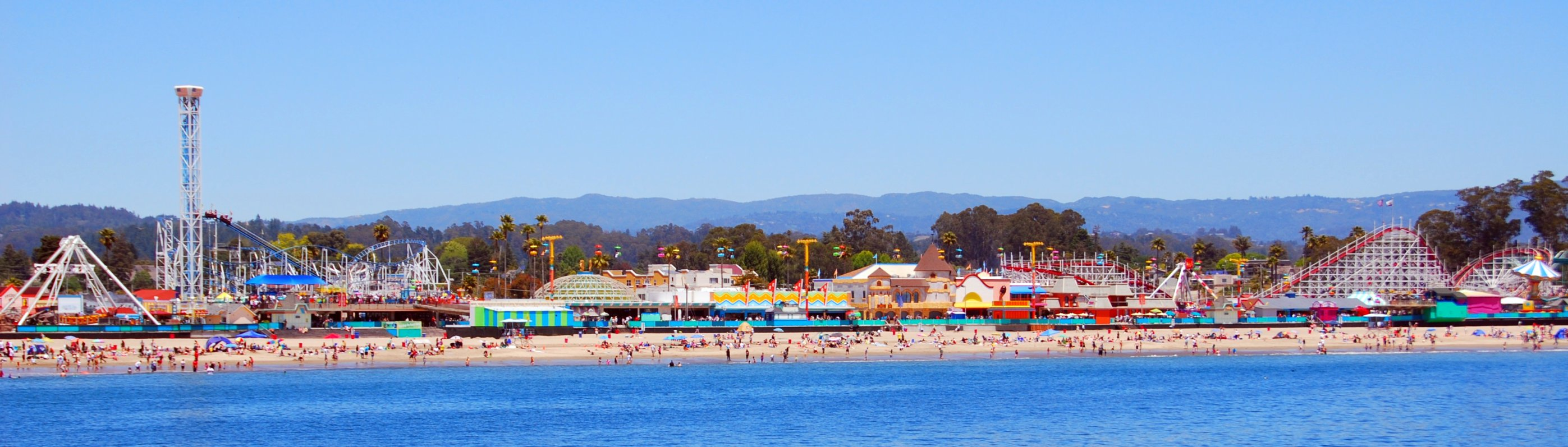
- Interactive map of Santa Cruz Beach Boardwalk
- Location: Santa Cruz, California, United States
- Coordinates: 36°57′51″N 122°01′04″W
- Status: Operating
- Opened: 1907; 119 years ago
- Owner: Santa Cruz Seaside Company
- Operating season: Year-round (limited operation November–early February)

Attractions
- Total: 35
- Roller coasters: 3
- Water rides: 1
- Website: beachboardwalk.com

California Historical Landmark
- Reference no.: 983

The Santa Cruz Beach Boardwalk is an oceanfront amusement park in Santa Cruz, California. Founded in 1907, it is California's oldest surviving amusement park and one of the few seaside parks on the West Coast of the United States.

== Description ==
The boardwalk extends along the coast of the Monterey Bay, from just east of the Santa Cruz Municipal Wharf to the mouth of the San Lorenzo River. At the western edge of the park lies a large building originally known as The Plunge, now Neptune's Kingdom, a pirate-themed recreation center which contains a video arcade and an indoor miniature golf course. Next to this is the Casino Fun Center which includes a laser tag arena and next to that is the Cocoanut Grove banquet room and conference center. A Laffing Sal automated character, from San Francisco's Playland, is viewable near the miniature golf course.

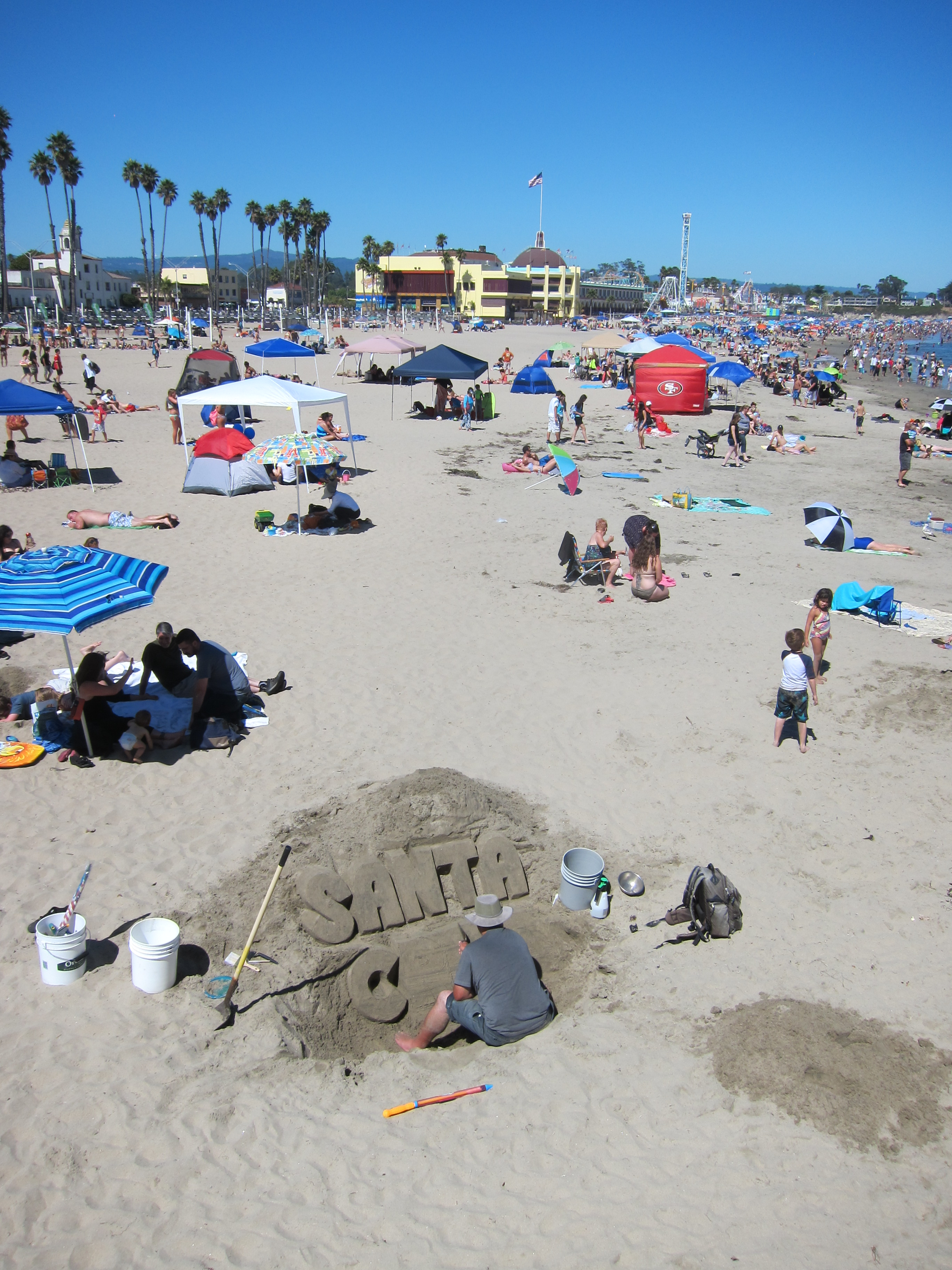
The main beach and boardwalk

East of the casino, the boardwalk portion of the park stretches along a wide, sandy Main Beach visitors can access easily from the park. The eastern end of the boardwalk is dominated by the Giant Dipper, a wooden roller coaster that is one of the most visible landmarks in Santa Cruz. The Dipper and the Looff Carousel, which still contains its original 342-pipe organ built in 1894, are both on the US National Register of Historic Places. They were, together, declared to be a National Historic Landmark in 1987 and the park is California Historical Landmark number 983.

There are old-fashioned and modern styled carnival games and snack booths throughout the 24-acre (9.7-hectare) park. It is located at 400 Beach Street in Santa Cruz, 36°57′51″N 122°01′04″W south of the Ocean Street exit of California State Route 1, which is the southern terminus of California State Route 17.

== History ==
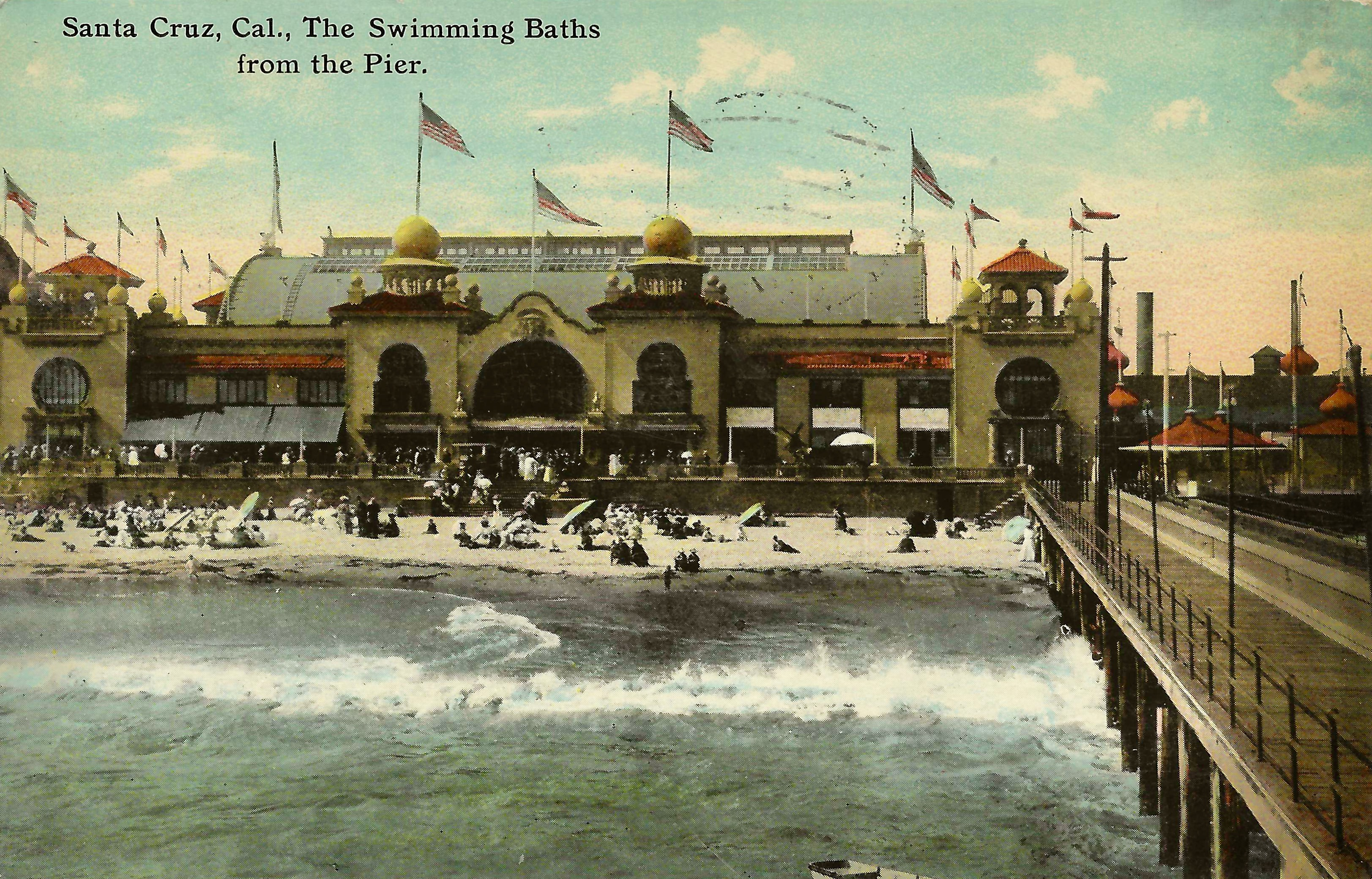
Santa Cruz Swimming Baths at the Boardwalk, Pacific Novelty Company Postcards, circa 1910.

Fred W. Swanton formed the Santa Cruz Beach, Cottage, and Tent City Corporation in 1903 and the following year, the City of Santa Cruz granted permission for commercial buildings to be built. On 14 June 1904, the Neptune Casino opened with an arcade, grill and dining room, and a theater.

The beach was a destination for railroads and trolleys from 1875. From 1927 to 1959, Southern Pacific Railroad ran Suntan Special excursion trains to the beach from San Francisco, Oakland, and San Jose every summer Sunday and holiday. A short passenger service to Roaring Camp via the San Lorenzo river canyon in Henry Cowell Redwoods State Park was restored in 1985 by the Santa Cruz, Big Trees and Pacific Railway, which stops in front of the park.

As of 2011, the park is headed by Charles Canfield, the son of Laurence Canfield, the president of the park from the 1950s until the early 1980s. It has won the Best Seaside Amusement Park Award from Amusement Today every year since 2007 except for 2015. Although there is no admission and the beach is public, a parking fee is charged when the rides are open. Season or day passes can be purchased or individual points for $1; each ride costs between 5 and 8 tickets.

Due to the COVID-19 pandemic, the park temporarily shut down in mid-March 2020. The park reopened on November 7, 2020. The park then subsequently shut down again on November 10, 2020, due to Santa Cruz County re-entering the Substantial tier of the California Blueprint for a Safer Economy. The park then re-opened select rides to California residents on April 1, 2021.

== Boardwalk's Cocoanut Grove ==
Cave Train, c. 1962

The Boardwalk's Cocoanut Grove conference center includes banquet rooms and a performing arts venue. Food, drink, and theater were profitable aspects of the resort since the original Casino of Swanton in 1904. Although gambling was never legal, it was generally known that guests could take boats from the "pleasure pier" to a ship in the harbor to play games of chance in the early days. During Prohibition from 1920 to 1933, serving alcoholic drinks was also outlawed and the casino changed its name to Cocoanut Grove. The name includes an old spelling of Coconut, Cocos nucifera, which was used in the popular Marx Brothers movie The Cocoanuts of 1929. The name was also used by a number of popular nightclubs of the era, including one in The Ambassador Hotel in Los Angeles, California.

In the 1930s and 1940s, Cocoanut Grove was a popular spot for major big band acts, including Stan Kenton, Benny Goodman, Lionel Hampton and Tommy Dorsey.

Today, Cocoanut Grove rarely hosts musical acts. It is a venue for weddings, banquets, school formal occasions and reunions, and corporate events. The Grand Ballroom and Sun Room complexes include over 20,000 square feet (1,900 m^{2}) of space and commercial kitchens.

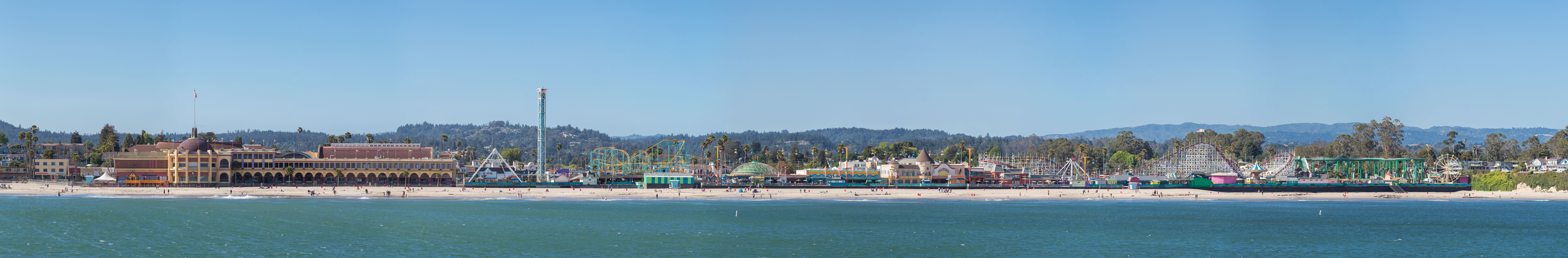

== Class-Action Wage Lawsuit ==
In 2023, the Santa Cruz Seaside Company—the owners and operators of the Santa Cruz Beach Boardwalk—faced a class-action lawsuit accusing the company of improperly paying employees, resulting in a 5.9 million dollar settlement. Between July 2019 and August 2019, the plaintiffs claimed the boardwalk failed to "properly pay [employees] all overtime wages and minimum wages for all hours worked, failed to provide all meal and rest breaks to which they were entitled, failed to timely pay all wages upon termination of employment, failed to provide accurate wage statements, failed to reimburse necessary business-related expenses, and failed to adhere to other related protections afforded by the California Labor Code and applicable Industrial Welfare Commission Wage Order."

The lawsuit was filed into the Santa Cruz County Superior Court in July 2023. Represented by Blackstone Law, both sides settled the matter on January 30, 2025 for 5.9 million dollars.

== Rides ==
=== Current roller coasters ===
Coaster	Opened	Manufacturer	Model
Giant Dipper	1924	Designed by Frank Prior & Frederick Church; Built by Arthur Looff	Wooden Roller Coaster
Sea Serpent	2000	E&F Miler Industries	Family Coaster
Undertow	2013	Maurer Söhne	Spinning Coaster

=== Thrill & family rides ===
Ride	Opened	Manufacturer	Model
Crazy Surf	1998	Wisdom Rides	Genesis
Cyclone	2004	Hrubetz	Round Up
Double Shot	2005	S&S Worldwide	Double Shot Tower
Fireball	2003	KMG	Revolution 20
Rock-O-Plane	1954	Eyerly	Rock-O-Plane
Shockwave	2017	Zamperla	Disk’o
Surge	2024	Chance Rides	Freestyle
Typhoon	2017	ARM Rides	Typhoon
Vertigo 360	2026	Zamperla	360 Gravity Defy
WipeOut	1998	HUSS	Breakdance
Cave Train	1961	Arrow Development	Cave Train
Dream Wheel	2024	Chance Rides	Century Wheel
Freefall	2002	Moser’s Rides	Junior Drop Tower
Ghost Blasters	2001	Sally Corporation	Shooting Dark Ride
Haunted Castle	2010	Sally Corporation	Dark Ride
Lighthouse Lift-Off	2021	Sunkid	Lift Tower
Logger’s Revenge	1977	Arrow Development	Log Flume
Looff Carousel	1911	Looff	Carousel
Pirate Ship	1984	Chance Rides	Pirate Ship
Riptide	1993	Larson International	Tilt-A-Whirl
Sea Swings	2008	Bertazzon	Swing Carousel
Sky Glider	1967	Universal Mobility	Chairlift
Space Race	2000	Space Race Inc.	Space Race
Speed Bumps	1996	Majestic Manufacturing	Bumper Cars
Tornado	2000	Wisdom Rides	Tornado
Tsunami	1999	Moser’s Rides	Musik Express
Twirlin Teacups	2019	Zamperla	Teacups
Wave Rider	2021	Battech Enterprises	Permanent Dry Slide

=== Kiddie rides ===
Ride	Opened	Manufacturer	Model
Beach Swing	2013	Zamperla	Happy Swing
Bouncin’ Buggies	2016	Zamperla	Jump Around
Bulgy the Whale	1960	Eyerly	Bulgy the Whale
Convoy	2000	Zamperla	Convoy
Jet Copters	1990	Zamperla	Helicopter ride
Sea Dragons	1976	Zamperla	Sea Dragon
Speed Boats	1960	Venture	Speed Boats
Speedway	2002	Zamperla	Speedway

== Former rides ==
Name	Opened	Closed	Notes
Hurricane	1992	2012	Replaced by Undertow.
Videostorm			Replaced by Tsunami.
Whirlwind			
The Red Baron	1970s		
Chaos	1997	2002	Replaced by Fireball.
The Flying Cages	1960s		
Dante's Inferno	1935		Replaced by Haunted Castle.
Paratrooper	1965	1985	Replaced by Wave Jammer.
Starfish	2004	2012	
Wave Jammer	1986	2001	Replaced by Rock & Roll.
The Airplane	1950		
Auto Scooter	1933		
Jet Star	1972	1991	
Treasure Island			Replaced by Haunted Castle.
Roll-O-Plane	1940s		Located where Logger's Revenge is today.
Drive-A-Boat			Replaced by Arctic Flyer.
The Super Round-Up	1972	1991	Replaced by the former Typhoon.
Pirate's Cove			Replaced by Haunted Castle.
WipeOut	1993	1996	Replaced by Fireball.
The Trabant			Located by the former 1961 Ferris Wheel.
Bermuda Triangle (Scrambler)			Replaced by Cliff Hanger.
Spider			
Autorama	1961	1998	Traveled through the park.
Spin Out (Tea Cups)	1989	2003	Replaced by Cyclone.
The Octopus	1950s		
Arctic Flyer	1973		Replaced by Videostorm.
Wild Mouse		1975	Replaced by Logger's Revenge.
Crazy Surf (KMG X-Factory)			Sold to UK showman Joseph Manning in October 2018; converted from park ride to travelling model by Eagle Fabrications.
Cliff Hanger	2003	2023	Replaced by Surge in 2024.
Rock & Roll	2002	2023	Replaced by Dream Wheel in 2024.
