= Giant Dipper (Belmont Park) =

Roller coaster at Belmont Park in California

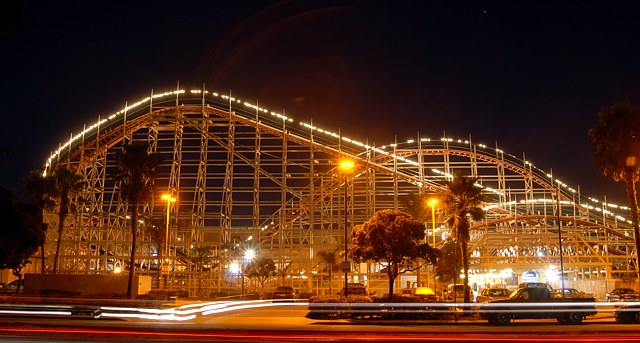
- Wooden roller coaster in Belmont Park

Belmont Park, San Diego, California
- Location: Belmont Park, San Diego, California
- Coordinates: 32°46′18″N 117°15′0″W
- Mission Beach Roller Coaster
- U.S. National Register of Historic Places
- U.S. National Historic Landmark
- California Historical Landmark
- San Diego Historic Landmark
- Location within San Diego Location within San Diego County, California Location within California Location within the United States
- Location: 3000 Mission Boulevard, San Diego, California
- Coordinates: 32°46′18″N 117°15′0″W
- Area: 2.8 acres (1.1 ha)
- Built: 1925
- Architects: Frank Prior, Fredrick Church
- Architectural style: "Bobs"-type coaster
- NRHP reference No.: 78000753
- CHISL No.: 1044
- SDHL No.: 90

Significant dates
- Added to NRHP: December 27, 1978
- Designated NHL: February 27, 1987
- Designated SDHL: December 7, 1973
- Status: Operating
- Opening date: July 4, 1925

General statistics
- Type: Wood
- Manufacturer: Frank Prior, Fredrick Church
- Designer: Frank Prior, Fredrick Church
- Model: Twister
- Track layout: 8 layers laminated wood strips with 1/4"x3" wide steel rail
- Lift/launch system: Chain lift hill
- Height: 75 ft (23 m)
- Drop: 60 ft (18 m)
- Length: 2,800 ft (850 m)
- Speed: 48 mph (77 km/h)
- Inversions: 0
- Duration: 1:45
- Max vertical angle: 40 degrees at bottom of first drop°
- Height restriction: 50 in (127 cm)
- Trains: Unknown number of trains with 6 cars; riders arranged 2 across in 2 rows for a total of 24 riders per train
- Giant Dipper at RCDB

The Giant Dipper, also known as the Mission Beach Roller Coaster and by other previous names, is a historic wooden roller coaster located at Belmont Park in the Mission Beach area of San Diego, California, United States. Built in 1925, it is one of two remaining wooden coasters on the West Coast designed by notable coaster designers Frank Prior and Frederick Church, along with the other Giant Dipper, which opened a year earlier at the Santa Cruz Beach Boardwalk. Giant Dipper at Belmont Park was added to the National Register of Historic Places in 1978, and it was later designated a National Historic Landmark in 1987.

== Description ==
The Giant Dipper is located at the northeast corner of Belmont Park, a waterfront amusement park at the junction of Mission Boulevard and West Mission Bay Drive. The coaster occupies an irregular area about 100 by 500 feet (30 m × 152 m) in size, and is accessed via a terminal structure on its west side. It has a track length of 2,800 feet (850 m), and its highest hills, located roughly at opposite ends of the area, reach 75 feet (23 m) in height. A sign with the name "Belmont" is affixed to the wooden trestle structure at its northeast edge.

== History ==
The coaster was built in 1925 as part of a major real estate development led by John D. and Adolph Spreckels to attract visitors and residents to the Mission Beach area. The Mission Beach Amusement Center was built for $2.5 million and opened in 1925, with the coaster as one of its main attractions. It was designed by Frank Prior and Frederick Church, coaster designers based in Venice, California, who also oversaw its construction. The Spreckels' bequeathed the attraction to the city, which in 1954 was leased to Jack Ray. He renamed the park Belmont Park, after another park in Montreal. The roller coaster was severely damaged by fire in 1955, and Ray subsequently declared bankruptcy.

Threatened with demolition by the city in 1978, local citizens banded together to rescue it and a few surviving attractions of the defunct park. It underwent a full restoration in 1989–90.

== Events ==
In 1997, the Giant Dipper held a coaster–riding marathon sponsored by a local radio station, Star 100.7. The marathon consisted of 11 consecutive days riding the coaster for more than 12 hours per day. The radio station arranged a second marathon in 1998, which was eventually won by contestants who split a check for $50,000 in cash prizes after riding the coaster for 70 days.

== Popular culture ==
The Giant Dipper and Belmont Park are included in author Stephen M. Silverman's 2019 book The Amusement Park: 900 Years of Thrills and Spills, and the Dreamers and Schemers Who Built Them.

== See also ==
- Amusement rides on the National Register of Historic Places
