= Belmont Park (San Diego) =

Amusement park in San Diego

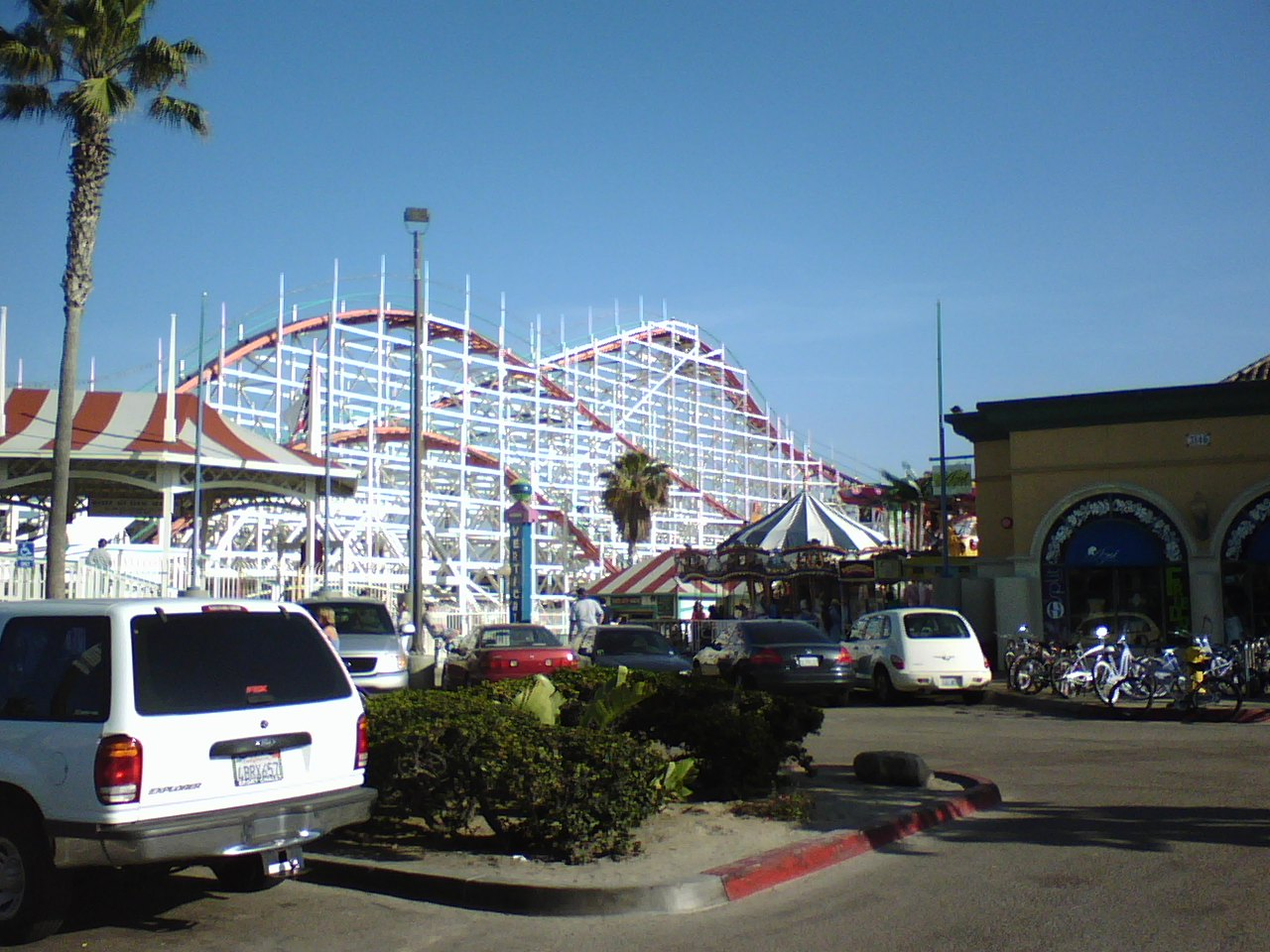
- View of the entrance to Belmont Park with the Giant Dipper roller coaster in the background

- Location within San Diego Location within California Location within the United States
- Interactive map of Belmont Park
- Location: Mission Beach, San Diego, California, United States
- Coordinates: 32°46′17″N 117°15′8″W
- Opened: July 4, 1925
- Owner: Pacifica Enterprises LLC
- Operated by: Eat.Drink.Sleep
- Slogan: Join Us By The Beach
- Operating season: Year Round
- Attendance: 4 acres (1.6 ha)

Attractions
- Total: 13
- Roller coasters: 1
- Website: www.belmontpark.com

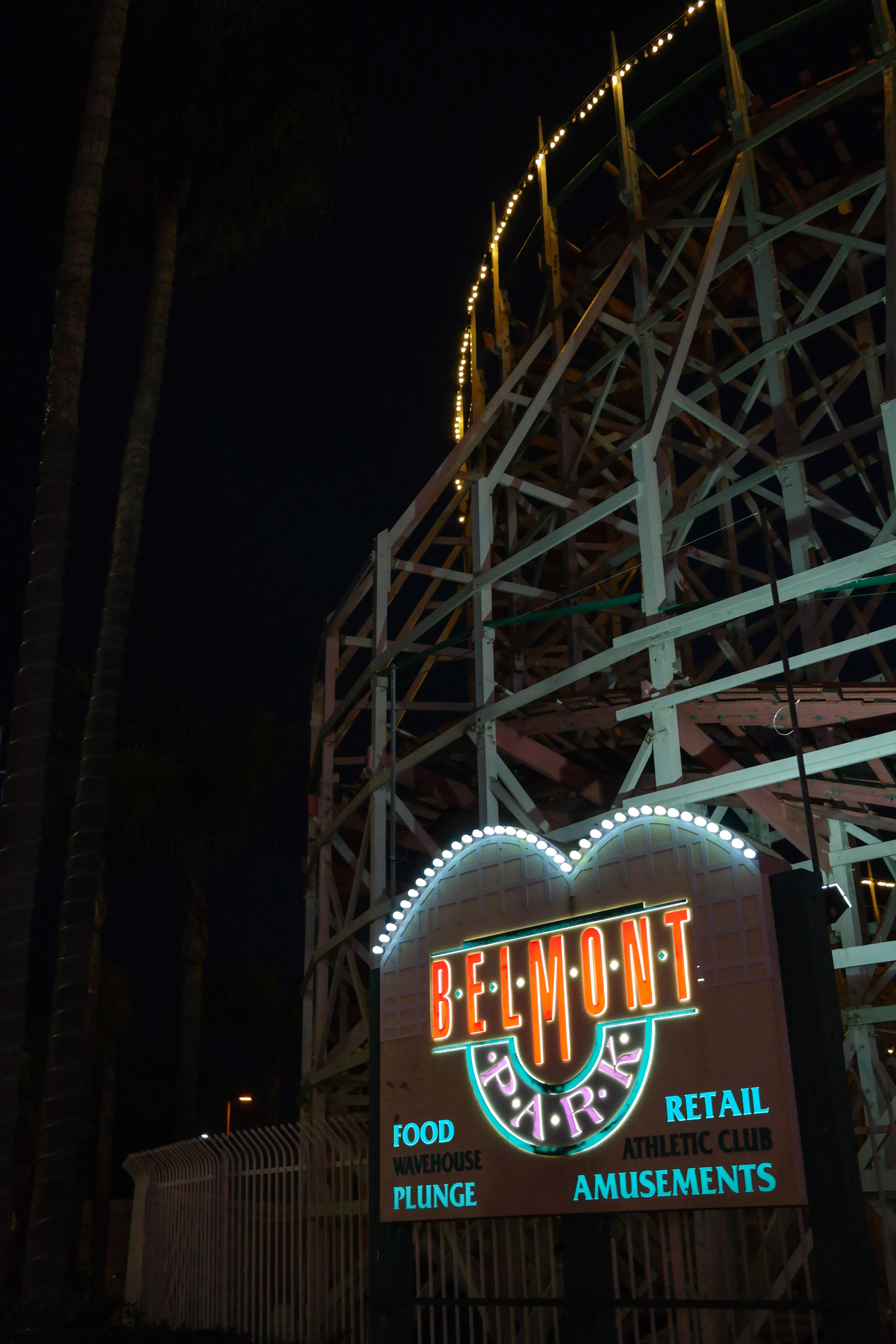
Belmont park is a place where you can have fun and ride the roller coasters the photo that I'm using is the welcome sign to enter the park.

Belmont Park is an oceanfront historic amusement park in the Mission Beach community of San Diego, California. The park was developed by sugar magnate John D. Spreckels and opened on July 4, 1925, as the Mission Beach Amusement Center. In addition to providing recreation and amusement, it was intended as a way to help Spreckels sell land in Mission Beach. Located on the beach, it attracts millions of people each year.

The park's most iconic attraction is the historic Giant Dipper roller coaster, which is considered a local landmark.

== History ==
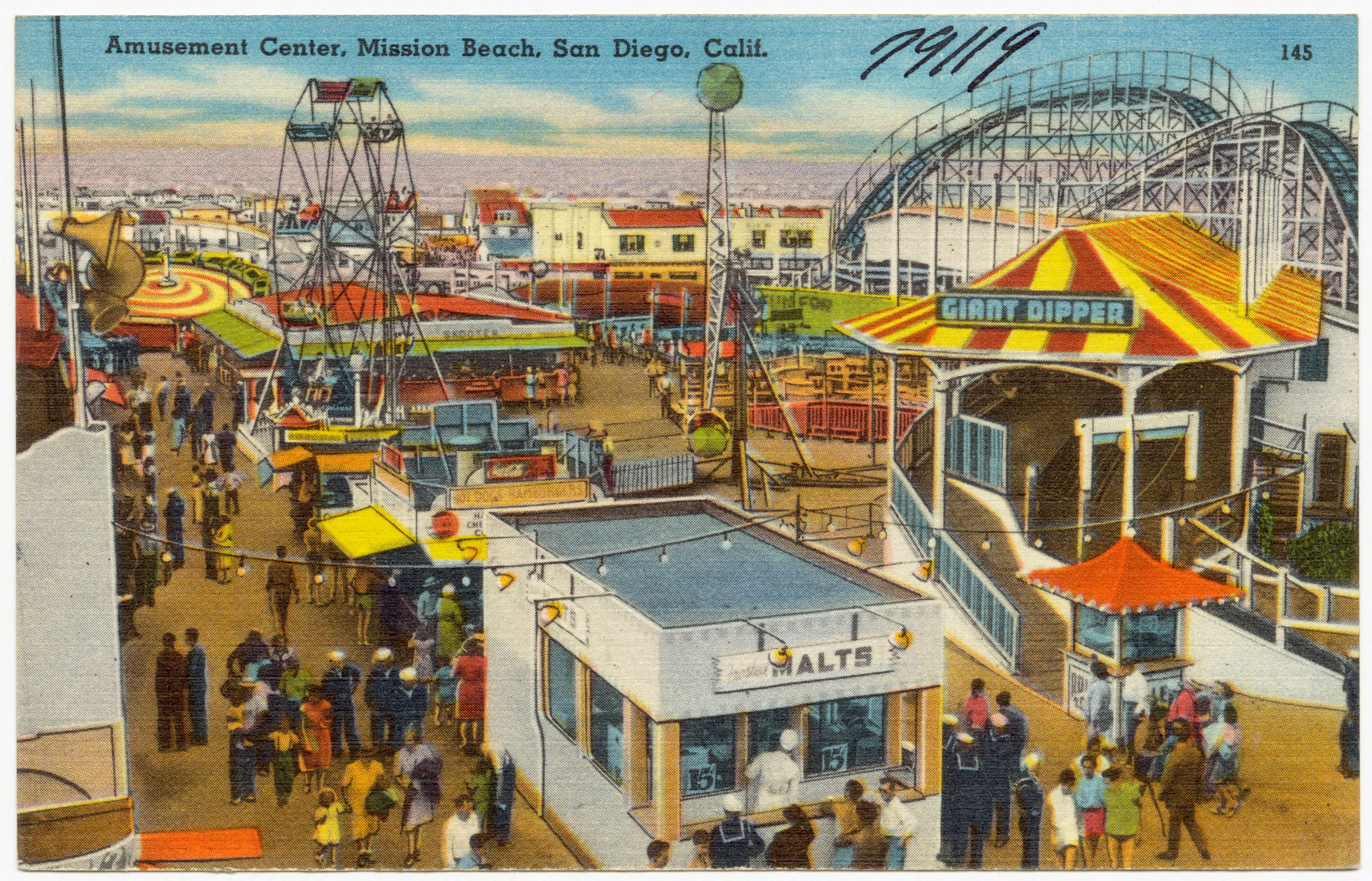
1940s postcard

The attractions and rides that remain from the original 1925 park include the Giant Dipper, a wooden roller coaster that is listed on the National Register of Historic Places. Another historic facility is The Plunge, an indoor swimming pool. The Plunge was originally a salt water pool called the Natatorium and was the largest salt-water pool in the world; it now contains fresh water. In 2013 the California Coastal Commission approved plans to remove a portion of a large mural by artist Wyland during planned renovations. The Plunge was closed in 2014 due to disrepair. Plans to demolish and rebuild the Plunge were approved in January 2016. It reopened in 2019 over the Fourth of July weekend after a $12 million renovation.

In 2002, businessman/surfer Tom Lochtefeld bought the master lease for the property and started development of the Wave House.

In November 2012, Pacifica Enterprises LLC. acquired the park leasehold in a bankruptcy trustee sale. Pacifica Enterprises, along with Eat.Drink.Sleep, assumed operations of the park and started a restoration and revitalization of the park. Eat.Drink.Sleep's team of Brett Miller, Steve Smith and Justin Lopez developed and led the opening of new restaurants, Cannonball, South Mission Draft, Belmonty's Burgers and Hot Dog on a Stick and a remodel of Beach House Grill.

== Events ==
Winter Wonder is an annual event held at Belmont Park featuring rides and family-friendly festive activities.

On September 21, 2023, Beach House put on a Country music concert. In addition, Belmont Park also organized and hosted a Fall Festival. It started the second week of September and went on until Halloween. The festival included fall treats, live music, a pumpkin patch, rides, and more.

== Controversies ==
In the early 1980s, the San Diego City Council led by then-Councilman Mike Gotch called for proposals to redevelop Belmont Park and clean up the area, which had fallen into disrepair and developed a seedy reputation. The city received five redevelopment bids but eventually decided not to take action at that time. Later the matter was reopened and the city's Real Estate Development Department was authorized to contact architect Paul Thoryk and developer Graham MacHutchin regarding their proposal since it was the only development that restored the Plunge, the city's historic public swimming pool. On June 24, 1986, the City Council voted 6 to 1 to grant an exclusive right to negotiate a lease on the site with Thoryk & MacHutchin who by then were joined by a subsidiary of San Diego Gas & Electric as a partner in Belmont Park Associates. The parties negotiated a lease, plans were completed and approved, and construction began including the demolition and reconstruction of the exterior walls of the Plunge building which did not meet earthquake code requirements. The redeveloped Belmont Park and Plunge Building reopened in the summer of 1988.

On November 3, 2010, Wave House Belmont Park LLC filed for Chapter 11 bankruptcy in US Bankruptcy Court (Bankruptcy Petition #: 10–19663–11) citing a 700% increase in rent owed to the City of San Diego as the reason. Tom Lochtefeld, Belmont Park Manager Member, alleges the city has breached its lease agreement. In 2011 Lochtefeld filed a $25 million lawsuit against the City of San Diego accusing the city of breach of contract and fraudulent misrepresentation for preventing him from completing a second major expansion of the park including adding a hotel. That suit was settled in November 2013 after Lochtefeld decided not to pursue the case against the city.

== Current attractions ==
In addition to the iconic Giant Dipper, amusements include a Tilt-A-Whirl, a three-story drop tower (the "Vertical Plunge"), the Liberty Carousel, and the Beach Blaster. Newer attractions since 2016 include a Zip Line, a 3-level Sky Ropes obstacle course, a 7D Theater called Xanadu, and a 3-level Tron-themed Laser Tag arena. The park's rides, including the Giant Dipper, are operated by the San Diego Coaster Company.

The Giant Dipper Belmont Park

== The Giant Dipper ==
The Giant Dipper is a roller coaster in San Diego’s Mission beach, it reaches 73 feet in height and goes up to 55 mph. The roller coaster has had some rocky history but has experienced many renovations in the past decades. The coaster fell into disrepair from 1960-1970 and later faced threats of demolition. However the Giant Dipper underwent a $2 million renovation by D.H Morgan Manufacturing, and reopened again in 1990. Then again, underwent a renovation in August of 2026. The Giant Dipper received its final touches on the $1.6 million renovation, adding new tracks, paint, and lighting elements to be opened again in September of 2026.

=== Current Rides ===
The park is typically open from 11 am until 10 pm or 11 pm. Current rides are as follows:

Photo	Ride name	Manufacturer	Ride Type	Year opened	Notes
	Giant Dipper	Prior & Church; Trains by D. H. Morgan Manufacturing	Wooden Roller Coaster	1925	A historic wooden roller coaster built by designers Frank Prior and Frederick Church, and the only one whose construction they supervised.
	Flip Out	Moser	Gyro Loop	2023	A ride that offers the interactive action of riders that may control the drive and the clutch.
	Beach Blaster	Chance	Revolution 20	2005	Riders rotate 360-degrees while simultaneously swinging back and forth in a pendulum motion.
	Octotron	Chance	Unicoaster	2010	A thrill ride travels on a coaster-like track. Riders control the forward and backward motion as well as the speed of the spin.
	Overdrive	Larson	Bumper Cars	2013	A classic bumper cars ride.
	Krazy Kars	Larson	Bumper Cars	2015	An inner tube-shaped bumper car attraction.
	Tilt-A-Whirl	Larson	Tilt-A-Whirl	2008	A tilt-a-whirl ride with cars shaped like ice cream sundaes.
	Liberty Carousel	Chance	Carousel	2000	A classic carousel ride.
	Mic Drop	Moser	Freefall Tower	2020	A gentle drop tower meant for children.
	Crazy Submarine	Zamperla	Crazy Bus	1980	A submarine themed ride meant for children.
	Speedway	Woods Amusement Rides B.V.	Whip	2000	A whip-style ride with racecar themed vehicles.
	Belmont Express	Chance	C.P. Huntington train	1970	
	Zero Gravity	Moser	Spring Ride 12 Rotation	2019	

Current attractions are as follows:

- Sky Ropes
- Laser Tag
- Xanadu 7D Theater
- Lazer Maze
- Tiki Town Adventure Golf
- Zip Line
- Rock Wall
- Jungle Gems
- Escapology

=== Restaurants ===
Restaurants in Belmont Park include Beach House Grill (formerly WaveHouse), Cannonball, Draft, Belmonty's Burgers, Hot Dog on a Stick, Sweet Shoppe, Dippin' Dots, Round Table Pizza, Icee, Wetzel's Pretzels, Beach Treats, and Dole Whip.

== Appearances in Popular Culture ==
Much of the music video for the song M+M's from the band Blink-182 was filmed at Belmont Park and SOMA. The song was the lead single from their debut album Cheshire Cat (1995).
