= List of people associated with the California Gold Rush =

The California gold rush occurred in Northern California, during the period from 1848 to 1855.

List of people associated with the California Gold Rush
Name	Image	Birth, death	Birthplace	Profession	Notes
John "Grizzly" Adams		1812–1860	Medway, Massachusetts, U.S.	mountain man, trainer of grizzly bears	
Elihu Anthony		1818–1905	Greenfield, New York, U.S.	alcalde, blacksmith, industrialist, abolitionist, postmaster, Methodist minister	one of the founding fathers of the city of Santa Cruz, California
Philip Danforth Armour		1832–1901	Stockbridge, New York, U.S.	meatpacking industrialist	started his meat packing business with funds from success in the Gold Fields
Josiah Belden		1815–1892	Connecticut, U.S.	politician, rancho grantee	first mayor of San Jose, California
Charles H. Bennett		1811–1855	Walla Walla, Washington, U.S.	soldier, hotelier	present at the first discovery of gold
John Bidwell		1819–1900	Chautauqua County, New York, U.S.	politician, soldier	founder of the city of Chico, California
Samuel Brannan		1819–1889	Saco, Massachusetts (now Maine), U.S.	politician, businessman, journalist	first to publicize the California Gold Rush, and California's first millionaire
Juana Briones de Miranda		c. 1802 – 1889	Villa de Branciforte (modern day Santa Cruz), California	Californio ranchera, medical practitioner, merchant	founding mother of San Francisco, California, and Mayfield, California (now Palo Alto, California)
R. C. Chambers		1832–1901	Lexington, Ohio, U.S.	businessman, politician, minerals miner, banker	
Jean Baptiste Charbonneau		1805–1866	Fort Mandan, North Dakota, U.S.	Shoshone–French explorer, guide, fur trapper, and military scout	
Alvin Aaron Coffey Sr.		1822–1902	Mason County, Kentucky, U.S.	African American pioneer, homesteader, miner, and farmer in California; formerly enslaved	
Belle Cora		c. 1827–1862	Baltimore, Maryland, U.S.	madam of the Barbary Coast of San Francisco	
Lotta Crabtree		1847–1924	New York City, New York, U.S.	actress, entertainer, comedian, philanthropist	
William D. Bradshaw		1826–1864	Buncombe County, North Carolina, U.S	prospector, explorer	
Charles Crocker		1822–1888	Troy, New York, U.S.	railroad executive, businessman	
Alonzo Delano		1806–1874	Aurora, Erie County, New York, U.S.	writer, forty-niner	
George Washington Dennis		c. 1825–1916	Mobile County, Alabama, U.S.	African American businessperson, real estate developer, abolitionist	one of San Francisco's wealthiest Black men in the late 19th-century
Charles S. Fairfax		1829–1869	Vaucluse Plantation, Virginia, U.S.	politician	from nobility
Thomas Fallon		1825–1885	Ireland	Irish-born politician	10th Mayor of San Jose, California
Joseph Libbey Folsom		1817–1855	Meredith, New Hampshire, U.S.	real estate investor, military personnel	founder of Folsom, California
John C. Frémont		1813–1890	Savannah, Georgia, U.S.	explorer, military officer, politician	namesake of Fremont, California
John White Geary		1819–1873	Westmoreland County, Pennsylvania, U.S.	lawyer, politician, military leader	
Domingo Ghirardelli		1817–1894	Rapallo, Kingdom of Sardinia (now Italy)	Italian-born chocolatier	founder of the Ghirardelli Chocolate Company in San Francisco, California.
Mifflin Wistar Gibbs		1823–1915	Philadelphia, Pennsylvania, U.S.	African American politician, businessman, publisher, abolitionist	During the Fraser Canyon Gold Rush, he led a migration of African Americans from San Francisco to Victoria, British Columbia, Canada
Thomas Gilman		1830–1911	Tennessee, U.S.	African American freedman, miner, farmer	was an enslaved African American who self–purchase freedom during the mid-19th-century
George Gordon		1818–1869	London, England	developer, entrepreneur	transported emigrants to San Francisco, developed the South Park neghborhood, started San Francisco's first sugar refinery
Daniel Govan		1829–1911	Northampton County, North Carolina, U.S.	miner, planter, soldier	served as a Confederate general during the American Civil War
Ulysses S. Grant		1822–1885	Point Pleasant, Ohio, U.S.	18th president, soldier	served in the Mexican–American War; led the Union Army to victory in the American Civil War
Alvinza Hayward		1821–1904	Vermont, U.S.	mine-owner, capitalist, businessman, financier	made his fortune during the California Gold Rush, as a gold miner
George Hearst		1820–1891	Sullivan, Missouri Territory (now Missouri), U.S.	businessperson, politician	used slight mining knowledge from Missouri to succeed in 1850s gold rush investment
Albert W. Hicks		c. 1820–1860	Foster, Rhode Island, U.S.	thief, murderer, mutineer, pirate	
Frederick A. Hihn		1829–1913	Duchy of Brunswick (now Germany)	politician, industrialist, real estate investor	leading land developer in Santa Cruz County, California
John Wesley Hillman		1832–1915	Albany, New York, U.S.	prospector, explorer	
Sherman Otis Houghton		1828–1914	New York City, New York, U.S.	politician, miner	
William B. Ide		1796–1852	Rutland, Massachusetts, U.S.	politician	commander of the California Republic
Frank James		1843–1915	Kearney, Missouri, U.S.	soldier, thief	part of the James–Younger Gang, former Confederate soldier
Seth Kinman		1815–1888	Union County, Pennsylvania, U.S.	mountain man, hunter, chair maker, entertainer	early settler of Humboldt County, California
William Leidesdorff		1810–1848	St. Croix, Danish West Indies (now United States Virgin Islands)	Afro-Caribbean businessman, politician	founder of the city of San Francisco, thought to have been the first black millionaire in the United States
Peter Lester		c. 1814–c. 1897	South Carolina, U.S.	African American businessman, abolitionist	early Black settler in San Francisco
James Lick		1796–1876	Stumpstown (now Fredericksburg), Lebanon County, Pennsylvania, U.S.	businessman, piano builder	
Heinrich Lienhard		1822–1903	Bilten, Canton of Glarus, Switzerland	Swiss–born memoirist	
James W. Marshall		1810–1885	Hopewell Township, New Jersey, U.S.	carpenter, sawmill operator	discoverer of the first gold
Richard Barnes Mason		1797–1850	Lexington Plantation, Fairfax County, Virginia, U.S.	military officer	
Lola Montez		1821–1861	Grange, County Sligo, Connacht, Ireland	Irish-born dancer and courtesan	famous as a "Spanish" dancer, and mistress of King Ludwig I of Bavaria
James McClatchy		1824–1883	Ireland	Irish-born newspaper editor	
Benjamin McCulloch		1811–1862	Rutherford County, Tennessee, U.S.	politician	
Joaquin Miller		1837–1913	Union County, Indiana, U.S.	poet, frontiersman	
Joaquin Murrieta		1829–1853	Álamos, Sonora, Mexico	Mexican outlaw, gold miner, vaquero	"Robin Hood of the West"
Isaac Murphy		c. 1799–1882	Pennsylvania, U.S.	teacher, lawyer, politician, failed miner	8th Governor of Arkansas
John Marion Murphy		1824–1892	Frampton, Quebec, Lower Canada	rancher, miner, businessperson, politician, and an early settler in California	
Joshua Norton		1818–1880	Deptford, England	English-born commodities trader and real estate investor	also known as Emperor Norton
Lester Allan Pelton		1829–1908	Vermilion, Ohio, U.S.	inventor, mechanical engineer	inventor of the "Pelton Runner," considered to be the "Father of Hydroelectric Power"
Vicente Pérez Rosales		1807–1886	Santiago, Chile.	miner, merchant, politician, writer, forty-eighter	wrote an influential text about the gold rush, led later the German colonization of southern Chile
Pío Pico		1801–1894	Mission San Gabriel Arcángel, San Gabriel, Alta California, New Spain	Californio politician, ranchero, entrepreneur	last governor of Alta California under Mexican rule from 1845 to 1846.
Mary Ellen Pleasant		c. 1814–1904	U.S.	African American entrepreneur, real estate investor, abolitionist, financier	first self-made millionaire of African-American heritage
Addison Pratt		1802–1872	Winchester, New Hampshire, U.S.	missionary, farmer, whaler	
José Manuel Ramírez Rosales		1804–1877	Santiago, Chile.	miner, vine and watermelon farmer, painter	introduced Chilean grapes to California
James F. Reed		1800–1874	County Armagh, Kingdom of Ireland	miner, businessman, soldier, settler	
Benjamin B. Redding		1824–1882	Yarmouth, Colony of Nova Scotia (now Nova Scotia, Canada)	British North America-born politician	Mayor of Sacramento, secretary of the State of California
Moses Rodgers		c. 1835–1900	Missouri, U.S.	African American mining engineer, metallurgist	
John Howell Sears		1823–1907	Sullivan County, New York, U.S.	prospector	early pioneer of Searsville and La Honda
William Tecumseh Sherman		1820–1891	Lancaster, Ohio, U.S.	soldier, businessman, educator, author	
Leland Stanford		1824–1893	Watervliet, New York, U.S.	politician, railroad tycoon	
Elijah Steele		1817–1883	New York, U.S.	politician, attorney, jurist	
Levi Strauss		1829–1902	Buttenheim, Kingdom of Bavaria, German Confederation (now Germany)	German Confederation-born entrepreneur	founder of Levi Strauss & Co. of San Francisco, California
John Studebaker		1833–1917	Gettysburg, Pennsylvania, U.S.	businessman	built wheelbarrows in Placerville in the early 1850s and contributed his earnings to the family Studebaker Wagon Corporation
Marie Suize		1824–1892	Savoy, France	French-born gold miner and businesswoman	known for wearing pants, and arrested several times for it.
John Sutter		1803–1880	Kandern, Margraviate of Baden, Holy Roman Empire (now Germany)	German-born Swiss businessman, explorer	established Sutter's Fort
A. A. Townsend		1810–1888	Sussex County, New Jersey, U.S.	miner, prospector, politician	
Ah Toy		1829–1928	Canton, Guangdong, Qing China	sex worker, madam	the first Chinese sex worker in San Francisco
George Treat		1819–1907	Frankfort, Maine, U.S.	businessman, abolitionist	pioneer in the Mission District, San Francisco
Matthew Turner		1825–1909	Geneva, Ohio, U.S.	shipbuilder	considered "the 'grandaddy' of big time wooden shipbuilding on the Pacific Coast"
Mark Twain		1835–1910	Florida, Missouri, U.S.	writer, humorist, and essayist	
Mariano Guadalupe Vallejo		1807–1890	Monterey, Alta California, Viceroyalty of New Spain (now California, U.S.)	Californio politician, military leader	
William Waldo		1812–1881		politician	
Carl David Maria Weber		1814–1881	Steinwenden, Palatinate, Kingdom of Bavaria (now Rhineland-Palatinate, Germany)	entrepreneur, miner, land owner	founder of the city of Stockton, California
Bela Wellman		1819–1887		entrepreneur	founder of Wellman, Peck and Company
Luzena Wilson		c. 1820–1902		entrepreneur	founder of the El Dorado hotel in Nevada City
Edwin B. Winans		1826–1894		politician	

== See also ==
- Chinese Americans in the California gold rush
- Women in the California gold rush
- Five Joaquins Gang, Mexican outlaw gang in California (1850–1853)
- Society of California Pioneers
- List of Californio people
