= Odd Fellows Cemetery =

Odd Fellows Cemetery may refer to:

- Odd Fellows Cemetery (Farmville, Virginia) where James W. D. Bland's gravesite is one of the notable burials
- IOOF Cemetery (Georgetown, Texas)
- Odd Fellows Cemetery (San Francisco), location of a Neptune Society Columbarium
- Odd Fellows Cemetery (Los Angeles)
- Odd Fellows Rest Cemetery, New Orleans, Louisiana, NRHP-listed, in Orleans Parish
- Odd Fellows and Confederate Cemetery, Grenada, Mississippi, NRHP-listed, in Grenada County
- Odd Fellows Cemetery (Starkville, Mississippi), NRHP-listed, in Oktibbeha County
- Odd Fellows' Cemetery Mound, Newtown, Ohio, NRHP-listed
- Medford IOOF Cemetery, Medford, Oregon, NRHP-listed
- Odd Fellows Cemetery (Philadelphia), Pennsylvania
- Oakwood Memorial Park (Santa Cruz, California), also known as Odd Fellows Cemetery (Paul Sweet Road, Santa Cruz)
- Santa Cruz Memorial Park, also known as Odd Fellows Cemetery (Ocean Street, Santa Cruz)

== See also ==
- List of Odd Fellows cemeteries
