= George Washington Dennis =

American businessperson (c. 1825–1916)

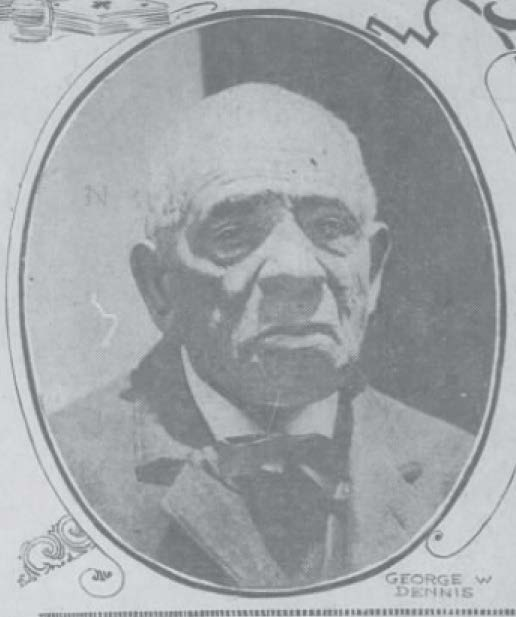
- George Washington Dennis from The San Francisco Call article, "Gambling in San Francisco in the Days of Gold as Seen by a Slave"
- Born: c. 1825; Mobile County, Alabama, United States
- Died: September 16, 1916 (aged 90–91); San Francisco, California, United States
- Resting place: Cypress Lawn Memorial Park, Colma, California, United States
- Other name: Geo. W. Dennis
- Occupations: Businessperson, entrepreneur, real estate investor, gambler, advocate for black rights, convention person
- Known for: One of San Francisco, California's wealthiest Black men in the 19th century
- Spouse: Margaret Ann Brown (m. 1855–1909; her death)
- Children: 11

George Washington Dennis (c. 1825 – September 16, 1916), was an American entrepreneur, real estate developer, and advocate for Black rights. He was African American, and born enslaved in Alabama; he came to California as chattel during the California gold rush. Dennis became one of San Francisco's wealthiest Black men in the late 19th-century and early-20th century, and fought against racial discrimination.

== Early life ==
George Washington Dennis was born on c. 1825, enslaved in Mobile County, Alabama. His birthdate listed on his funeral death record is March 12, 1825; his obituary in the San Francisco Chronicle listed his birthdate as February 1825. His mother was Black and enslaved; and his father was also his "owner" named Green Dennis, a White slave trader, gambler, and plantation owner from Mobile, Alabama.

== San Francisco, California ==
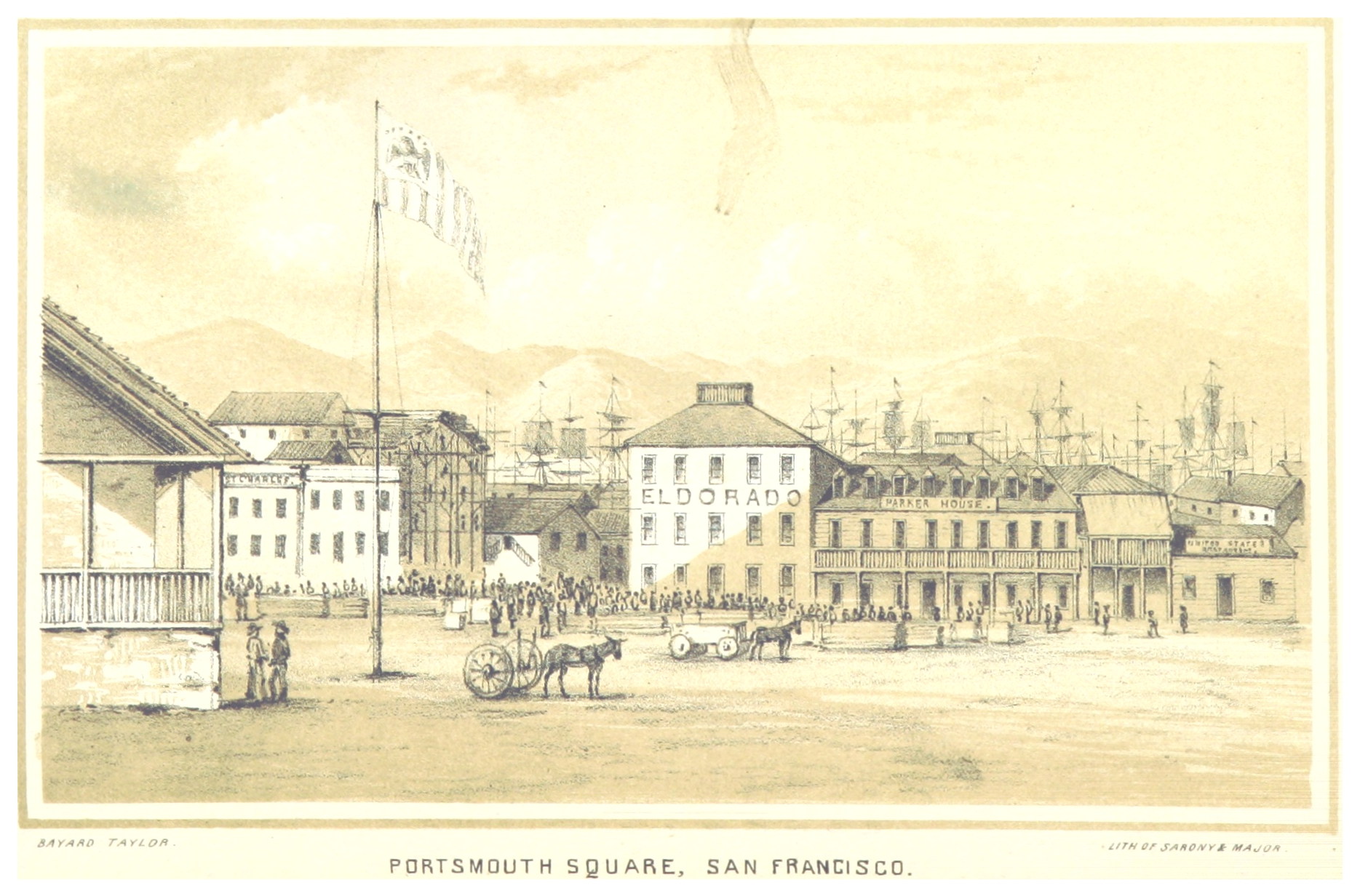
El Dorado Hotel c. 1850 in Portsmouth Square

Green Dennis brought George Washington Dennis as a chattel slave to San Francisco, during the California Gold Rush. When they reached New Orleans, the Dennis' joined together with a group of traveling gamblers on the ship. Along the journey, Green Dennis lost three times in his gambling, he bet on the chattel of his own son, and eventually "won" him back. The traveling group arrived in San Francisco, California in 1849. They arrived either in the summer or fall, however the month/day of his arrival varies in sources.

Green Dennis set up a gambling tent at the corner of Kearny Street and Washington Street in Portsmouth Square, San Francisco. Later the group of Dennis Sr. and the gamblers built the El Dorado Hotel in Portsmouth Square, and they had Dennis Jr. manned one gambling table in the daytime. In addition he received a monthly salary of USD $250, and worked as a hotel porter.

=== Freedom and business career ===
Dennis saved money from his work within four months of working at the hotel, and arrange manumission by agreeing to "purchase" freedom for himself and his mother. When California entered the Union as a free state in 1850 (mere months after his arrival, and prior to the American Civil War) slavery was forbidden in the state, however Black residents still faced discriminatory laws in education and employment, and they did not have the right to vote or testify against White people. As a freedman, Dennis rented one gambling table from his father, and his mother sold meals; together they made USD $225 a day (roughly worth USD $9,009 in 2024). While working at the gambling table and hotel, Dennis staked three claims with the Frazier Mining Company, all of which were unsuccessfully.

Dennis later owned several properties, as well as, the largest horse livery business in San Francisco. He supplied horses to the city of San Francisco. Dennis worked as a real estate developer in a partnership with Black journalist Mifflin Wistar Gibbs. He also owned a lumberyard and coal yard on Broadway Street in the city. Dennis was also a leader within the California State Convention of Colored Citizens, a part of the a Colored Conventions Movement. For 22 years, Dennis served as the messenger for the San Francisco Board of Harbor Commissioners (now known as the Port Commission), a role he was appointed to from the 19th California governor, James H. Budd.

In 1858, Dennis alongside other San Francisco abolitionists such as Peter Lester, and Mifflin Wistar Gibbs, worked to secure the services of a White legal team to fight for the freedom of Archy Lee, a former slave who was later part of a series of notable 19th-century court cases that defined civil rights in the state of California.

== Personal life ==
On June 21, 1855, Dennis married Margaret Ann Brown, from Baltimore, Maryland. Together they had eleven children. Their son George Washington Dennis Jr. was a lawyer and politician, who served as a delegate to the Democratic convention; their son Edward Dennis was the first Black police officer in San Francisco, within the San Francisco Police Department.

Dennis was friends with Mary Ellen Pleasant. His son, George Washington Dennis Jr. had been Pleasant's livery driver.

== Death ==
Dennis died on September 16, 1916, at his home at 2507 Bush Street in San Francisco, he was estimated to be age 91 years old. A week before his death he had an illness. He was buried at Cypress Lawn Memorial Park in Colma, California.

== See also ==
- African Americans in San Francisco
- List of people associated with the California Gold Rush
- History of slavery in California
