= Archy Lee =

American abolitionist (1840–1873)

- Born: 1840; Mississippi, United States
- Died: November 1873 (aged 32–33); Sacramento, California, United States
- Occupations: Abolitionist, formerly enslaved
- Known for: Archy Lee Case (1858)

Archy Lee (1840–1873), was an African American man born into enslavement; and was later part of a series of notable 19th-century court cases that defined civil rights in the state of California. In 1857, he was brought from Mississippi (a slave state) to Sacramento, California (a free state) and continued to work as if he was enslaved. He escaped while in California, but was later arrested and brought to a number of court trials. By April 14, 1858, he was legally declared a free man by the state of California. It was one of the most celebrated court cases related to slavery in the country, and was widely published.

== Biography ==
Archy Lee was born in 1840 in Mississippi, he was an African American born into slavery. Lee's slave owner, Charles Stovall, brought Lee with him to Sacramento, California on October 2, 1857. While in California, Stovall rented out Lee for his wages.

In January 1858, when Stovall decided to return to Mississippi, and Lee, age 18, escaped from Stovall while en route to the bay and went back to Sacramento. Lee took refuge in the home of Charles Hackett and Charles Parker, two politically active African Americans in Sacramento who operated a hotel, the Hackett House (on Third Street between K and L).

Stovall had Lee arrested, but a prominent civil rights attorney, Edwin B. Crocker defended Lee, and in decision on January 26, 1858, Judge Robert Robinson ruled that Lee was a free man because California was a free state and, though Mississippi was a slave state, Stovall had become permanent resident of California, and thus could not own slaves. San Francisco abolitionists Peter Lester, Mifflin Wistar Gibbs, and George Washington Dennis, had worked to secure the services of a White legal team to fight for the freedom of Lee.

Judge Robinson's decision was appealed to the California Supreme Court, however, and on February 11, 1858, the Court ruled that although California prohibited slave ownership for state residents, Stovall's inexperience and poor health warranted an exception that he be allowed to leave the state with Lee as his property. The Supreme Court decision was authored by Peter Burnett, who authored a bill banning African Americans from the State of Oregon as a legislator there, and who unsuccessfully urged the same bill in California while he was Governor. Justice Burnett's decision was joined by Justice David S. Terry, who would later fight for the Confederacy.

Californians were outraged by the California Supreme Court decision. On March 5, 1858, Stovall, although legally successful, tried to sneak Lee out of the state by boat. Abolitionists and San Francisco police discovered the plan and climbed aboard the Orizaba (ship) to rescue Lee. Stovall was arrested for kidnapping, a charge which challenged the California Supreme Court's decision that Lee was Stovall's property.

In March 1858, a federal court, the US District in San Francisco, overturned the California Supreme Court decision, holding that Lee was a free man.

Stovall then argued to United States Commissioner William Penn Johnson that Lee was in violation of the Fugitive Slave Act of 1850. On April 14, 1858, a final trial held that Lee had crossed no state lines to escape, and Lee was finally declared a free man. According to the Sacramento Daily Union, Archy Lee's case was the first case of the kind ever broached in California.

Some thought Lee took advantage of his freedom, and moved to Canada during the Fraser River Gold Rush in 1858. On November 6, 1873, Lee was found sick at the Yolo Bypass in Sacramento, California, he buried himself in the sand trying to keep warm after camping for an extended period, and was taken to the county hospital. Lee is thought to have died in the county hospital shortly after.

== Legacy ==
The book The Negro Trail Blazers of California (1919) by Delilah Beasley contains information about Lee. He was subject of the book, Archy Lee: A California Fugitive Slave Case (1969) by Rudolph M. Lapp, which was selected by the Book Club of California in spring of 1969.

== See also ==
- Dred Scott v. Sandford
- History of slavery in California
- Thomas Gilman (miner) (1830–1911)
- Alvin Aaron Coffey Sr. (1822–1902)
