= Elihu Anthony =

American clergyman and politician (1818–1905)

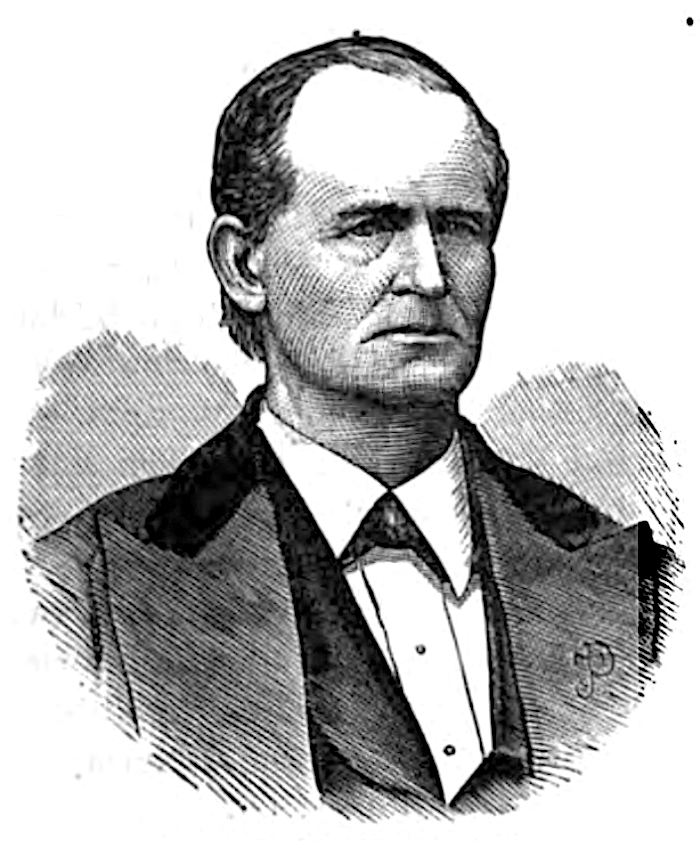
- Illustration published 1878

Member of the California State Assembly from the 6th district
- In office January 5, 1880 – January 3, 1881
- Preceded by: Multi-member district
- Succeeded by: Multi-member district

Personal details
- Born: November 30, 1818 Greenfield, New York, U.S.
- Died: August 15, 1905 (aged 86) Santa Cruz, California, U.S.
- Resting place: Santa Cruz Memorial Park
- Party: Workingmen's
- Spouse: Sarah A. Van Anda (m. 1845–1898)
- Occupation: Alcalde, California pioneer, blacksmith, industrialist, abolitionist, minister
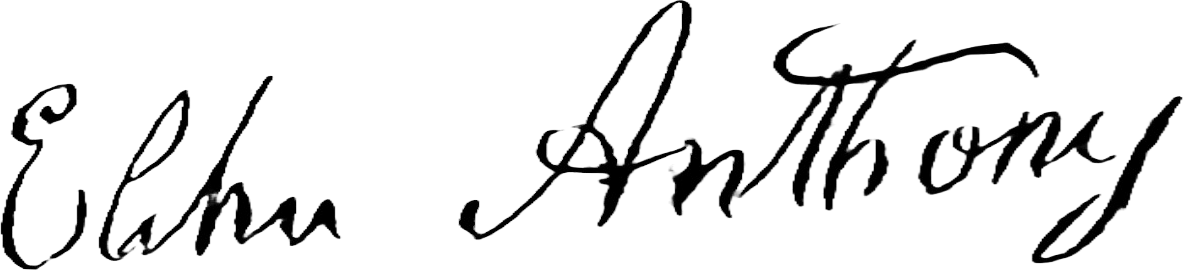
- Signature

Elihu Anthony (November 30, 1818 – August 15, 1905) was an American alcalde, blacksmith, industrialist, abolitionist, postmaster, and minister. He is considered a founding father of the city of Santa Cruz. He also served as a member of the California State Assembly from 1880 to 1881. Despite his earlier abolitionism, he was active within the anti-Chinese movement.

== Early life ==
Born November 30, 1818, in Greenfield, in Saratoga County, New York to Asa and Sarah (née Odell) Anthony, they moved often in his childhood and eventually landed in Indiana. His family were Quakers and he was raised as a Quaker.

Prior to moving West, Anthony worked in Indiana as a Methodist minister. In 1845, Anthony married Sarah A. Van Anda in at Fort Wayne, Indiana.

== Career ==
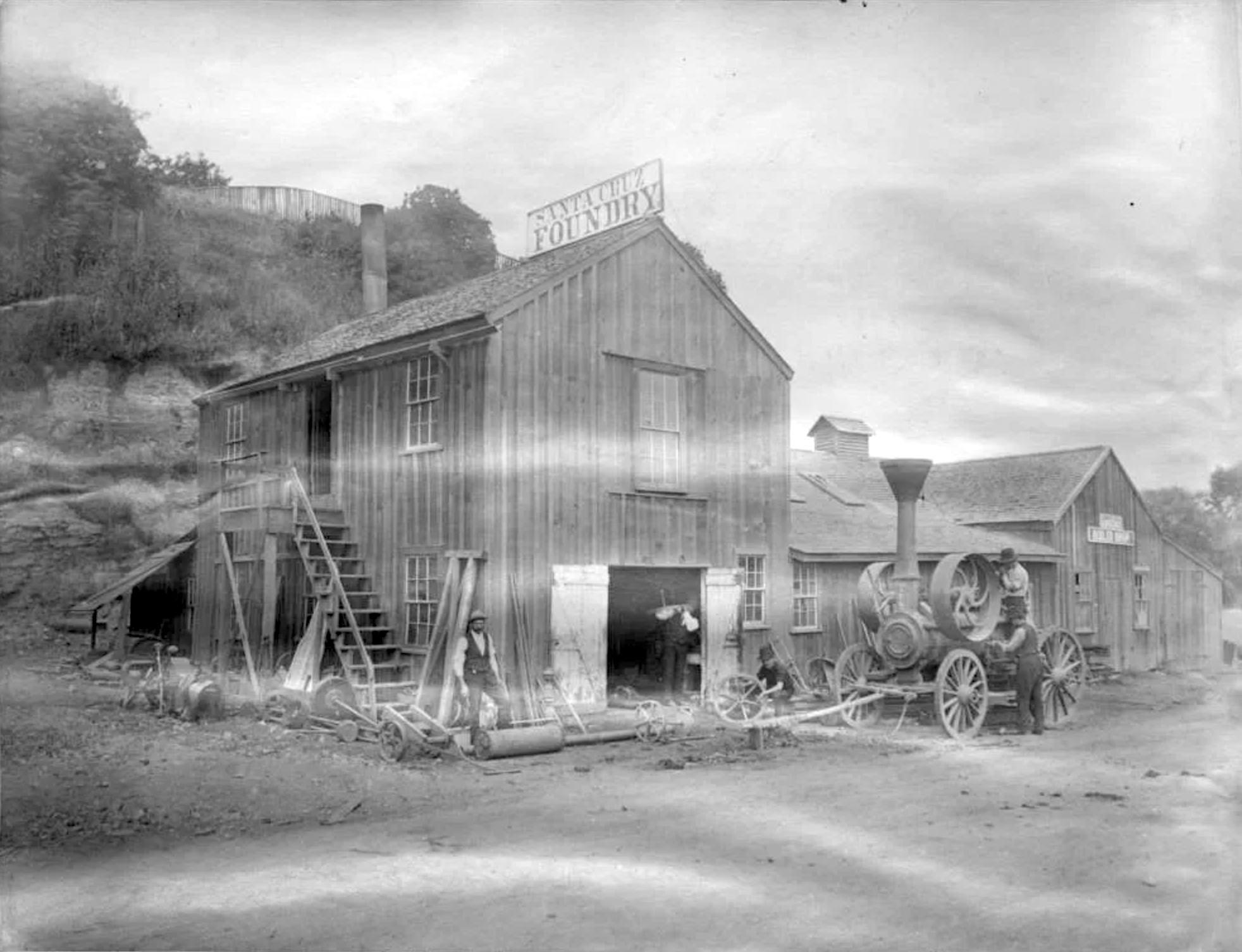
Elihu Anthony's Santa Cruz Foundry (1879), Santa Cruz, California

The family emigrated in 1847 on the Oregon Trail, leaving the main route for California. They took a Northern route of travel and decided to change course and head to California, despite the danger and crossing Donner Pass where one year prior in November 1846, the Donner family had died. They were hungry and struggled but made the journey and first arriving at Sutter's Fort, and later at the Pueblo of San Jose (later known as the city of San Jose, California). His son Bascom F. Anthony was born at the Mission San José upon their arrival in September 1847. Anthony helped establish the San Jose First United Methodist Church the same year, founded in 1847.

Anthony arrived in Santa Cruz between December 1847 and January 1848 to work as a local Methodist Episcopal Church preacher. In the early years he bought a 18-acre lot of land, for which he held the title Alcalde. His land spanned what is now the downtown of Santa Cruz (the main area of the lot was near what is now the junction of Mission Street, Water Street and N. Pacific Avenue in downtown, the building no longer exists) and eventually developed the first commercial block in Santa Cruz called the Anthony Block. He built the first business, a blacksmith shop named the Santa Cruz Foundry, and sawmill that later became a general store. He invested in building real estate on a hill called "Anthony's Bluff" since uneven land was less preferred by the local Native Americans. When the Gold rush started in 1848, Anthony started manufacturing the pickaxes and other tools for mining, and since there were a limited amount of ironworkers in California during this time he made a great profit.

In 1849 Anthony help build with industrialist Henry Cowell the first wharf, Cowell Wharf which was primarily used for shipping lumber and lime. It was later preceded by six other wharfs in a similar location, currently the only remaining one is the Santa Cruz Wharf.

He was an abolitionist and a supporter of the Union Army during the American Civil War from 1861 until 1865. Anthony had helped support the African American community of Santa Cruz, which was small and struggling. He had worked to ensured all schools were fully integrated.

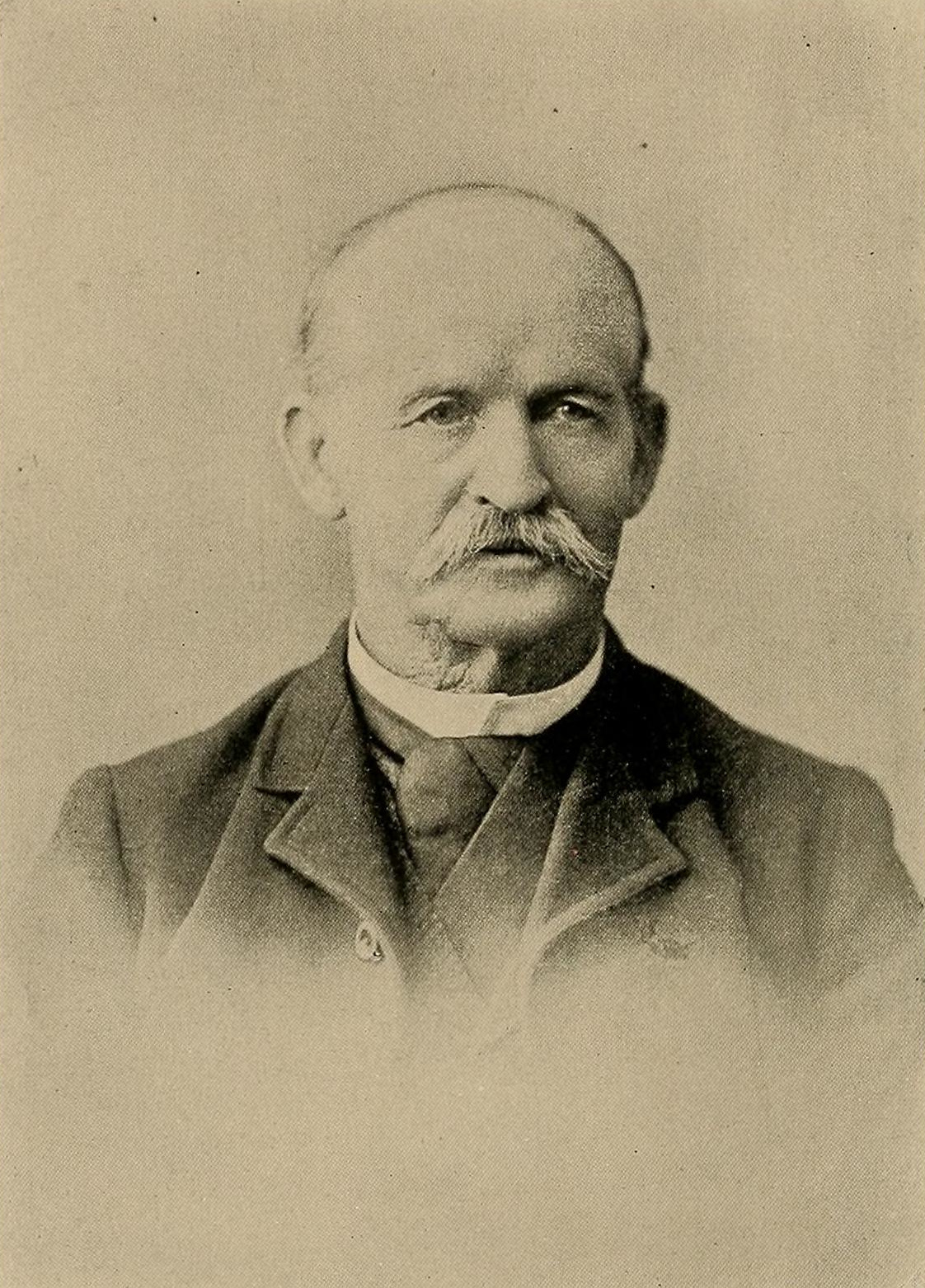
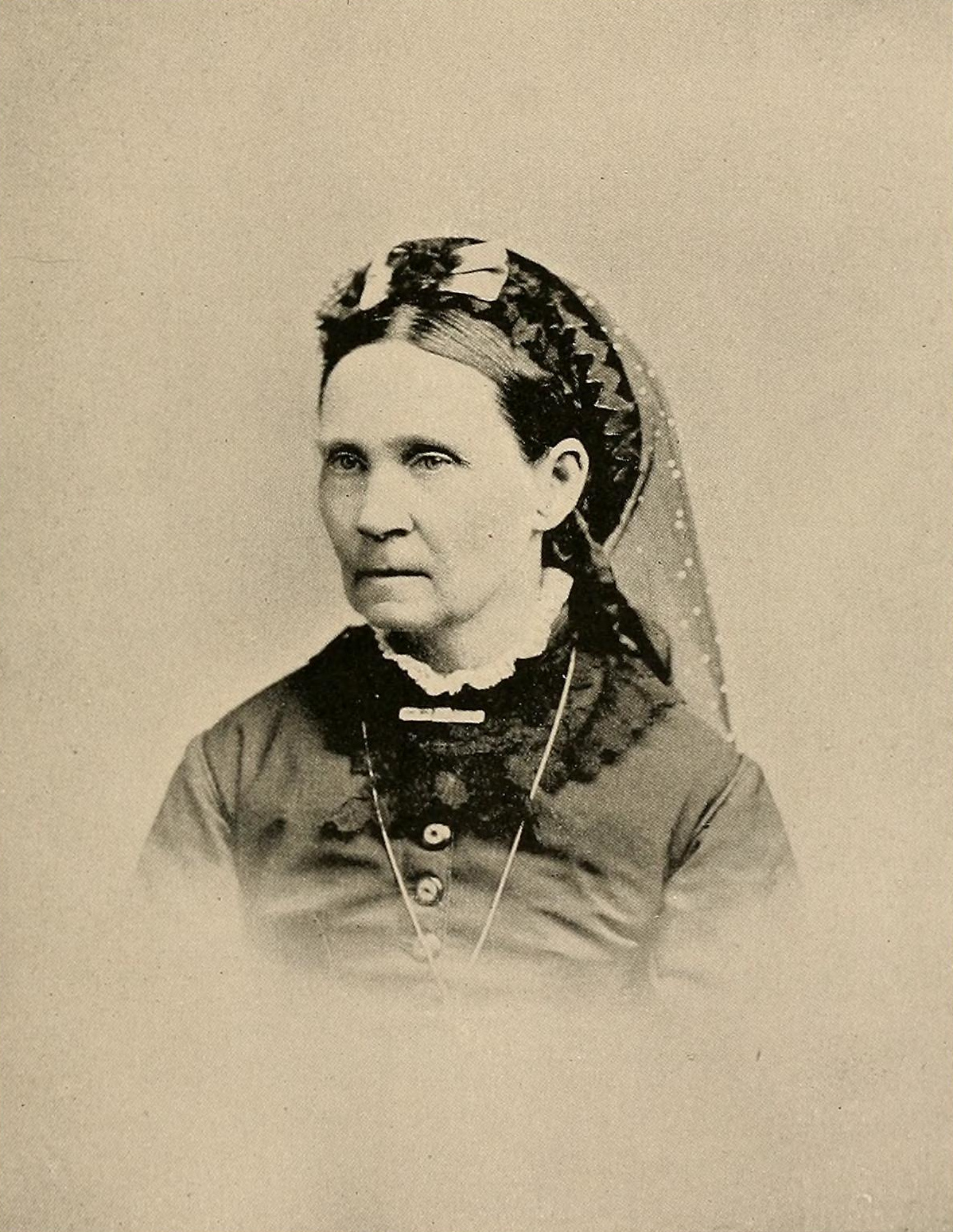
Anthony and his wife Sarah c. 1892

Starting in 1865, Anthony with Frederick A. Hihn built the first private water supply network in the city of Santa Cruz and serving nearby communities.

Anthony was a member of the anti-Chinese Workingmen's Party of California, serving as president of the Santa Cruz Workingmen's Club. Although the party withered away in 1881 and the Chinese Exclusion Act was passed in 1882, by 1885 the Santa Cruz club remained as a larger movement called the "Non-Partisan Anti-Chinese Association" headed by Anthony and Duncan McPherson, editor and publisher of the Santa Cruz Sentinel, which spread down the coast to local cities and towns. They pursued blatantly racist ordinances aimed at shutting down Chinese laundries.

== Death ==
He died on August 15, 1905, at age 86, and is buried in Santa Cruz Memorial Park cemetery.

== See also ==
- Santa Cruz Museum of Art and History
- List of people associated with the California Gold Rush
