= Alvin Aaron Coffey Sr. =

American miner (1822–1902)

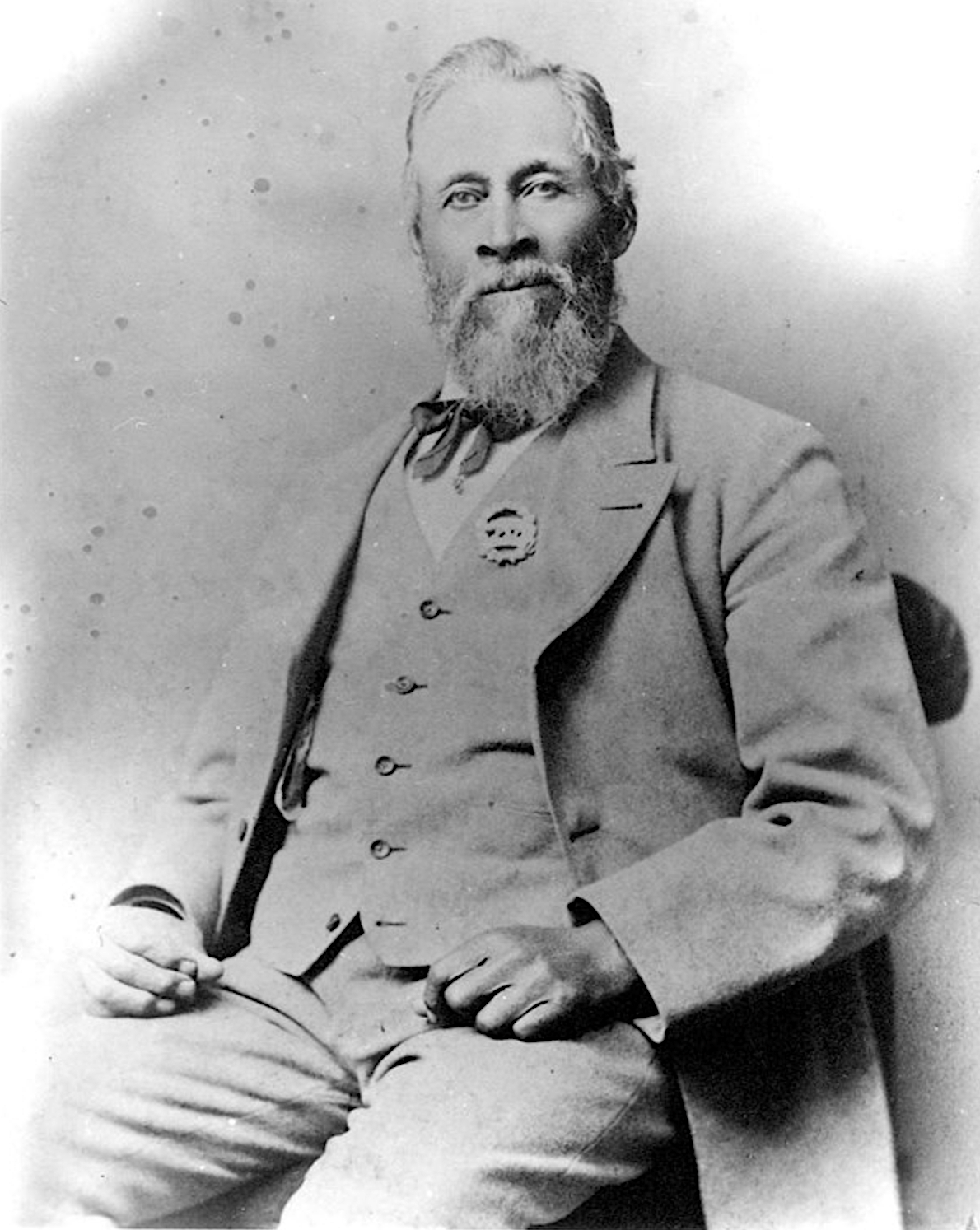
- Born: July 14, 1822; Mason County, Kentucky, U.S.
- Died: October 28, 1902 (aged 80); Alameda County, California, U.S.
- Burial place: Oak Hill Cemetery, Red Bluff, California, U.S.
- Occupations: Pioneer, homesteader, miner, farmer, businessperson
- Spouse: Mahala Tindall
- Children: 5

Alvin Aaron Coffey Sr. (1822–1902) was an American pioneer, homesteader, miner, and farmer in California; who was formerly enslaved. He is the only Black member of the California Society of Pioneers.

== Early life ==
Alvin Aaron Coffey was born enslaved on July 14, 1822, in Mason County, Kentucky, and owned by Margaret Cooke and her family. His parents were Nellie Cooke and Lewis (Larkin) Coffey. He was sold by his enslaver to a slave broker when he reached the age of 12, and moved to Missouri.

At the age of 24 he ended up living enslaved with Dr. William Bassett of St. Joseph, Missouri.

== California gold rush and manumission ==
In 1849 by age of 27, Bassett forced Coffey with him to California in order to work as a gold miner during the California gold rush for Bassett. Coffey left behind his wife and children in Missouri. He started taking side jobs to make money, including managing the oxen, and driving the wagons. Bassett hired Coffey's labor out and kept the money that he earned, working as a cobbler, laundryman, and miner. Coffey wrote in his memoir he had considered escaping while in California, but was concerned his situation could worsen if he was caught.

In 1853, Bassett and Coffey returned to Missouri where he sold him to Mary Tindell for $1,000. Coffey returned to California in 1854 with Ben Tindell, the son of Mary. He convinced the Tindell family he could work at gold mining to pay his manumission fee of $1,000. Coffey also earned extra money along the way working odd jobs. He remained in California with Tindell until 1857, working mines in Shasta and Sutter, and was able to buy freedom for his entire family.

== Career ==
Coffey returned to Missouri to collect his wife and five children (two daughter and three sons). With the help of a lawyer, it took a few months for the family to be legally manumitted. In April 1857, the family set out for Shasta County, California, leaving two daughters with their grandparent in Ontario, Canada. The family settled in Red Bluff, California, where they worked as farmers, raised turkey, and were laundry operators. In 1860, Coffey brought his daughters to Red Bluff, via the Isthmus of Panama.

== Late life and death ==
In 1887, Coffey was inducted by the Society of California Pioneers, he is only African American to hold this title.

He died on October 28, 1902, at the Home for Aged and Infirm Colored People of California in Beulah, California (now part of Oakland, California). He was buried at Oak Hill Cemetery in Red Bluff.

The Book of Reminiscences includes his personal written account of coming to California.

== See also ==
- African Americans in the East Bay (San Francisco Bay Area)
- History of slavery in California
- List of people associated with the California Gold Rush
