= Harry Huskey =

American computer design pioneer (1916–2017)

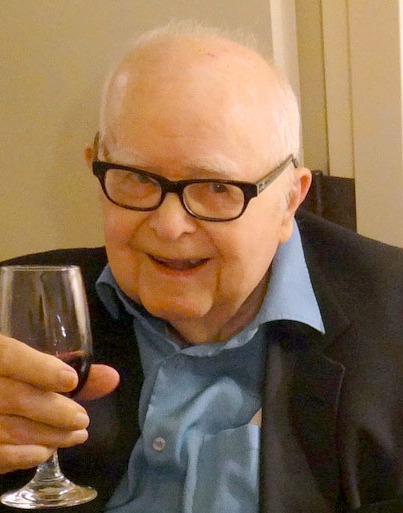
- Harry Huskey in 2011
- Born: Harry Douglas Huskey; January 19, 1916; Whittier, North Carolina, U.S.
- Died: April 9, 2017 (aged 101); Santa Cruz, California, U.S.
- Education: Ohio State University (Master & PhD); University of Idaho (Bachelor)
- Spouse(s): Velma Roeth (died 1991); Nancy Grindstaff (m. 1994, died 2015)
- Awards: ACM Fellow (1994); Computer History Museum Fellow (2013)
- Scientific career
- Fields: Mathematics
- Workplaces: University of California; University of Pennsylvania
- Thesis: Contributions to the Problem of Geocze (1943)
- Doctoral students: Butler Lampson; Niklaus Wirth

Harry Douglas Huskey (January 19, 1916 – April 9, 2017) was an American computer design pioneer.

== Early life and career ==
Huskey was born in Whittier, in the Smoky Mountains region of North Carolina and grew up in Idaho. He received his bachelor's degree in mathematics and physics at the University of Idaho. He was the first member of his family to attend college. He gained his Master's and then his PhD in 1943 from the Ohio State University on Contributions to the Problem of Geöcze. Huskey taught mathematics to U.S. Navy students at the University of Pennsylvania and then worked part-time on the early ENIAC and EDVAC computers in 1945. This work represented his first formal introduction to computers, according to his obituary in The New York Times.

He visited the National Physical Laboratory (NPL) in the United Kingdom for a year and worked on the Pilot ACE computer with Alan Turing and others. He was also involved with the EDVAC and SEAC computer projects.

Huskey designed and managed the construction of the Standards Western Automatic Computer (SWAC) at the National Bureau of Standards in Los Angeles (1949–1953). He also designed the G-15 computer for Bendix Aviation Corporation, a 950 pounds (430 kg) machine, operable by one person. He had one at his home that is now in the Smithsonian Institution in Washington, D.C.

After five years at the National Bureau of Standards, Huskey joined the faculty of the University of California, Berkeley in 1954 and then University of California, Santa Cruz from 1966. He cofounded the computer and information science program at UC Santa Cruz in 1967. He became director of its computer center. In 1986, UC Santa Cruz named him professor emeritus. While at Berkeley, he supervised the research of pioneering programming language designer Niklaus Wirth, who gained his PhD in 1963. During 1963-1964 Prof. Huskey participated in establishing the Computer Center at IIT Kanpur and convened a meeting there with many pioneers of computing technology. Participants included Forman Acton of Princeton University, Robert Archer of Case Institute of Technology, S. Barton of CDC, Australia, S. Beltran from the Centro de Calculo in Mexico City, John Makepeace Bennett of the University of Sydney, Launor Carter of SDC - author of the subsequent Carter Report on Computer Technology for Schools, David Evans of UC Berkeley, Bruce Gilchrist of IBM-SBC, Clay Perry of UC San Diego, Sigeiti Moriguti of the University of Tokyo, Gio Wiederhold, also of UC Berkeley, Adriaan van Wijngaarden of the Mathematisch Centrum in Amsterdam, Maurice Wilkes of Cambridge University.

Huskey was Professor Emeritus at the University of California after his retirement at the age of 70 in 1986. In 1994 he was inducted as a Fellow of the Association for Computing Machinery. Dag Spicer, senior curator at the Computer History Museum in Mountain View, California, "described Dr. Huskey as a 'Zelig-like character, present at some of computing's greatest moments.'"

== Personal life ==
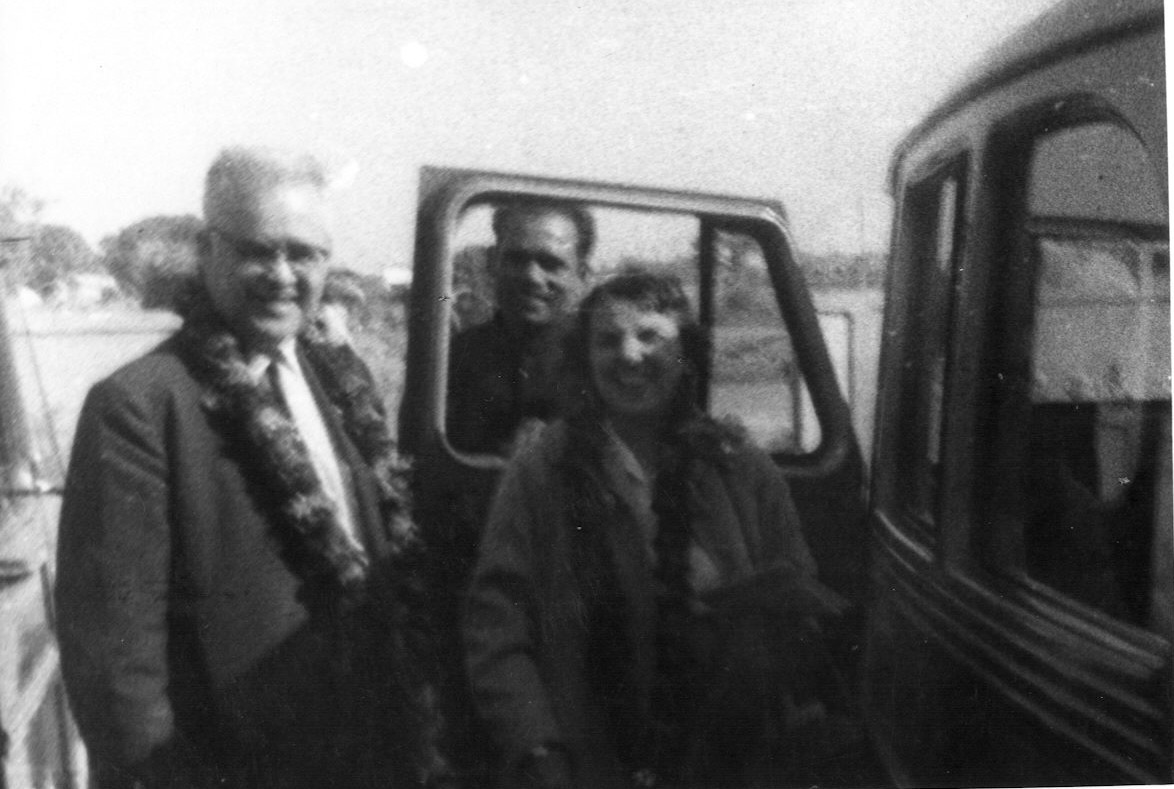
Harry Huskey (left) with his wife Velma at an outing to temples in Khajuraho, Madhya Pradesh

Huskey married Velma Roeth (died 1991) in 1939 and had four children. In 1994, he married Nancy Grindstaff (died in 2016). He lived in Santa Cruz, California.

Huskey appeared with a junk dealer as the third pair of contestants in the 10 May 1950 episode of Groucho Marx's radio show You Bet Your Life. He was described as the designer of an "electronic brain". They selected the "state category" and missed the final question when they failed to identify Iowa as the state north of Missouri.

== Selected works ==
- Huskey, H. D. Harry D. Huskey: His Story. BookSurge Publishing, 2004. ISBN 1-59457-680-7.
- Huskey, H. D. The ACE Test Assembly, the Pilot ACE, the Big ACE, and the Bendix G15. In Copeland, B. J., Alan Turing's Automatic Computing Engine, chapter 13, pages 281–295. Oxford University Press, 2005. ISBN 0-19-856593-3.
- Huskey, H. D. The state of the art in electronic digital computing in Britain and the United States (1947). In Copeland, B. J., Alan Turing's Automatic Computing Engine, chapter 23, pages 529–540. Oxford University Press, 2005. ISBN 0-19-856593-3.
- (with Huskey, Velma R). Lady Lovelace and Charles Babbage. 1980 Annals of the History of Computing (Volume: 2, Issue: 4 )

== Awards ==
In 2013, the Computer History Museum named him a Museum Fellow "for his seminal work on early and important computing systems and a lifetime of service to computer education."
