= Shaw's Flat, California =

Historical place in Tuolumne County, United States

- Location within California Location within the United States
- 38.00369°N 120.40143°W
- Location: Shaw's Flat Rd and Mt. Brow Rd, Columbia, California.

History
- Built: 1850, 177 years ago

Site notes
- Architectural style: mining town

California Historical Landmark
- Designated: March 8, 1948
- Reference no.: 395

Shaw's Flat is a historical ghost town and mining town in Columbia in Tuolumne County, California, United States. The site of Shaw's Flat is a California Historical Landmark (No. 395), listed on March 8, 1948.

== History ==
Shaw's Flat was 49 California Gold Rush town founded in 1850. The town is named after it first settler, Mandeville Shaw. In November 1849, Shaw started an orchard on the eastern slope of Table Mountain. The California Gold Rush started shortly after Shaw's. Nearby Tarleton Caldwell, started Caldwell's Gardens by growing black walnut. Caldwell found gold on his land. James G. Fair found gold and went on to be a United States senator. Thomas Gilman was an enslaved African American from Tennessee who arrived in California during the gold rush, and was able to self-purchase his freedom two years later from mining at Dragoon Gluch; he lived in Shaw's Flat for most of his life.

The California Historical Marker at the site reads:

"In 1850 this community was alive with gold miners. James D. Fair, after whom the Fairmont Hotel in San Francisco is named, was one of the most notable. The Mississippi House, built in 1850, contains many relics including the original bar and post office with its grill and mailboxes. On a nearby hill stands the old bell, given by miners, which summoned men to work and announced the convening of various courts. According to tradition, a local bartender added to his income by panning the gold dust dropped on his muddy boots as he served customers."

A historical Shaw's Flat marker is at the Southeast corner of Shaw's Flat Road and Mt. Brow Road. The marker was placed there by Historic Landmark Committee and Tuolumne Parlor No. 144, Native Sons of the Golden West in 1947.

== See also ==
- California Historical Landmarks in Tuolumne County
