= Thomas Gilman (miner) =

American freedman and Californian historical person (1830–1911)

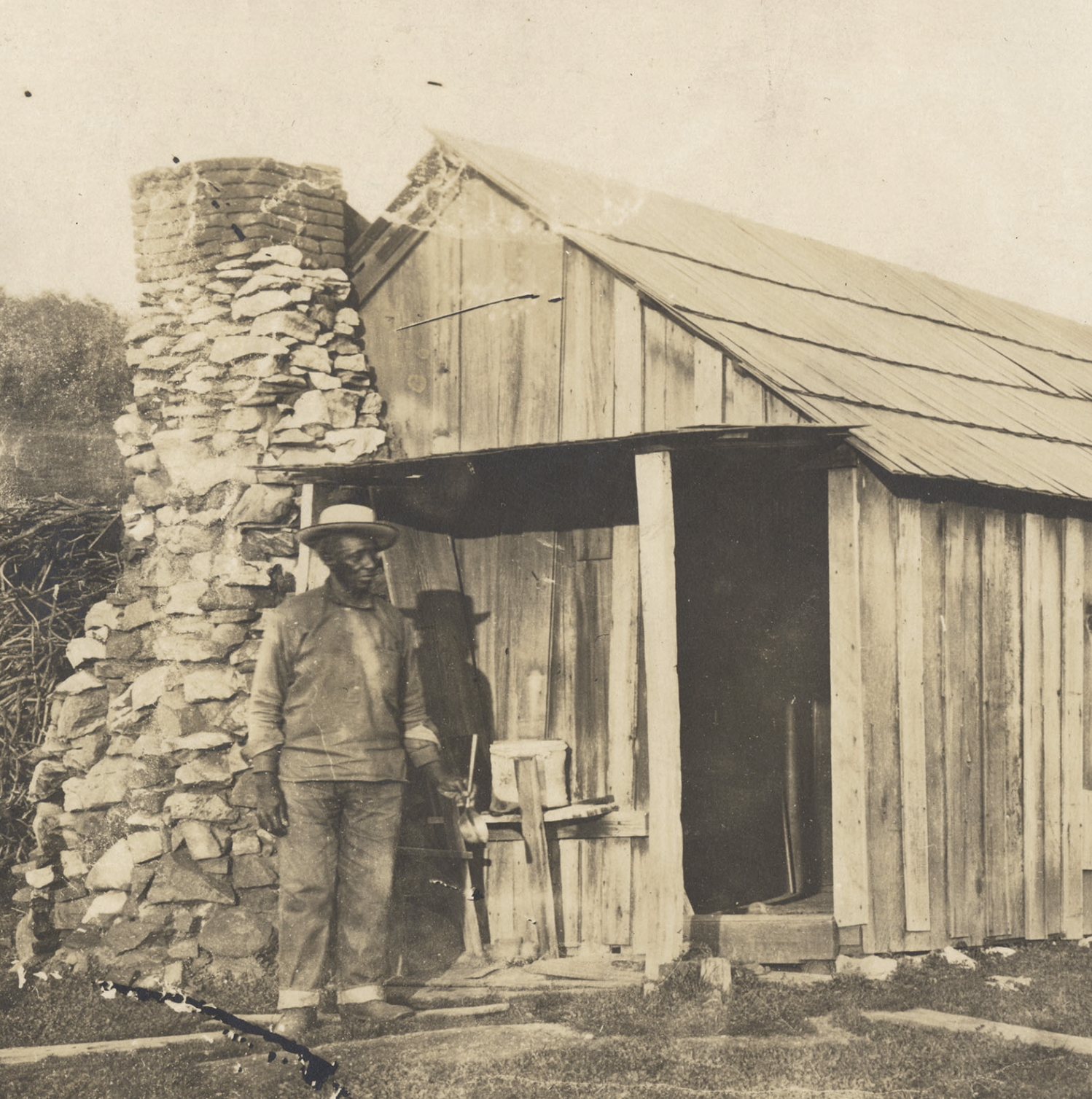
- Gilman (c. 1900) in front of his cabin in at Shaw's Flat, California
- Born: 1830; Tennessee, United States
- Died: December 15, 1911 (aged 80–81); Shaw's Flat, Tuolumne County, California, United States
- Burial place: Shaw's Flat Cemetery
- Other name: Uncle Tom Gilman
- Occupations: Miner, farmer, businessperson
- Known for: Freedman, and his contribution to Black history in California

Thomas Gilman (1830–1911), nicknamed Uncle Tom Gilman, was an American freedman, miner, farmer, and businessperson. He was an enslaved African American who self–purchased his freedom from mining during the mid-19th century, and notably contributed to African American history in California.

== Biography ==
Thomas Gilman was Black and born enslaved in 1830, in Tennessee, U.S. He was owned and enslaved by Joseph B. Gilman of Greene County, Tennessee. Thomas was brought to California by his enslaver in 1850, during the California gold rush, in order to work in the mines in Dragoon Gulch. After two years of mining, he was able to purchase his freedom; however, Joseph Gilman continuously tried to delay his manumission, until the self–purchase was finally recorded by the state court in August 1852.

Gilman spent the remainder of his life in Tuolumne County in his small cabin located on the Sonora–Shaws Flat Road, where he engaged in mining and farming. He never learned to read or write. When he reached an age at which he could no longer farm, his local friends supported him. Not all freedman in California were able to live such long and peaceful lives.

Gilman died at age 85 on December 15, 1911, in Shaw's Flat, and he is buried at the Shaw's Flat Cemetery.

== Legacy ==
The California State Library holds the Thomas Gilman Papers, 1853–1907. "Uncle Toms Drive" in Sonora, California was named in his honor.

== See also ==
- Archy Lee (1840–1873)
- History of slavery in California
