= Velma Huskey =

American computing historian (1917–1991)

- Born: Velma Elizabeth Roeth; October 8, 1917; Houston, Ohio, U.S.
- Died: January 16, 1991 (aged 73); Miami, Florida, U.S.
- Resting place: Santa Cruz Memorial Park; 36°59′15.5″N 122°01′39″W
- Education: Ohio State University (BA)
- Spouse: Harry Huskey
- Writing career
- Subject: History of computing

Velma Elizabeth Huskey (née Roeth; October 8, 1917 – January 16, 1991) was a pioneer in early computing and author of several important papers on the history of computing.

== Early life and education ==
Velma Elizabeth Roeth was born October 8, 1917, in Houston, Ohio. She was the daughter of German-American farmers Frederick William Roeth and Clara Matilda Fessler. She attended Houston High School, where she wrote and edited the school news column published in The Piqua Daily Call. She entered Ohio University in 1937.

After marrying Harry Huskey in 1939, Velma Huskey earned a B.A. in English from Ohio State University in 1942. There she was inducted into Phi Beta Kappa.

== Career ==
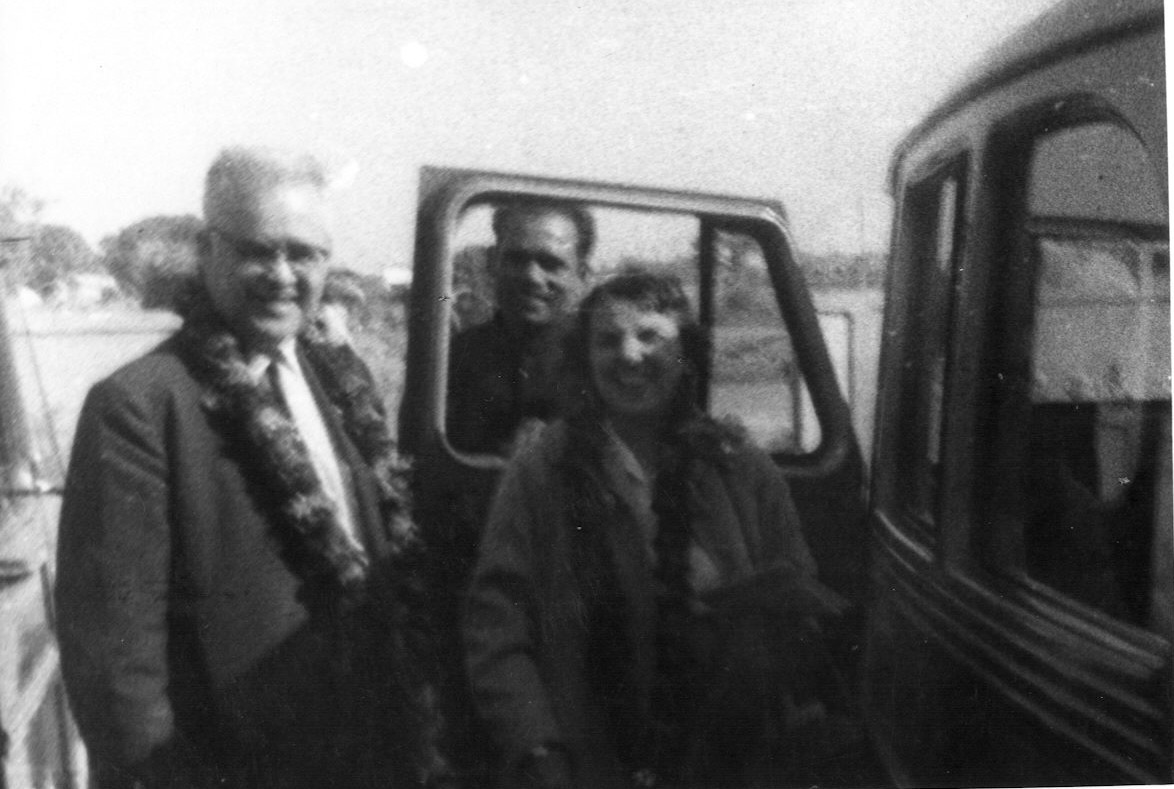
Velma Huskey (right) with her husband Harry at an outing to temples in Khajuraho, Madhya Pradesh

Huskey worked as an information specialist for the National Bureau of Standards from 1948 to 1952. She became a technical writer at the Institute for Numerical Analysis at UCLA. Along with her husband, she was an editor for the IEEE Transactions on Computers. She traveled to the Soviet Union for the 1959 technical delegation in computers, paying her own way while her husband represented the Association for Computing Machinery. In 1967 the Huskeys moved to Santa Cruz, California.

Huskey was a biographer of Ada Lovelace. She studied letters in the Byron and Lovelace collection of the Bodleian Libraries at the University of Oxford during summer visits. Her writings appeared in the IEEE Annals of the History of Computing.

== Personal life and death ==
She married Harry Huskey in 1939 and they had four children.

Huskey died January 16, 1991, in Miami, Florida. She was buried at Santa Cruz Memorial Park in Santa Cruz, California.
