= Kentucky Ridge Mine =

Gold mine in Nevada County, California, United States

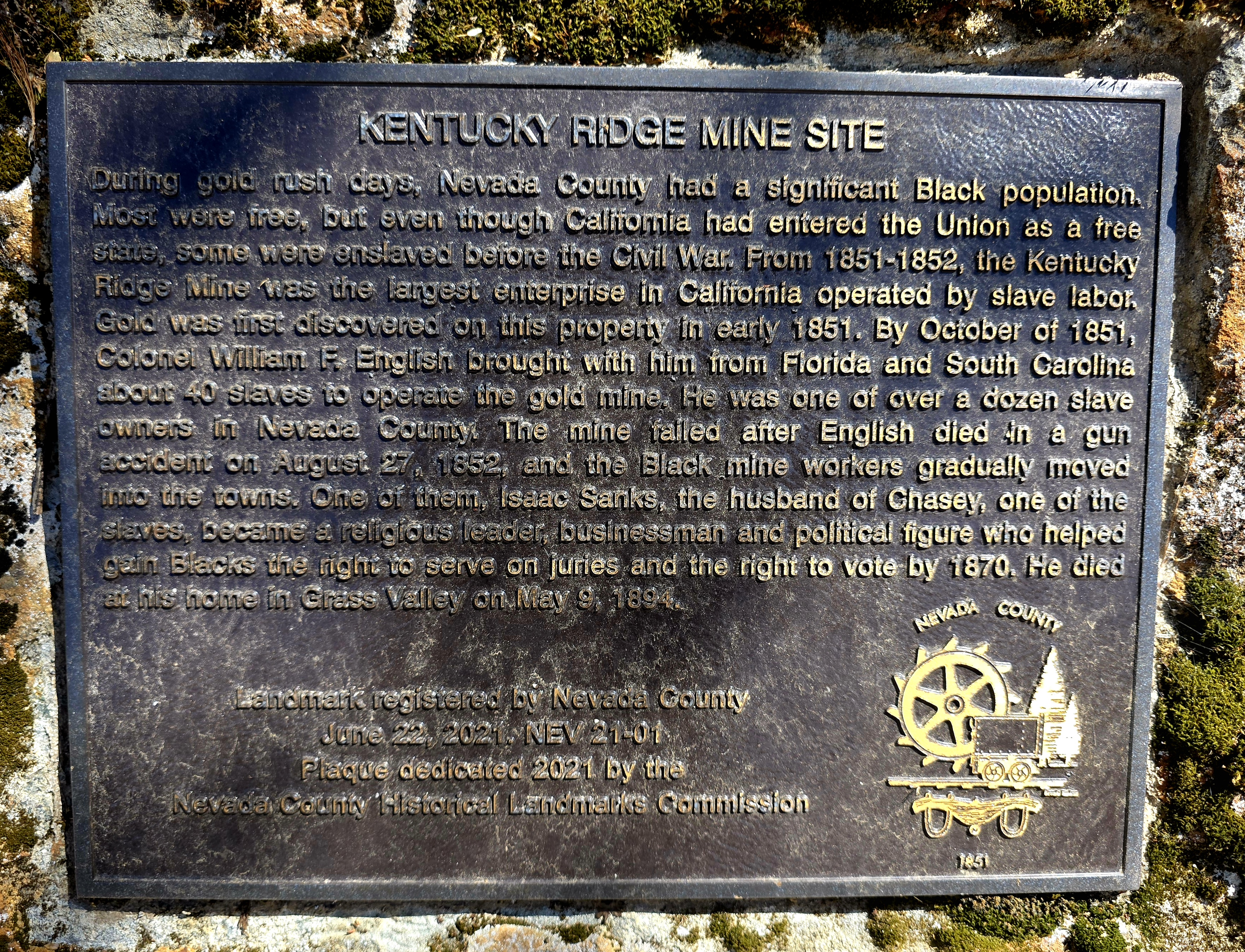
Kentucky Ridge Mine Site historical marker

The Kentucky Ridge Mine, sometimes called the Old Slave Mine, was a gold mine in Nevada County, California that was in operation in 1851 and 1852. It was the largest business enterprise in California that utilized African-American slave labor. The business closed after its owner, William F. English, was killed in a gunfire incident, and the slaves then became free, many of them remaining in Nevada County for decades.

== Mine operation ==
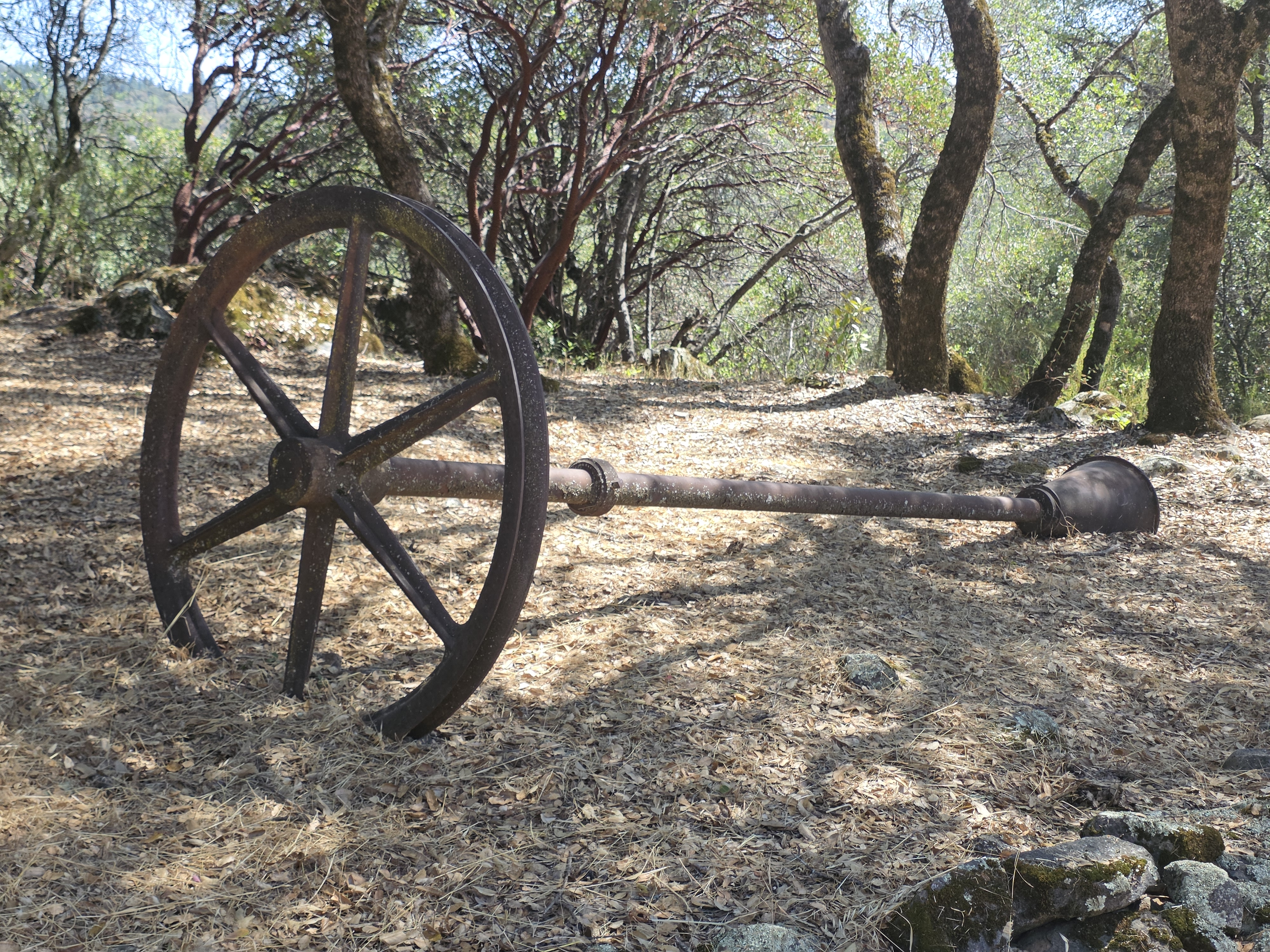
Kentucky Ridge Mine equipment

The mine relied on the labor of 30 to 45 slaves who had been brought to California from South Carolina and Florida by English and his uncle Richard Fitzpatrick. From the beginning of operations, the mine used a water powered two wheel Chilean process quartz mill to crush gold bearing rock. The mill was capable of crushing up to 2-1/2 tons of ore per day. English and his slaves lacked practical experience with gold mining. Writing 16 years later, local historian Edwin F. Bean wrote that the "affair proved a failure, and was disastrous to all parties concerned" and that mining in the Kentucky Ridge area was a “bubble” that left participants "flat broke". In 1949, mining engineer Edward Kinyon described the mine as "a deep tunnel of amazing deviations and windings" and said that local miners compared it "to a hole chopped out with pickaxes". Kinyon said that it was called the "Old Slave Mine" locally, and concluded that "it has never been a producer of more than casual note."

== William F. English ==
The mine developer, William F. English, was born in South Carolina in 1807 to a family of prosperous slaveowning cotton planters. He established several businesses in the Florida Keys and later in what became the city of Miami. Before Florida became a state, he served in the Legislative Council of the Territory of Florida from 1840 to 1844, and after statehood, was elected to the Florida Senate in 1848, representing Dade County. He also served in a Florida militia unit, with the rank of colonel.

In the 1830s, English's uncle, Richard Fitzpatrick, established a citrus and sugarcane plantation on the north shore of the Miami River, near its mouth. In 1838, the US Army leased some land from Fitzpatrick to establish Fort Dallas due to the intermittent combat of the Seminole Wars in the area, which went on for years. English bought the plantation from his uncle in 1842 and operated it with about 100 slaves, raising tobacco, cotton and indigo.

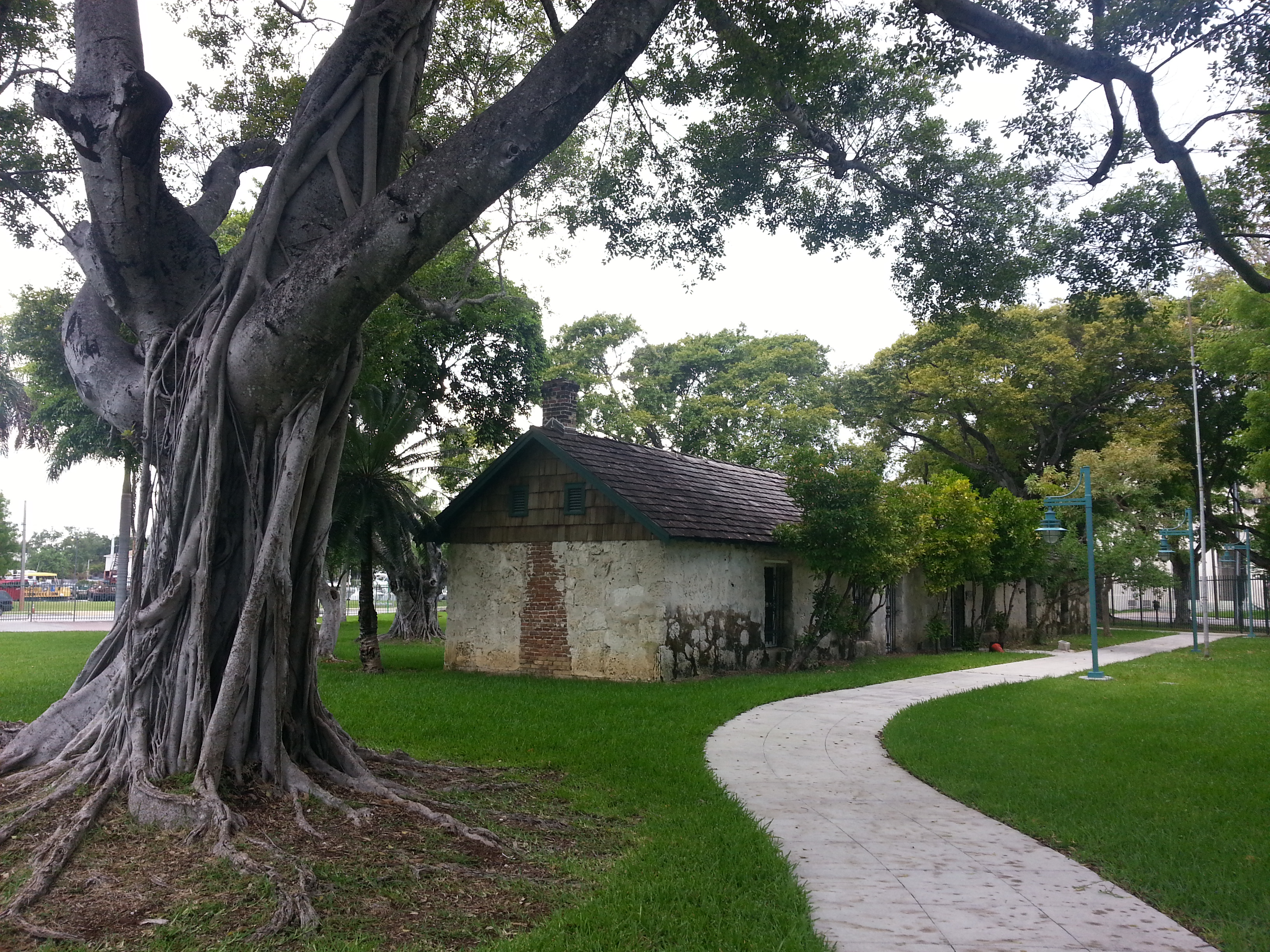
Fort Dallas slave quarters/barracks built by William F. English and his slaves in what is now Miami, Florida

He built stone slave's quarters that later became army barracks, that still stand in a relocated spot in Lummus Park in Miami. Fighting resumed between the Seminoles and American settlers in 1849, and the army requisitioned English's plantation to expand Fort Dallas. English then developed a plan to join the California Gold Rush.

English ordered construction of a steamship, the Commodore Stockton, in Philadelphia. Built by the Davis and Burton shipyard, it was a wooden side-wheel steamer with two decks and three masts. It weighed 435 tons and was 154 feet long. The ship was launched in January, 1850, and he then used his slaves to outfit the interior. He waited for news from California, which was admitted to the union as a free state in September, 1850. Even so, English decided to proceed with his plan and his ship sailed for California in November and arrived the following April, with approximately 36 slaves on board in addition to dozens of other passengers.

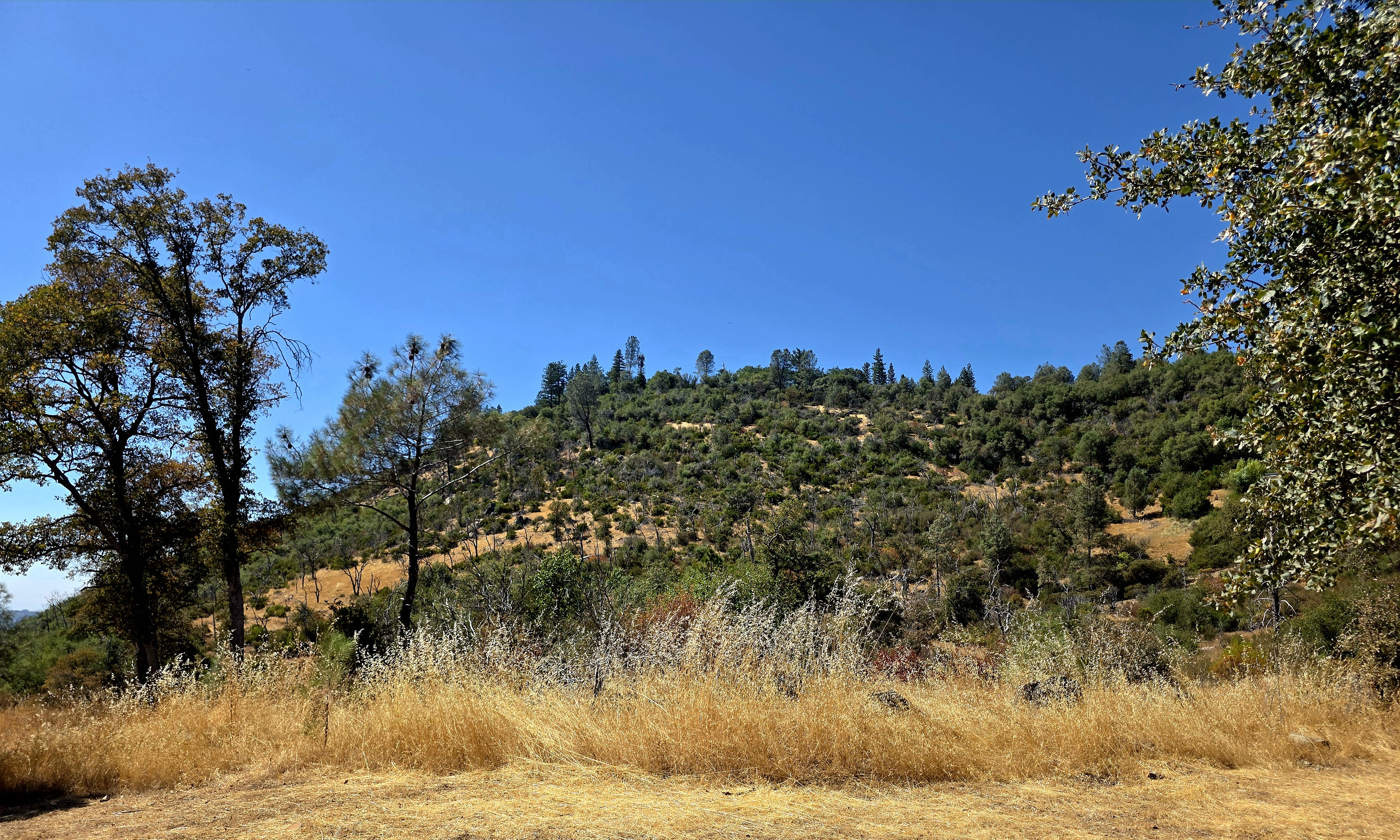
View of Kentucky Ridge

In early 1851, California newspapers reported that gold had been discovered on the Kentucky Ridge in Nevada County, located between the mining communities of Rough and Ready and Newtown. By October, 1851, English owned the Kentucky Ridge Mine and was mining there with slave labor.

English encountered financial problems. A massive fire in San Francisco destroyed a large quantity of retail goods that English had stored in a warehouse there. His ship the Commodore Stockton had mechanical problems when sailing from Panama to California and had to dock in Acapulco for months. English could not afford to pay the associated costs and lost the ship. The incident caused serious diplomatic tension between the United States and Mexico and the arrest of the US consul in Acapulco, Francis W. Rice.

English fell off his mule on August 27, 1852, near Nevada City, California. When he tried to get up, his gun went off, killing him instantly. Edwin F. Bean speculated that it may have been suicide, since his businesses were the subject of litigation. His uncle, Richard Fitzpatrick had accompanied him to California and helped wrap up English’s estate, according to a legal notice published October 1, 1852. In November, the mine equipment was being sold, and the Kentucky Ridge mine was out of business.

== Freedom and aftermath ==
After English died, his slaves became free. A few of them continued trying to mine for gold on Kentucky Ridge. Others moved to Boston Ravine near Grass Valley, where gold mining was flourishing in the early 1850s. Some of them stayed in the area for decades, and Grass Valley had a thriving black community throughout the 19th century that established an African Methodist Episcopal Church, an associated school and other community institutions.

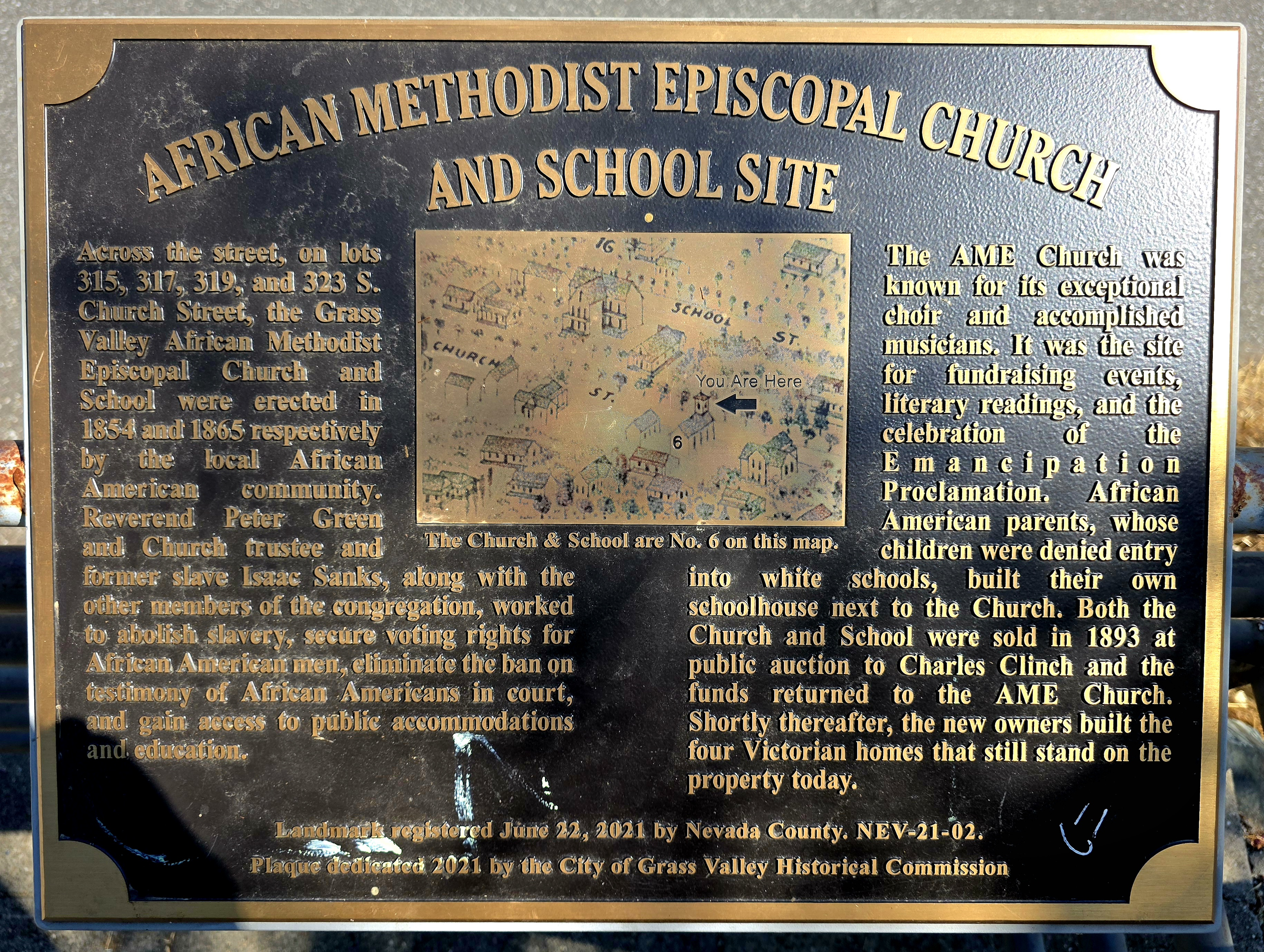
African Methodist Episcopal Church and School Site plaque, Grass Valley, California

English had broken up slave families, bringing some but not all of his slaves to California while leaving spouses or close relatives in Florida or South Carolina. An example was Chasy Sanks and her extended family. Her unusual name (sometimes spelled Chasey) has allowed her life story to be documented. She was first recorded in a special census conducted in Indian Key, Florida in 1838 as "Chasy English" as the slaves were listed with the surnames of their owners. When she traveled with English to New Orleans in 1842, she was listed as ten years old and five feet tall, which implies a year of birth of 1832. Various census records in California list her year of birth as about 1834 or about 1835 or about 1831. Census records of formerly enslaved people were not expected to be accurate, but they agree that she was born in South Carolina.. She was transported to California along with her brothers Joe and Jacob Thomas to work at the Kentucky Ridge mine by her owner English, but without her husband Isaac Sanks who remained enslaved by Charles L. Howe on Indian Key. After English died, Chasy Sanks got a job as a cook at a boarding house in Grass Valley, earning $100.00 per month. She was soon able to buy her husband's freedom for $600.00 and he arrived in California on January 27, 1853 Some accounts indicate that Isaac Sanks also earned some money as a boat pilot in Florida for the purpose of buying his wife's freedom. The Sanks and Thomas families and several other families of former slaves lived in Grass Valley for decades as productive citizens, and Grass Valley had about 165 Black residents in those years.

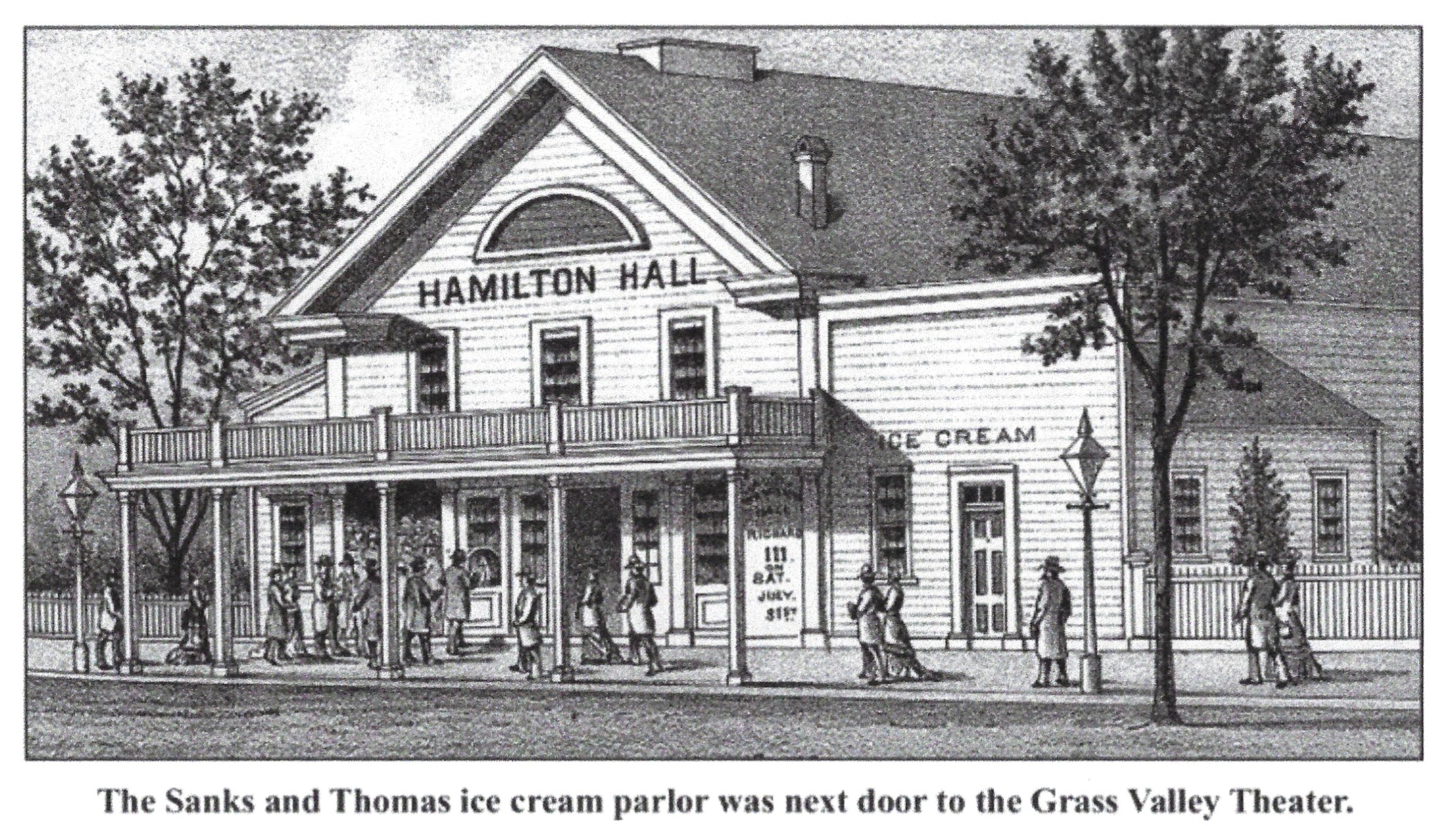
Sanks and Thomas Ice Cream Parlor

Isaac Sanks became a community leader and political activist who operated an ice cream parlor with his brother-in-law Joe Thomas for about 25 years, next to a local theater called Hamilton Hall. He was a trustee of the local AME Church, a custodian for Wells, Fargo and Company, and a reporter for the Pacific Appeal, an African-American newspaper published in San Francisco.
