= Luzena Wilson =

California businesswoman (c. 1820–1902)

Luzena Stanley Wilson, née Hunt (c. 1820–1902) was a California Gold Rush entrepreneur. Wilson came overland to California from Missouri with her husband and two small children in 1849. Luzena recounted her memoirs to her daughter Correnah, in which she describes her journey from the early days in Sacramento, her founding of the “El Dorado” hotel in Nevada City, and her purchase of land in Vaca.

== Early life ==
The family had moved to Andrew County, Missouri, by 1843, and in 1844 Luzena married Mason Wilson there.

== Overland journey ==
Gold fever spread in the American West during 1849. When Luzena's husband made up his mind to go west, she stated that where he went, so too could she and her two small children. At the time of the California Gold Rush, the West was unsettled territory that seemed unsafe for women. A wife usually stayed behind and managed the home while the man tried his luck at striking gold. Before beginning her journey, Luzena thought it would be a small task. However, as they began their travels into the West and encountered the vast deserts reality set in. Luzena wrote: “The road was lined with the skeletons of the poor beasts who had died in the struggle ... Sometimes we found the bones of men bleaching beside their broken-down and abandoned wagons. The buzzards and coyotes, driven away by our presence from the horrible feasting, hovered just out of reach.” The enormous lure of gold led to many people embarking on the same westward trails. Guidebooks purchased by miners (49ers) spoke of how the crucial timing was to a successful journey; therefore, it was not uncommon to have multiple groups of men traveling together. Abandonment of possessions by caravans traveling the perilous overland trek was common to lighten loads of the wagons through dangerous or muddied roads. Mason Wilson, Luzena's husband, told her it would be necessary to abandon her dirty, but prized calico apron, and three sides of bacon to spare the oxen on the ever-worsening roads. The apron would not have made a significant difference in the weight of the wagon but it symbolized the need to prioritize in order to survive the passage over the vast terrains. The Wilsons thought that unless they were able to rid some weight they would be dropped behind the others in the caravan and traveling alone could be dangerous. Luzena, while her husband was busy fixing the wagon, decided to clean the apron and render the fat out of the bacon to refill her lard can and leave the rest as he requested. In her memoirs, she remarks how they later laughed at the idea that those few items would have really made a big difference.

== Early California experience ==
Once in Sacramento, Luzena quickly learned the value of being a female minority in a male-dominated group. A hungry miner amazed at the presence of a female in the camp approached Luzena while she was cooking dinner for her family. He offered her five dollars for her biscuits. Luzena said she thought it sounded like a fortune and hesitated to respond. The miner mistook her hesitation as reluctance and upped the offer to ten dollars, which she gladly accepted.

== Sacramento ==
After a few days in Sacramento, the Wilsons sold their oxen to purchase a stake in a hotel. The hotel, Luzena remarked, consisted of two rooms, the kitchen, which was her special province, and a living room. During the six-month stay in Sacramento, Luzena saw only two other women. Therefore, she was able to gain a lot of business from the men who desired a meal cooked by a woman.

== Disaster and the move to Nevada City ==
Around Christmas time 1850, the levees broke in Sacramento and the floodwater damaged the Wilson's property and their small fortune of barley. Terrified of the long duration of winter with no money, and frightened of flooding disaster to strike again, Luzena learned of miners who were striking it rich in Nevada City. Broke and desperate to start anew, Luzena found a man with an idle team who said he would take her, her two children, a stove, and two sacks of flour to Nevada City for seven hundred dollars. Luzena stated if she survived the journey and made money he would be paid. Luzena's memoirs do not specify if her husband came with them or if he found other transportation beforehand or afterward. Upon arrival in Nevada City Luzena saw a sign for the Wamac Hotel and remarked, that her being a woman made her decide to take in boarders as a source of income. With her new determination to set up a rival hotel, she chopped her wood and drove her stakes into the ground. By the time her husband came back that evening she already had twenty men eating at her table in the El Dorado hotel. In six weeks Luzena had made the money to pay back the teamster.

== Disaster again ==
Luzena recalled, “We had lived eighteen months in Nevada City when fire cut us adrift again, as water had done in Sacramento.” Fire swept through and burned the “El Dorado” to the ground and the Wilsons decided to journey back towards Sacramento. However, having found it much changed, they lingered for a few months and decided to venture on to the valley. After four or five days of easy traveling, the Wilsons pitched their tent along the first outlying range of low foothills. Luzena wrote of their desire to settle in the valley. Lacking the funds to buy land, Mason set off to cut hay in order to make money, leaving Luzena on her own. She created a sign with scrap wood and charred embers saying “Wilson’s Hotel” and started over again. Wilson's Hotel was the only hotel on the road between Sacramento and Benicia for several years. This site eventually became the city of Vacaville, California. Luzena remained in Vacaville for 27 prosperous years. Her meager beginnings with the “Wilson’s Hotel” grew once again into a money-making business. Luzena invested their money in numerous properties in the area.

== Later life ==
In 1872, Mason suddenly left his family and headed for Texas. Luzena stayed on in Vacaville until 1877 when two fires destroyed her property. After the fires she once again moved to Sacramento. Income from her real estate transactions supplemented her income during the later part of her life. In 1881, Luzena's daughter, Correnah, entered puberty. To make the time pass, Luzena recounted the stories of her early days in California. Her final statement in her memoirs remarked how the difficulties of her earlier pioneer days are left far behind in this current age of plenty. Luzena Stanley Wilson's memoirs present an alternate view of the California Gold Rush in which women are often left out. She died on July 11, 1902, at the age of 83 of thyroid cancer at the Hotel Pleasanton in San Francisco.
