= Oakwood Memorial Park (Santa Cruz, California) =

Cemetery in California

- Interactive map of Oakwood Memorial Park

Details
- Established: 1908 (age 117–118)
- Location: Santa Cruz, California
- Country: United States
- Coordinates: 36.9919°N 121.9853°W
- Owned by: Independent Order of Odd Fellows
- Website: scmemorial.com
- Find a Grave: Oakwood Memorial Park

Oakwood Memorial Park, also known as the I.O.O.F. Cemetery, is a cemetery located at 3301 Paul Sweet Road in Santa Cruz, California, and was established in 1908. On site is the Oakwood Chapel.

== History ==
The Oakwood Memorial Park location of this cemetery used to be part of Rancho Encinalitos, a Spanish land grant, which was later partitioned into Rancho Arroyoita which held Sacramenta Castro's adobe home. In 1908, a group of Protestant ministers from 12 local churches purchased the land.

In 1956, the Odd Fellows Cemetery Association purchased the land. The Santa Cruz Memorial Park cemetery, founded in 1862, and located at 1927 Ocean Street is connected now by the same management, the Independent Order of Odd Fellows (IOOF).

== Notable internments ==
- William Vincent Lucas (1835–1921), Republican politician

== See also ==
- List of cemeteries in California
