= Santa Cruz Memorial Park =

Cemetery in Santa Cruz, California, US

Santa Cruz Memorial Park Odd Fellows Cemetery IOOF Cemetery
- Interactive map of Santa Cruz Memorial Park; Odd Fellows Cemetery; IOOF Cemetery

Details
- Established: 1862; 164 years ago
- Location: 1927 Ocean Street, Santa Cruz, California, U.S.
- Coordinates: 36.99050°N 122.02830°W
- Owned by: Independent Order of Odd Fellows
- Website: scmemorial.com
- Find a Grave: Santa Cruz Memorial Park; Odd Fellows Cemetery; IOOF Cemetery

Santa Cruz Memorial Park is a cemetery founded in 1862 and located at 1927 Ocean Street in Santa Cruz, California. It is also known as the Odd Fellows Cemetery, and the IOOF Cemetery. The site contains a historical marker erected by the Independent Order of Odd Fellows.

== History ==
The cemetery was founded in 1862 by Santa Cruz Lodge No.96 of the Independent Order of Odd Fellows (IOOF). The Oakwood Memorial Park in Santa Cruz, is also owned and managed by the IOOF.

Some local events have caused an increase of burials at Santa Cruz Memorial Park, including the 1876–1877 diphtheria epidemic in California, and the 1898 California Powder Works explosions.

== Notable internments ==
- Elihu Anthony (1818–1905) alcalde, blacksmith, industrialist, abolitionist, postmaster, and minister; considered the "founding father" of Santa Cruz
- Vera McKenna Clayton (1896–1978) music teacher
- John William Fenton (1828–1890) was a British musician and the leader of a British military band in Japan
- Howard Wayne "Red" Hickey (1917–2006) professional football player and coach
- Frederick A. Hihn (1829–1913) German-born American businessman, land developer, real estate investor, and politician
- Velma Huskey (1917–1991) pioneer in early computing, author, computing historian
- Georgiana Bruce Kirby (1818–1887) English-born American teacher and writer noted for her work in women's suffrage
- Benjamin Knight (1836–1905) politician, physician
- William T. Jeter (1850–1930) politician and lawyer
- Joseph Smallwood (1814–1880) African American pioneer of Santa Cruz County

== See also ==
- List of Odd Fellows buildings
- List of cemeteries in California
