= Frederick A. Hihn =

German-born American businessman, politician (1829–1913)

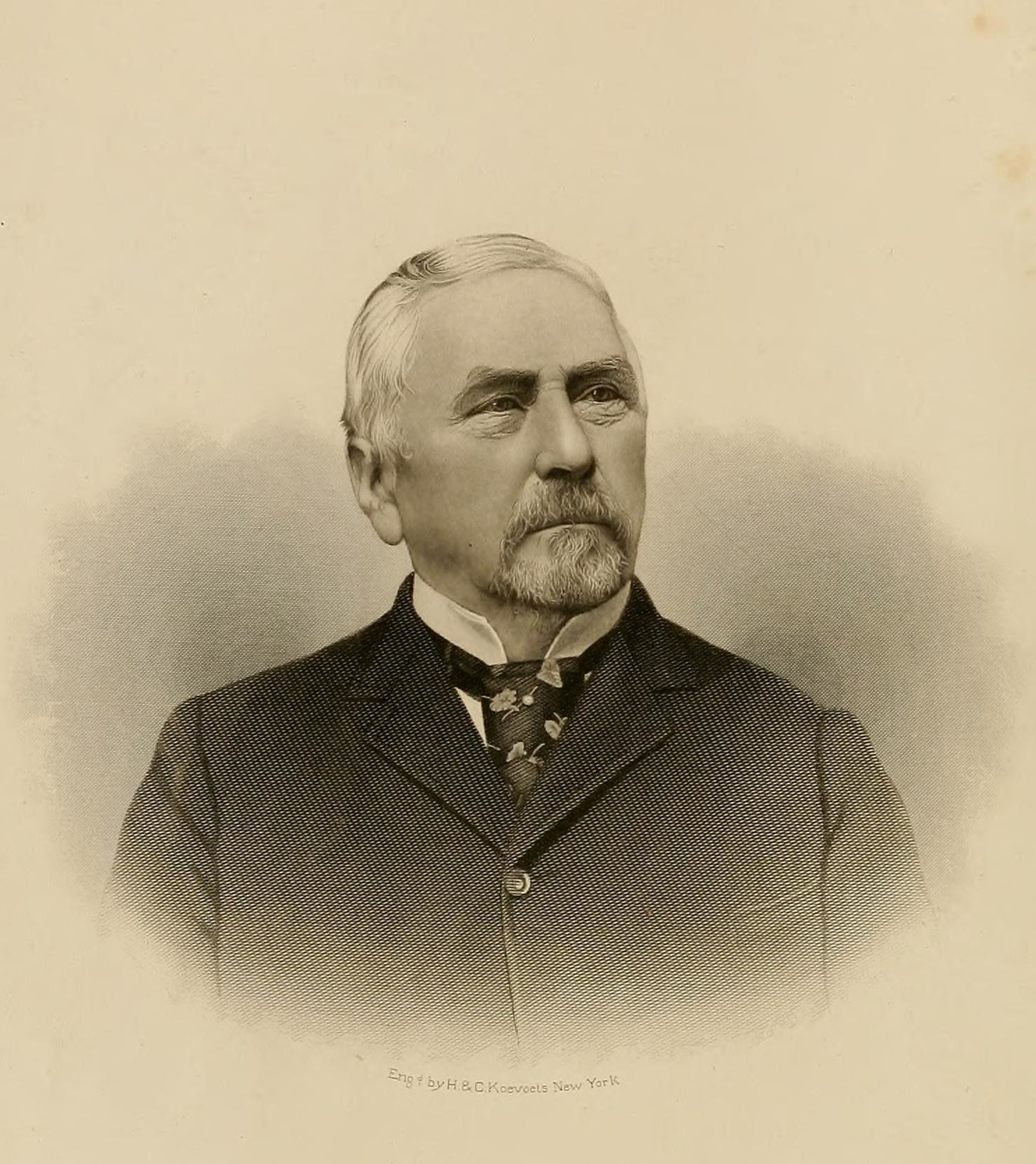

California State Assembly
- In office 1869–1870

Personal details
- Born: Friedrich August Ludewig Hühn; August 16, 1829 Altendorf, Duchy of Brunswick (now Germany)
- Died: August 23, 1913 (aged 84) Santa Cruz, California, U.S.
- Resting place: Santa Cruz Memorial Park
- Party: Independent
- Occupation: Businessperson, land developer, real estate investor, politician

Frederick Augustus Hihn (né Friedrich August Ludewig Hühn; August 16, 1829 – August 23, 1913) was a German-born American businessman, land developer, real estate investor and politician in Santa Cruz, California. He served one term in the California State Assembly. He commonly went by F. A. Hihn.

== History ==
Frederick Augustus Hihn was born as Friedrich August Ludewig Hühn on August 16, 1829, in Altendorf, Duchy of Brunswick (in modern-day Holzminden, Lower Saxony, Germany).

Hihn emigrated to California during the Gold Rush in 1849. After an unsuccessful stint as a miner, Hihn returned to San Francisco, where over the next several years he tried a handful of entrepreneurial activities, including selling candy, operating hotels, and owning both a drug store and a soap factory.

In 1851 he moved to Santa Cruz, where he would remain for the next sixty years. Hihn became the leading land developer in Santa Cruz County, California. In the 1860s, he acquired much of the former Rancho Soquel, including the beach resort area that became Capitola, California. With partner Claus Spreckels, Hihn built the Santa Cruz Railroad, first railroad into Santa Cruz County, completed in 1876.

Starting in 1865, Frederick A. Hihn and Elihu Anthony built the first private water supply network in the city of Santa Cruz and serving nearby communities.

In 1869, he ran for the California State Assembly as an Independent. He served only one term from 1869 until 1870, but continued to be involved in local and regional politics, often to the advantage of his own businesses. The Hihn Company was a family timber business and owned 15,000 acres of land in Santa Cruz County of which 2,000 acres was redwood forests.

When he died on August 23, 1913, Hihn owned a wide variety of businesses, from lumber yards to hotels. His personal business empire increased the infrastructure and economic development of Santa Cruz.
