= Peter Lester (abolitionist) =

American abolitionist (c. 1814 – c. 1897)

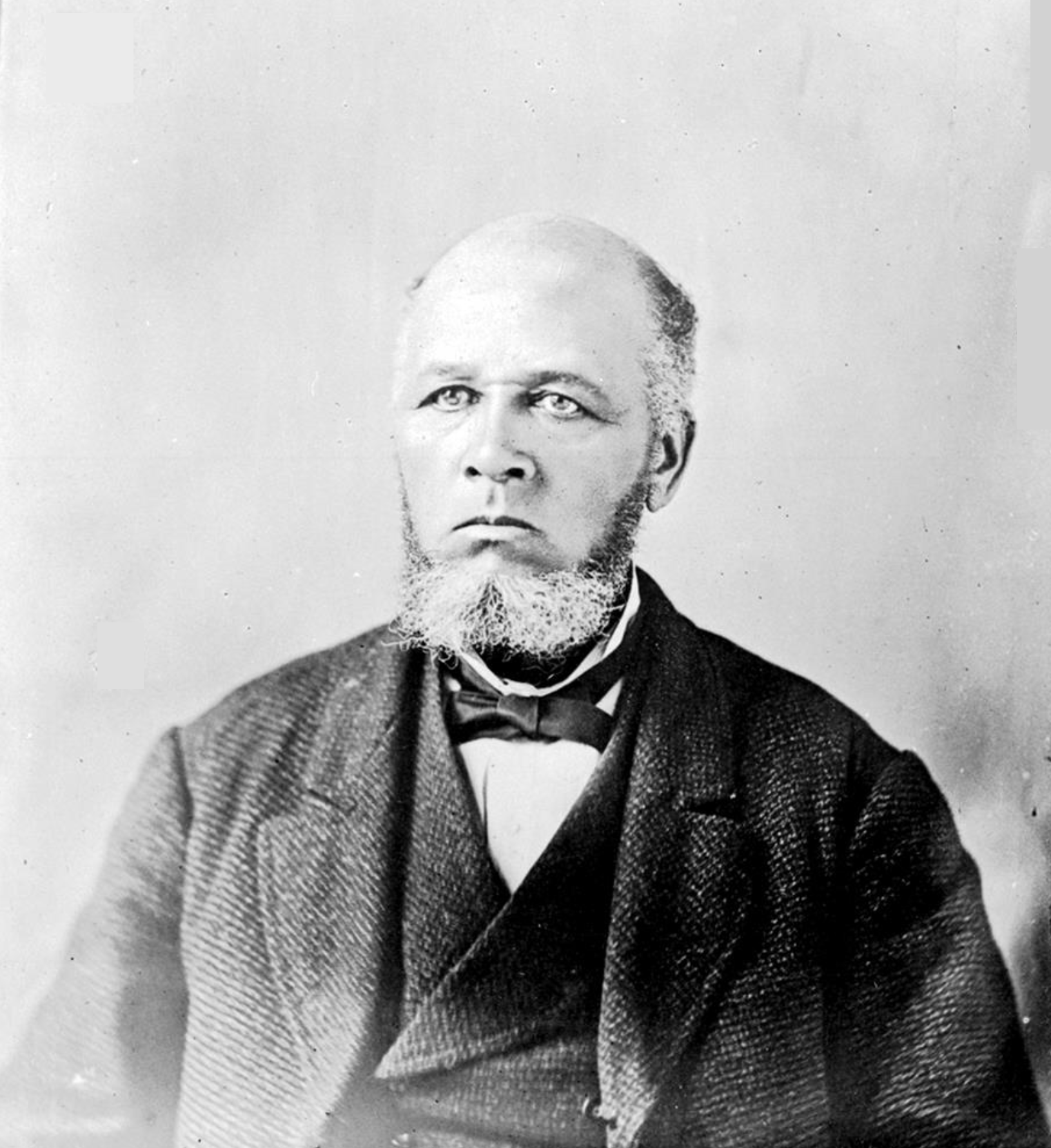
- Born: c. 1814; South Carolina, U.S.
- Died: c. 1897; San Francisco, California, U.S.
- Resting place: Ross Bay Cemetery, Victoria, British Columbia, Canada
- Occupations: Businessman, abolitionist
- Spouse: Nancy
- Children: 5

Peter Lester (c. 1814 – c. 1897) was an American-born 19th-century businessman and abolitionist. He was an early Black settler in San Francisco. In February 1860, he was the first Black person to sit as a juror in British Columbia.

== Early life ==
Peter Lester was born c. 1814 in South Carolina, U.S. Although some sources state he was born in Virginia, U.S.. His childhood was spent in Philadelphia. He had been a leader in the abolitionist movement in Philadelphia.

== San Francisco, California ==
In 1850, he moved from Philadelphia to San Francisco, to work as a shoeshiner and bootmaker during the Gold Rush-era. The following year in 1851, Lester, in partnership with Mifflin Wistar Gibbs, opened the Emporium for Boot and Shoes store at 638 Clay Street in San Francisco, selling imported shoes and boots. In Gibbs's autobiography, "Shadow and Light" (1902), he mentions that, while living in San Francisco, he and Lester were successful in business but dealt with community ostracization and physical assaults. Two white men assaulted him in his store and stole a pair of shoes, Lester was not able to press charges. As African Americans in California during this time, they were disenfranchised and thus unable to sit on a jury, unable to testify in court, and denied the right to vote.

In the late 1850s, Lester, along with his partner Gibbs and George W. Dennis, worked to secure the services of a White legal team to fight for the freedom of Archy Lee in a widely publicized fugitive slave case in California.

In 1858, Lester's teenaged daughter Sarah was attending an otherwise all-white school; a local newspaper, the San Francisco Herald printed an anonymous letter demanding her removal. She was removed for the school by her father after a few weeks of debate.

== Canada and late life ==
The Lesters participated in the 1858 mass exodus of African Americans to the city of Victoria on Vancouver Island in British Columbia, Canada during the Fraser River Gold Rush. In February 1860, he was the first Black person to sit as a juror in British Columbia. After the death of his wife in 1892, Lester sold his Victoria properties and returned to the United States. During his return, he was in his 80s and used a wheelchair.

He died sometime around c. 1897 in San Francisco. The Ross Bay Cemetery in Victoria erected an honorary gravestone for Lester in 2002.

== See also ==
- California State Convention of Colored Citizens
