= Cypress Lawn Memorial Park =

Cemetery in Colma, California

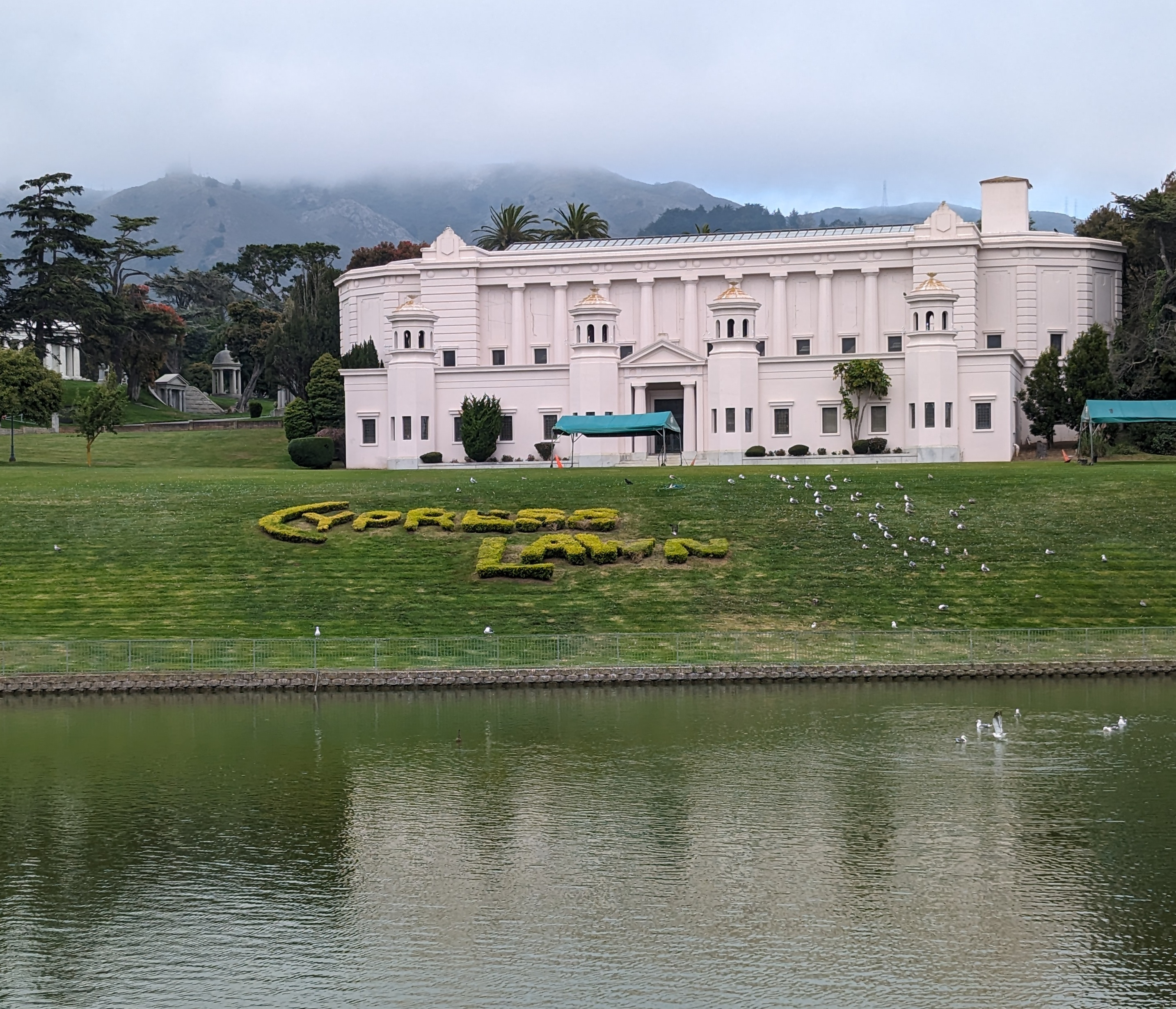
- Lakeside Columbarium and pond with topiary sign; San Bruno Mountain can be seen in the background
- Interactive map of Cypress Lawn Memorial Park

Details
- Established: 1892; 134 years ago
- Location: 1370 El Camino Real; Colma, California
- Country: United States
- Coordinates: 37.670°N 122.457°W
- Type: Nonprofit
- Owned by: Cypress Lawn Cemetery Association
- No. of interments: 200,000+
- Website: www.cypresslawn.com
- Find a Grave: Cypress Lawn Memorial Park
- The Political Graveyard: Cypress Lawn Memorial Park

Cypress Lawn Memorial Park, established by Hamden Holmes Noble in 1892, is a rural cemetery located in Colma, California, a place known as the "City of the Silent".

== History ==
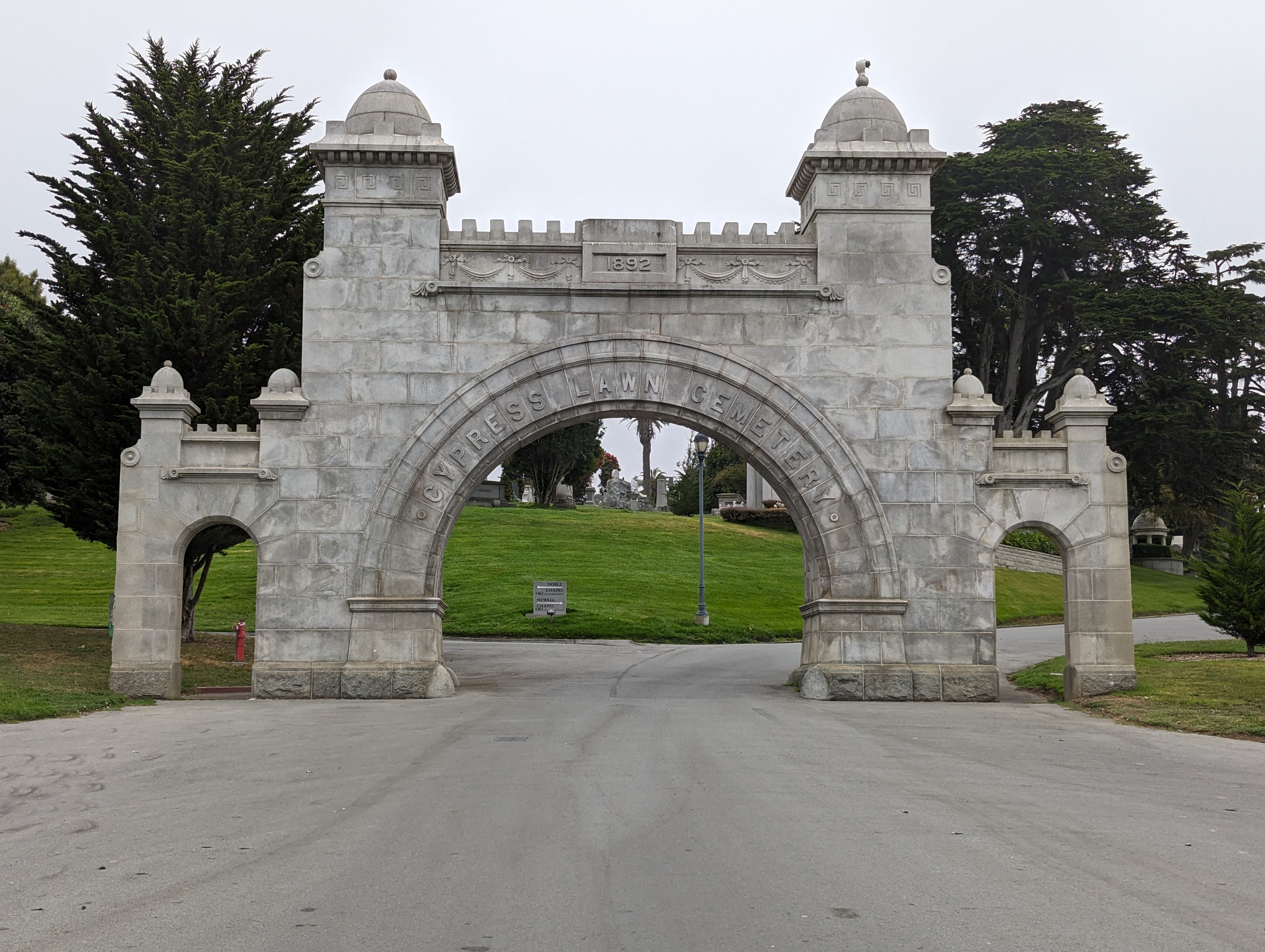
1892 entrance gate from El Camino Real to East Campus

Noble was a Civil War veteran who moved to California in 1865 and was a member of the San Francisco Stock Exchange prior to founding Cypress Lawn. On March 9, 1892, Noble was granted a permit to establish a non-sectarian cemetery and plans for Cypress Lawn were made public as work had begun on a mortuary chapel and receiving vault. Noble was responsible for the initial layout and landscape architecture of the cemetery.

The prominent castle-like granite entry gate east of El Camino was designed by the B. McDougall architecture firm in San Francisco in 1892, incorporating Mission Revival elements, and completed in 1893. The site was dedicated on May 28, 1893. A crematory also was completed in 1893, housed in a building designed by Albert Pissis and William P. Moore; it was damaged beyond repair during the 1957 San Francisco earthquake and subsequently demolished.

The idea of rural or garden cemeteries (as opposed to city cemeteries) became popular in the mid-19th century in the United States following the founding of Mount Auburn Cemetery, and cities like San Francisco began relocating their badly maintained urban cemeteries to suburban settings. Between February 1940 until 1945, many of the remains from the Lone Mountain Cemetery complex in San Francisco had been moved to Cypress Lawn Memorial Park and were placed in a mound. In 1993, a memorial obelisk was added to the grassy mound to commemorate those that had been re-interred.

The cemetery was among those profiled in the PBS documentary A Cemetery Special (2005) by Rick Sebak.

== Site ==
The original cemetery occupies 47 acres (19 ha) east of El Camino Real and west of Hillside Boulevard and is known as the East Campus; the site was expanded by 101 acres (41 ha) west of El Camino, acquired in 1901, named the West Campus. Lakes were added in the 1920s. In 2006, Cypress Lawn opened the 45-acre (18 ha) Hillside Gardens, northeast of the original campus. The Mount Olivet cemetery, founded in 1896 on 65 acres (26 ha) adjacent to Hillside Gardens, was acquired by Cypress Lawn in 2020 and renamed Olivet Gardens.

Several structures are on the original (East Campus) site, including the 1892 entrance gate, the Noble Chapel and Crematory, named for the founder and completed in 1894, and the original columbarium, completed in 1895 to a design by Edward Hatherton and T. Paterson Ross. The Lakeside Columbarium, also on the East Campus, was designed by Bernard J. S. Cahill and started in 1927, but construction was suspended in 1930 due to the Great Depression and never resumed. On the West Campus, both the Public Mausoleum and Catacombs (completed 1921) and the Administration Building (1919) were also designed by Cahill.

Since 2020, an annual Arboretum day is held in November to celebrate the site's trees, some of which were selected and planted by Noble. One of the notable trees on the original campus is a Monterey cypress which was estimated to be planted before 1906.

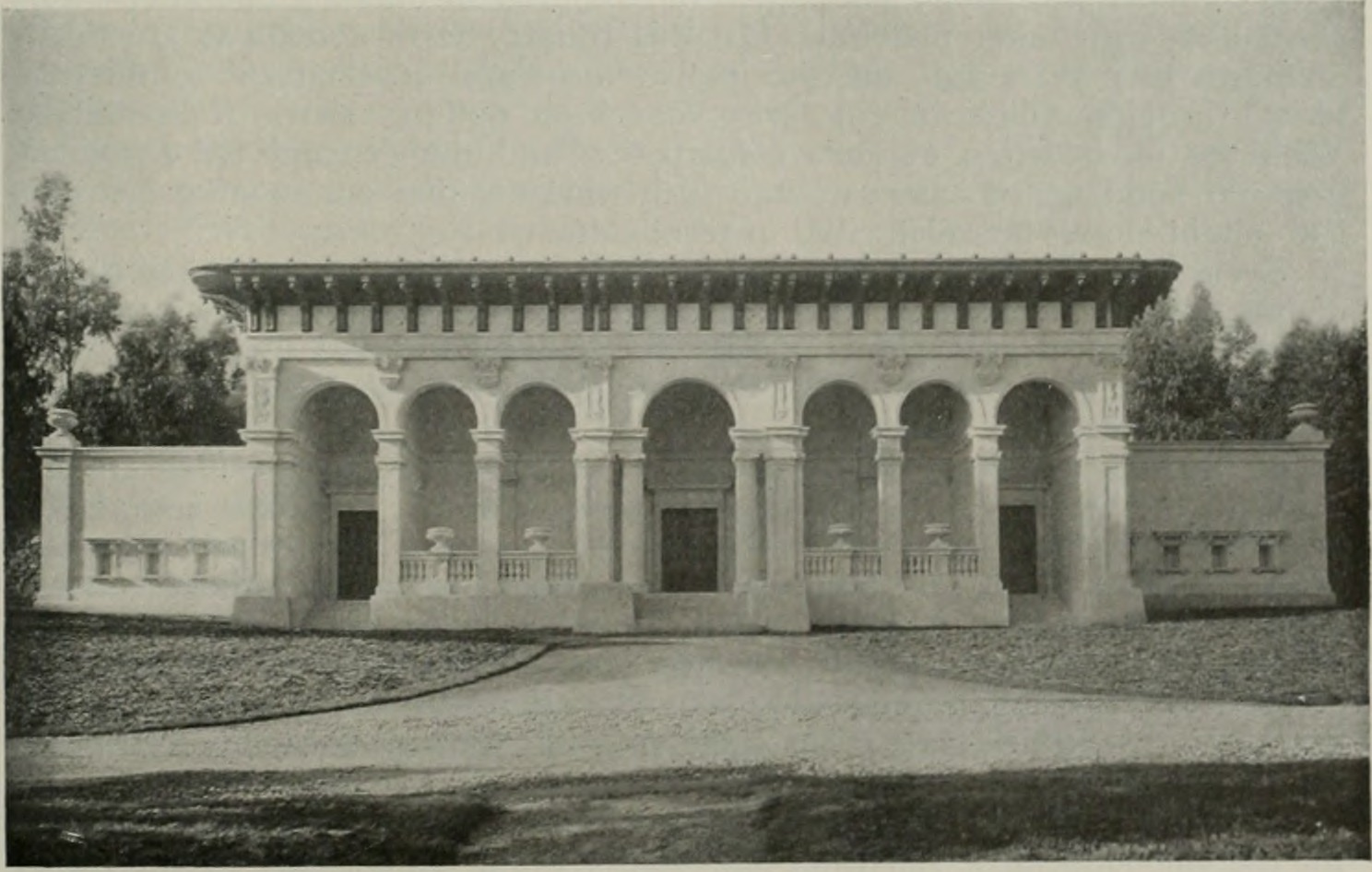
Public Mausoleum (West Campus, 1916)

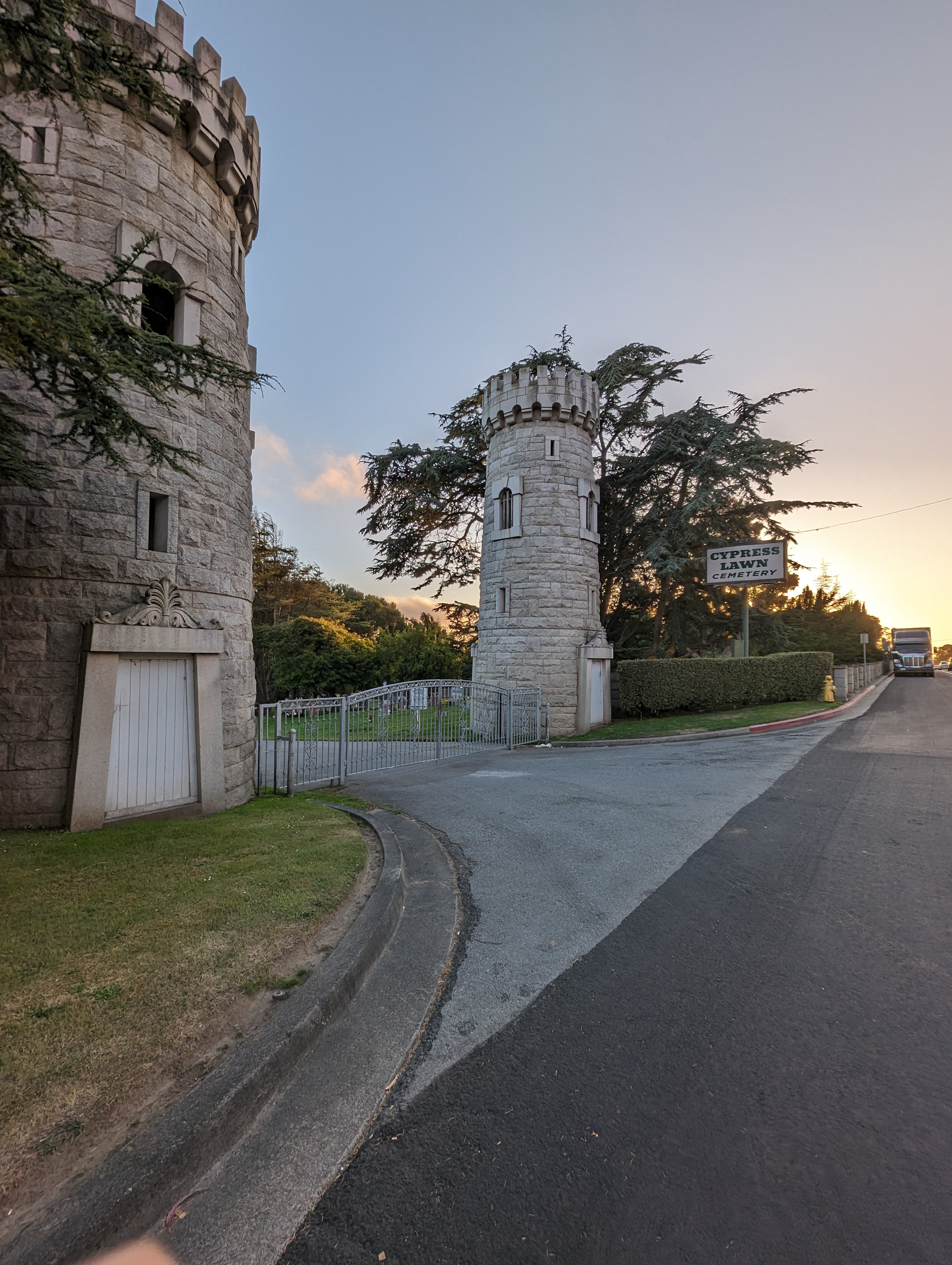
Eastern entrance to East Campus, from Hillside Blvd

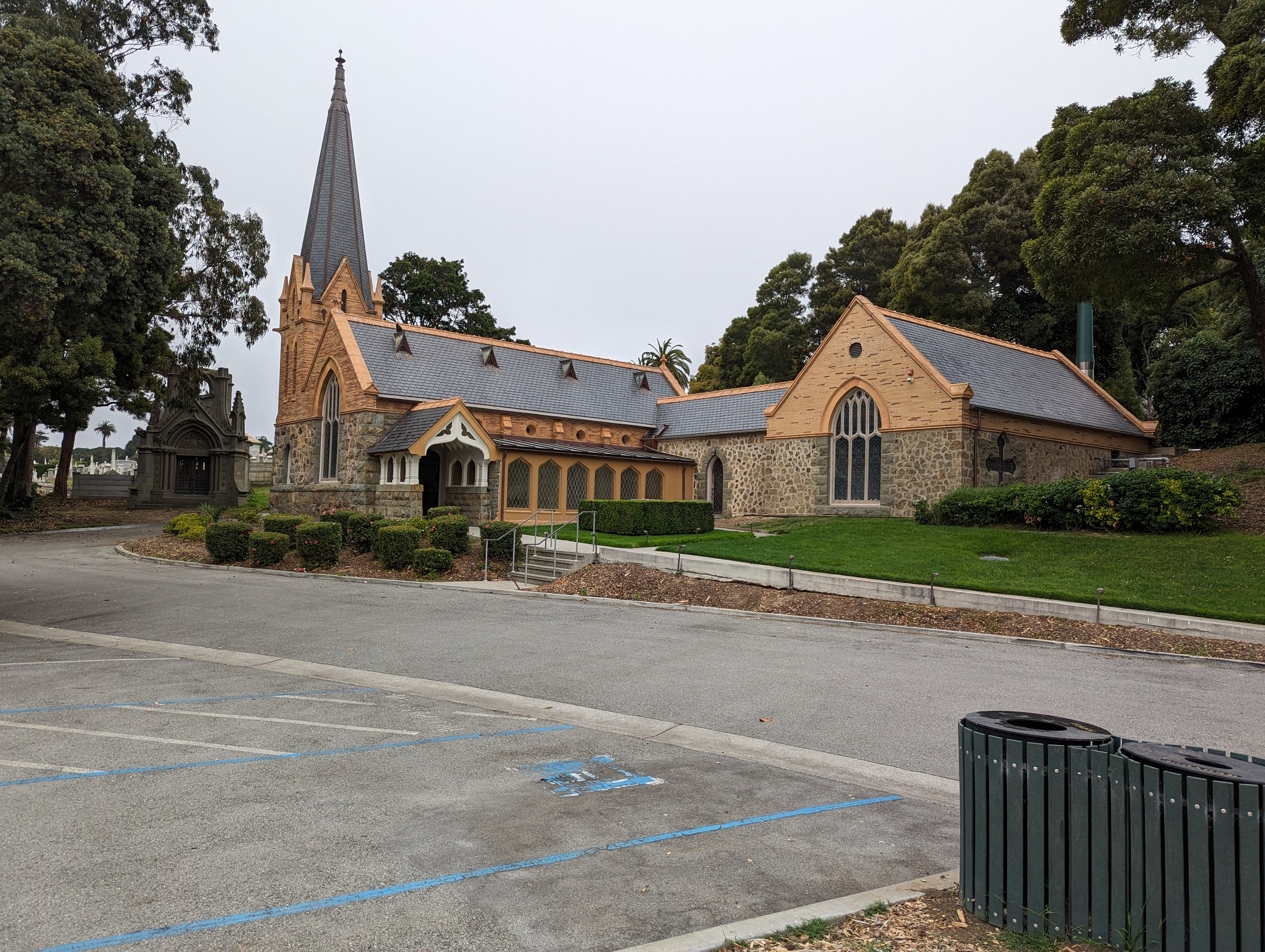
Noble Chapel (East Campus, 1894)

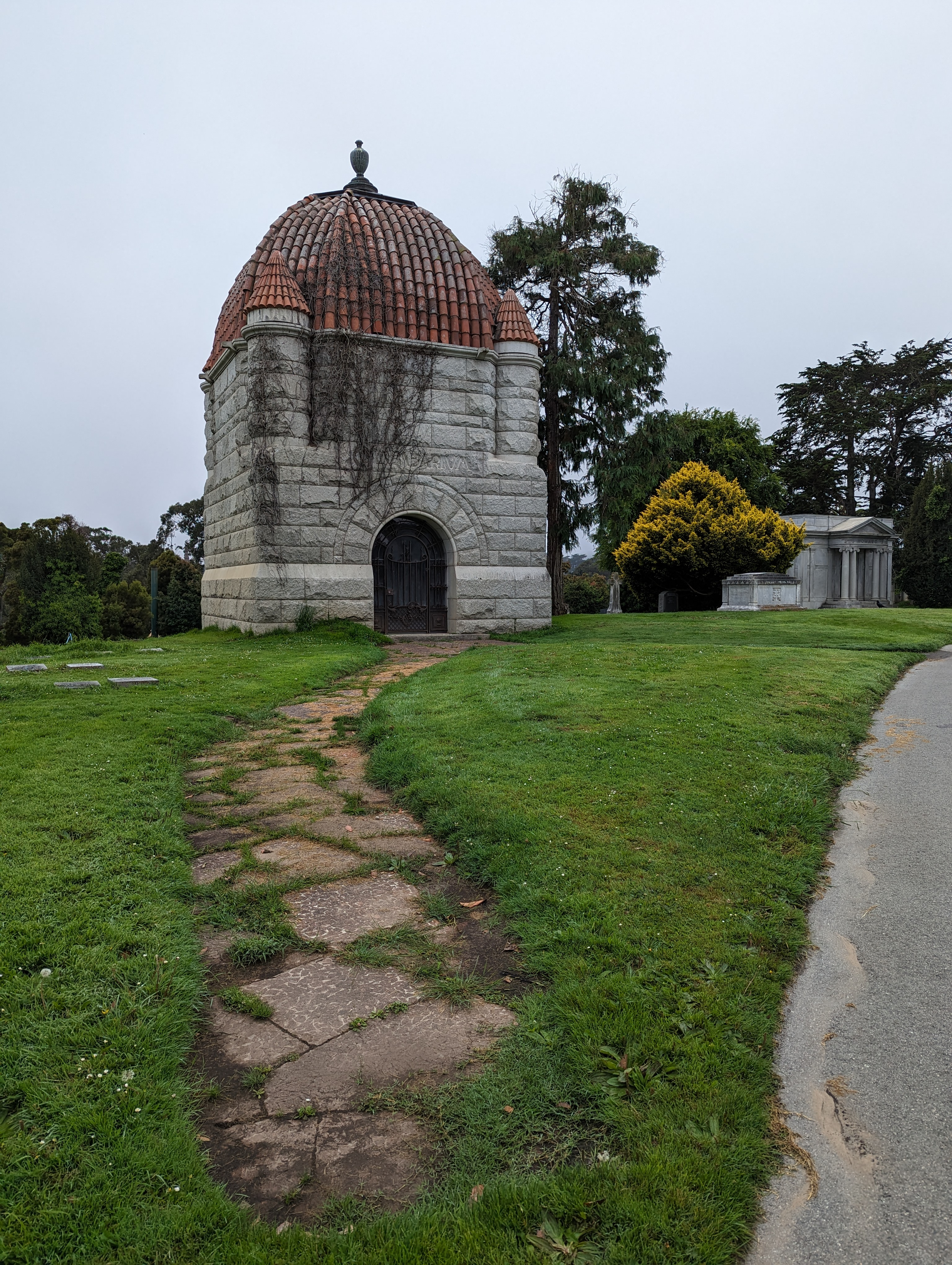
Original columbarium (East Campus, 1895)

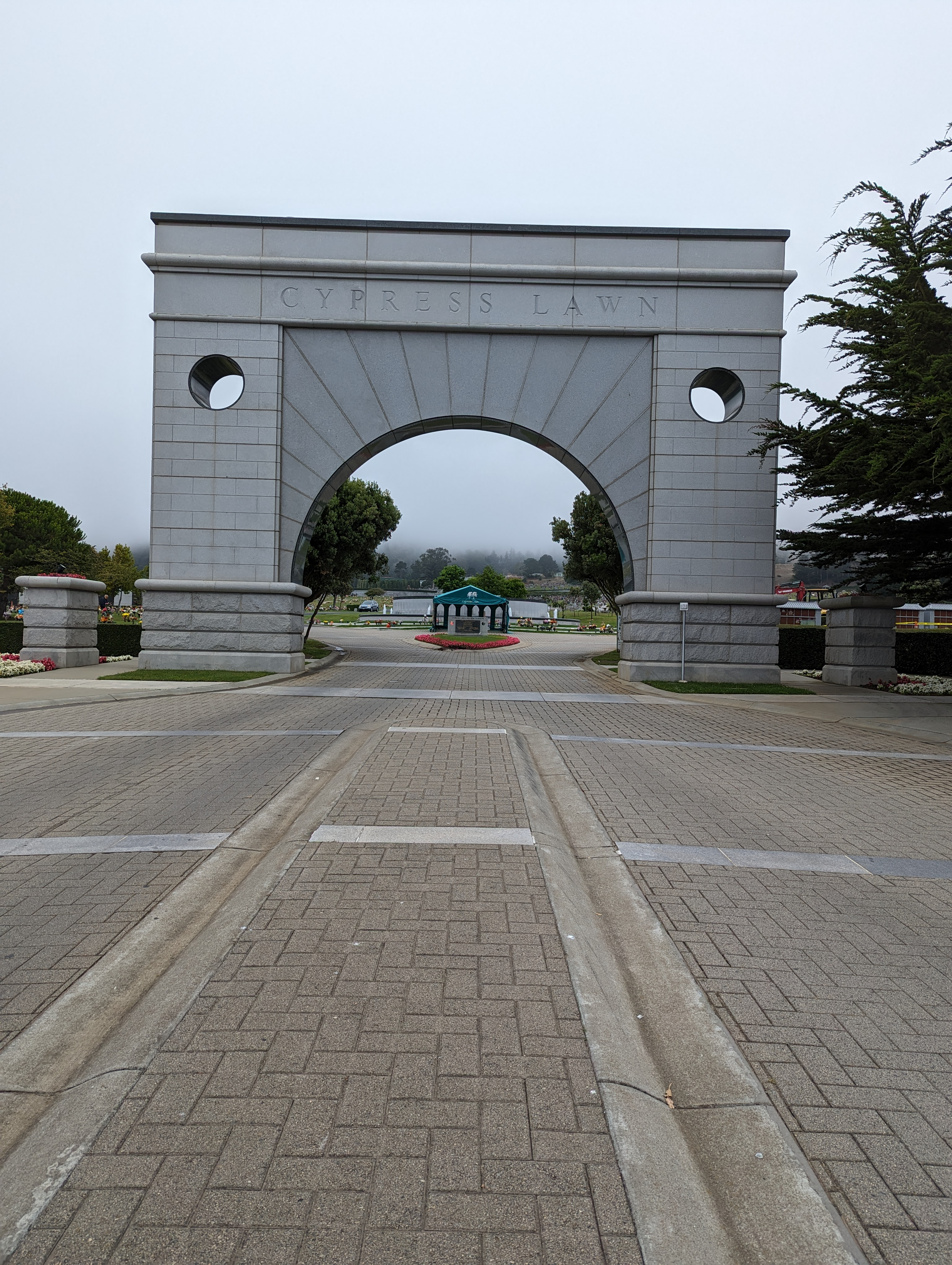
Entrance gate to Hillside Gardens

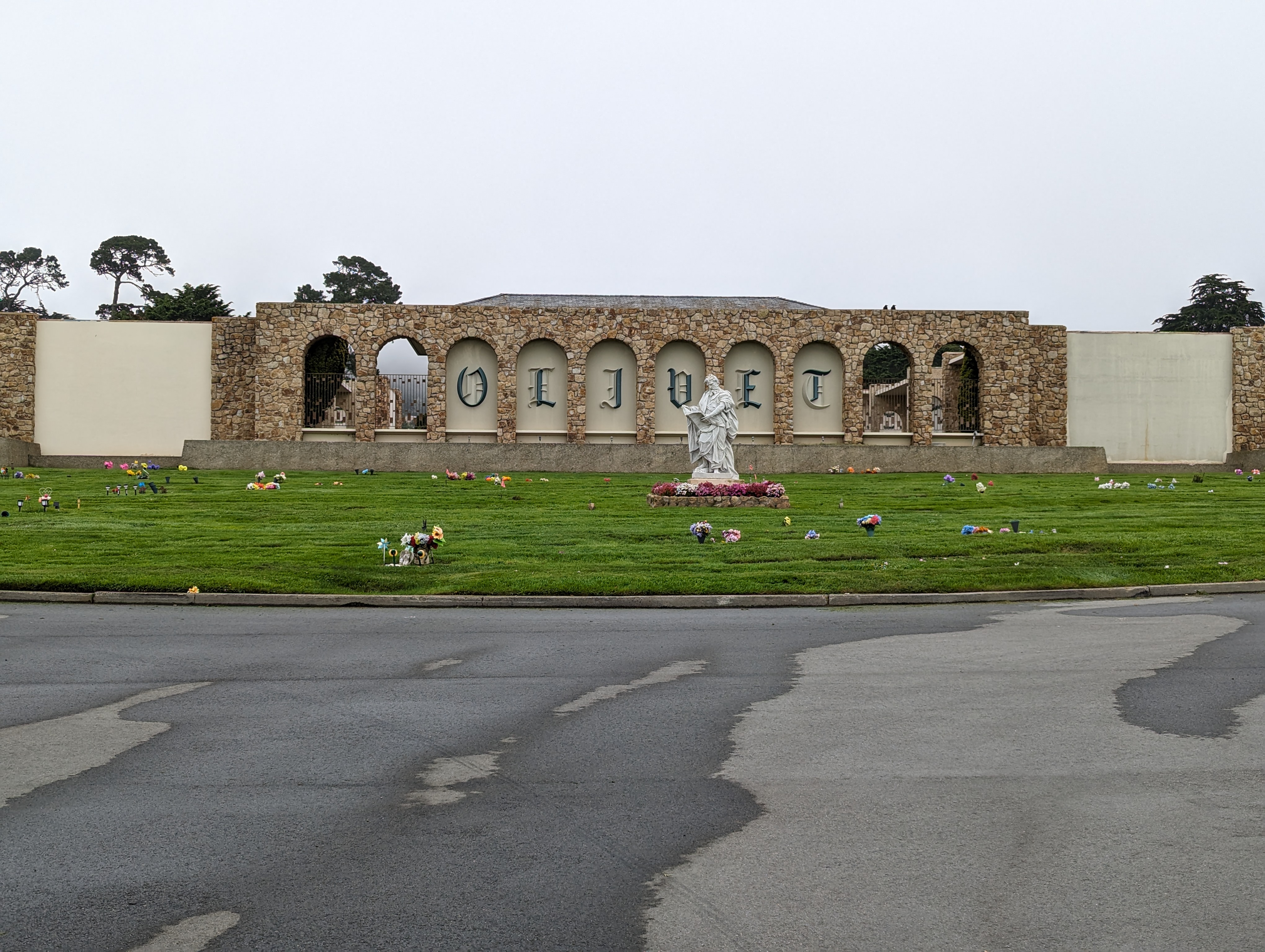
Olivet Gardens garden court

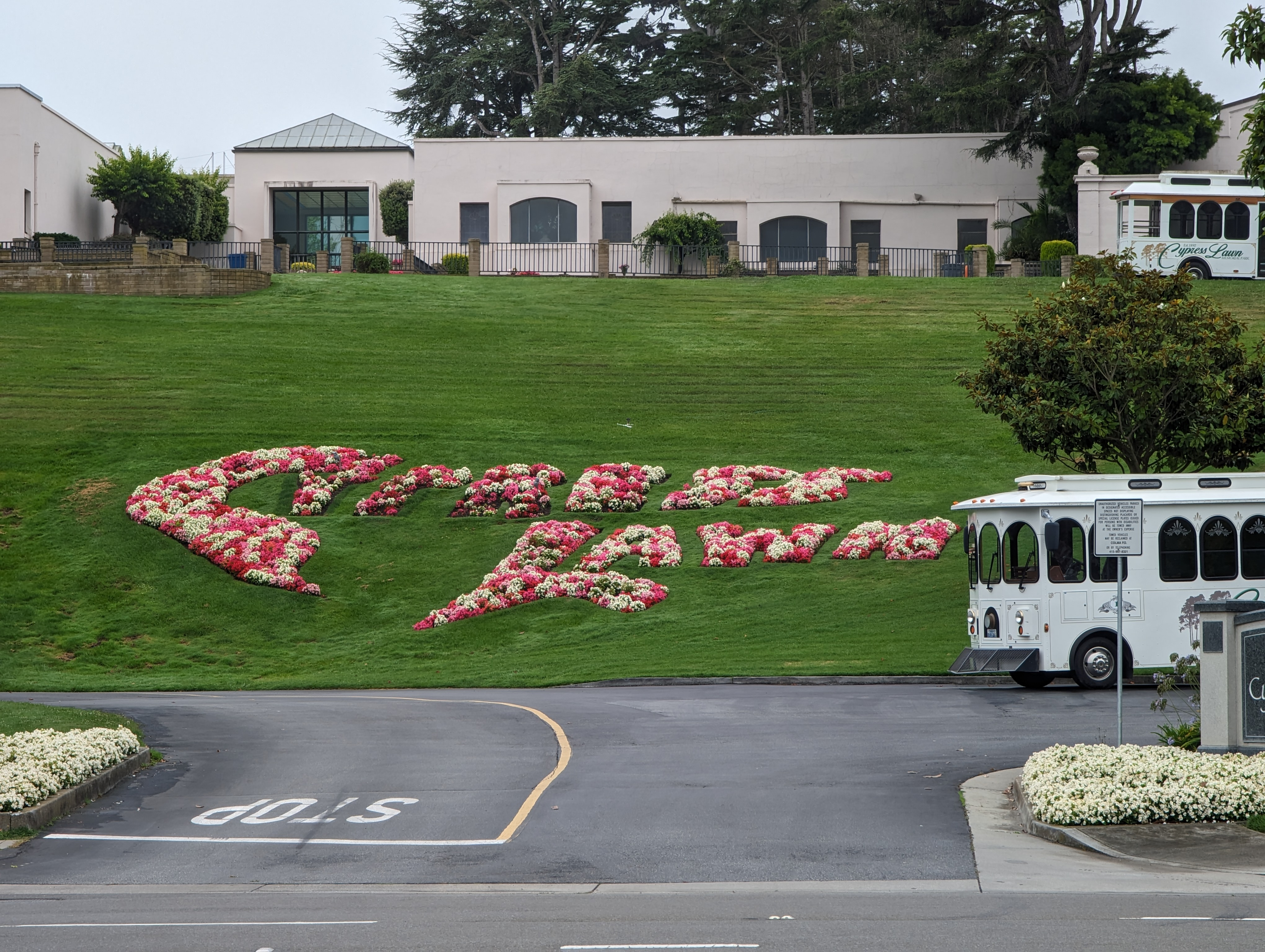
Floral topiary sign and tourist trolleys (West Campus)

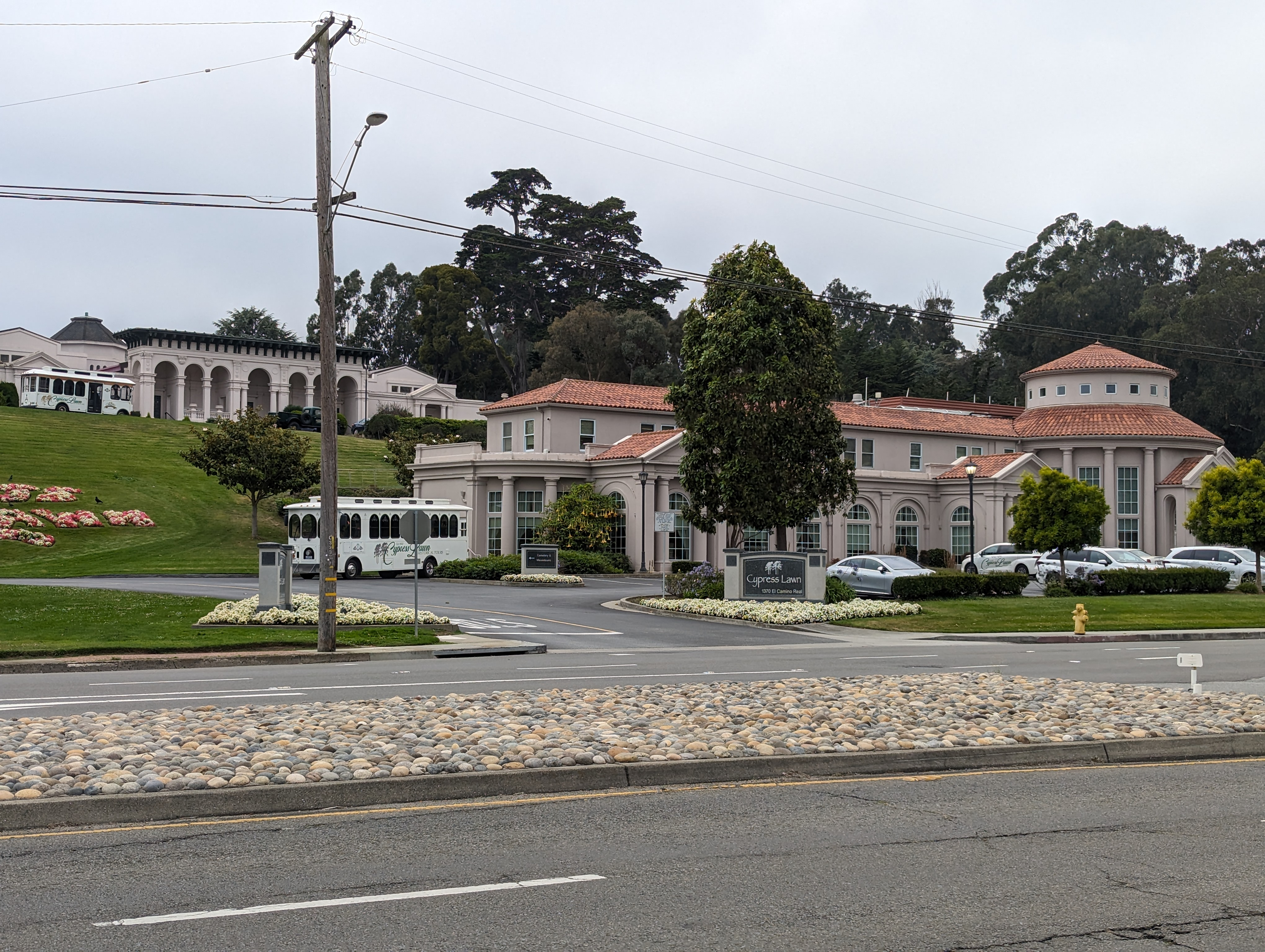
Catacombs and Administration buildings (West Campus)

== Notable burials ==
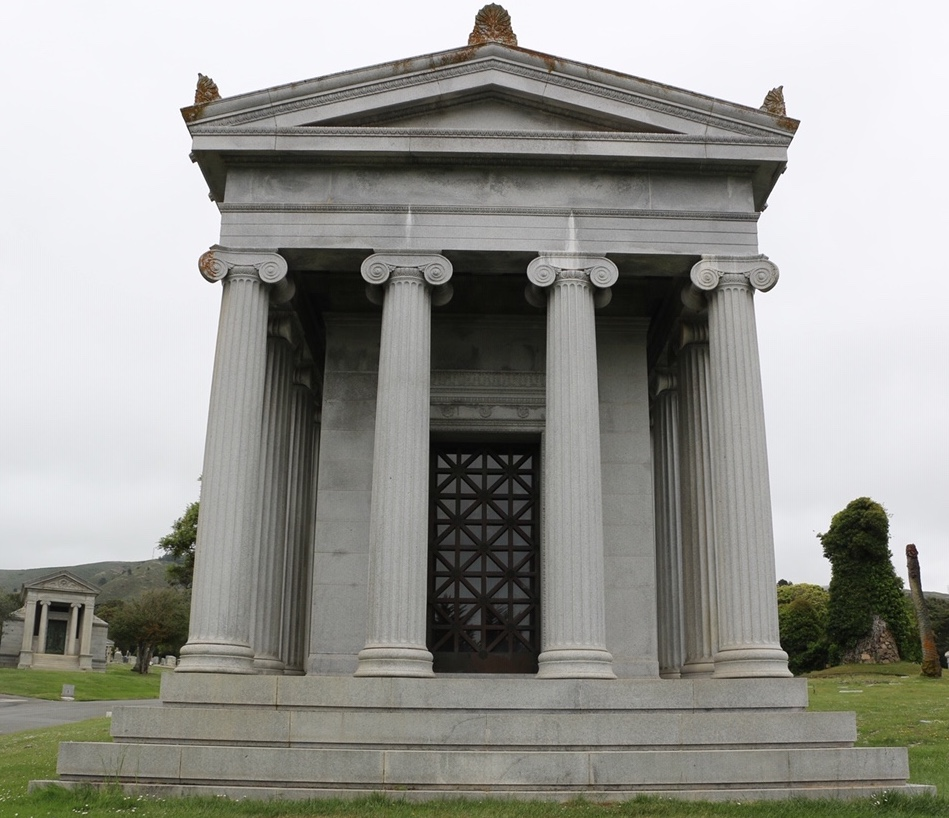
Hearst family mausoleum

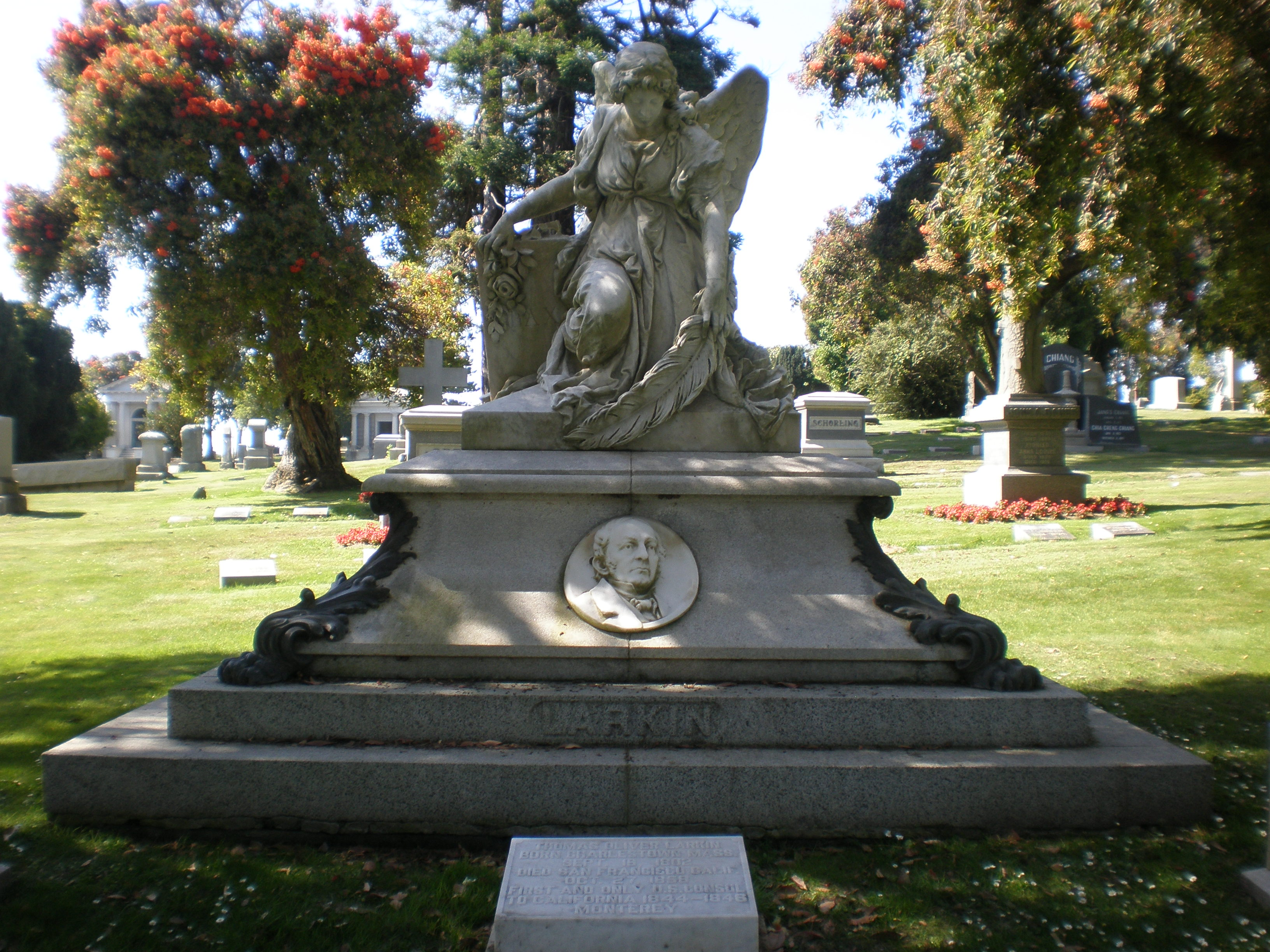
Thomas O. Larkin

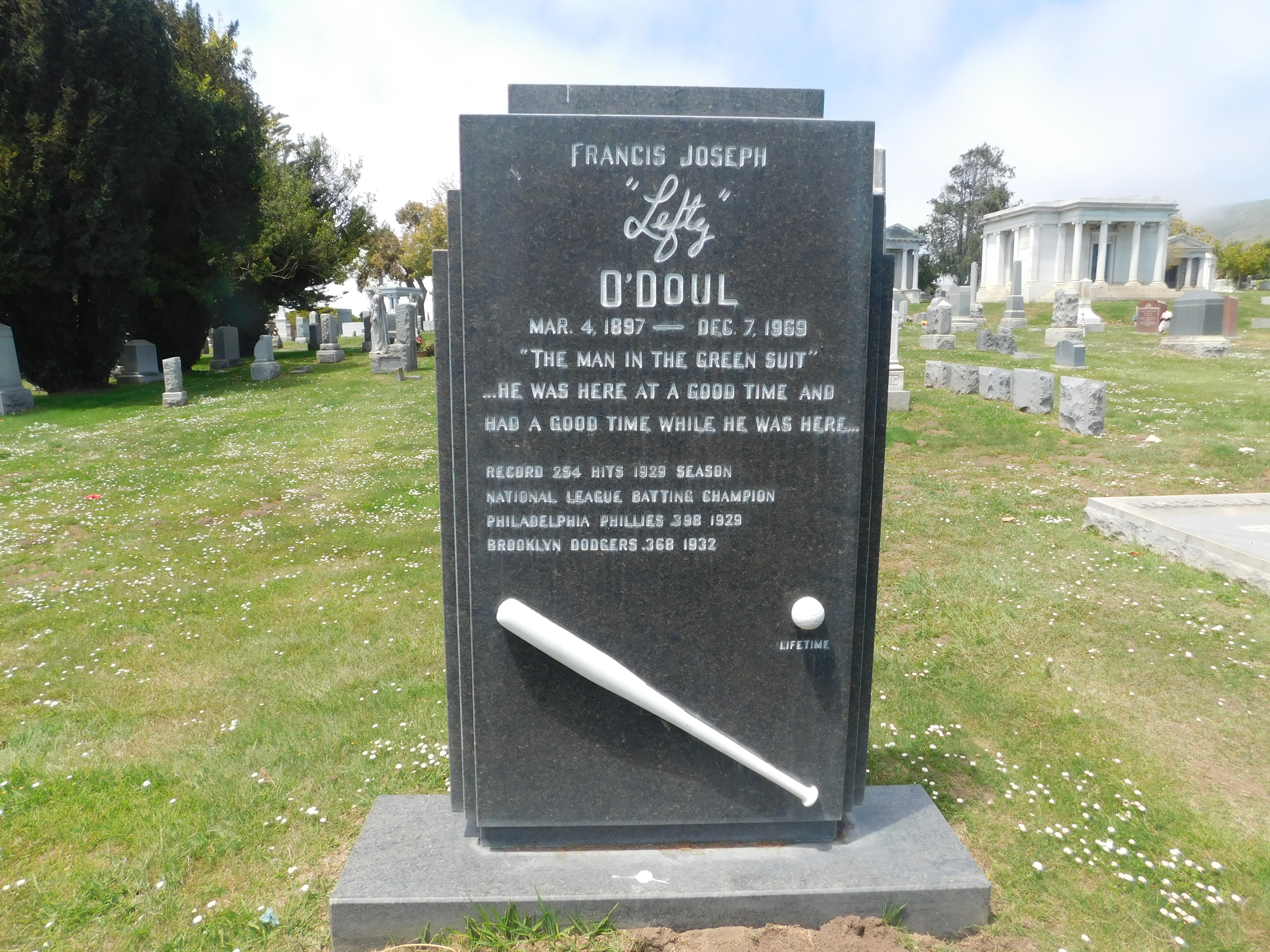
Lefty O'Doul

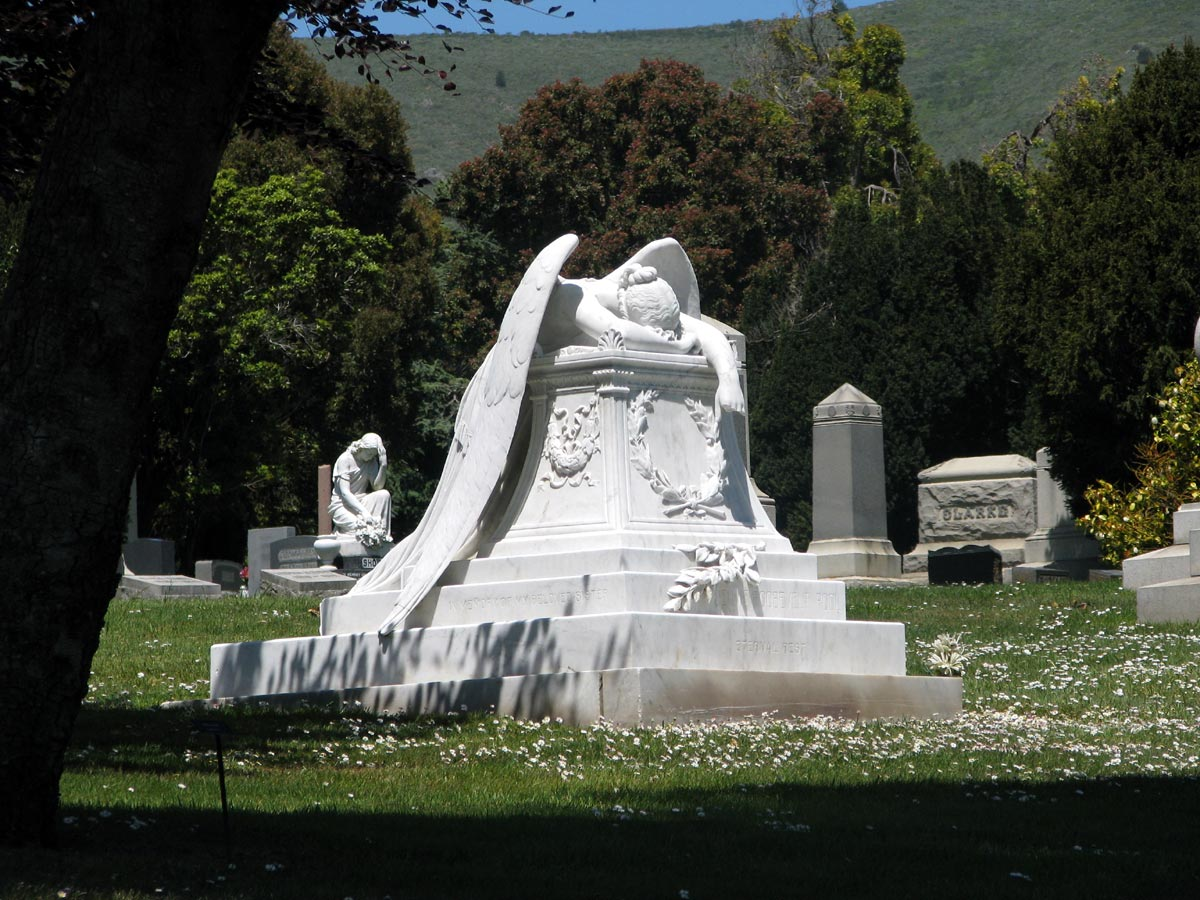
Jennie Roosevelt Pool memorial marked with the Angel of Grief

Cypress Lawn Memorial Park is the final resting site for several members of the celebrated Hearst family, people from the California Gold Rush, plus other prominent citizens from the city of San Francisco and nearby surroundings. By 1992, more than 300,000 had been interred at the site.

Three British Commonwealth service personnel of World War I were buried here, but only one, Lieutenant Norman Travers Simpkin (died 1919), Royal Field Artillery, has a marked grave in the cemetery. Two others, Canadian Army soldiers, are alternatively commemorated on a special memorial in Greenlawn Memorial Park in Colma.

=== A ===
- Isabella Macdonald Alden (1841–1930), writer
- Izora Armstead (1942–2004), singer and member of The Weather Girls
- Gertrude Franklin (Horn) Atherton (1857–1948), author
- Monte Attell (1885–1960), world boxing champion

=== B ===
- Hubert Howe Bancroft (1832–1918), pre-eminent writer of California history
- Lucius Barker (1928–2020), political scientist
- Lincoln Beachey (1887–1915), aviation pioneer
- David Colbreth Broderick (1820–1859), U.S. Senator from California; opponent of slavery, considered martyred in a duel by a pro-slavery opponent
- Arthur Brown (1874–1957), prominent San Francisco architect
- Samuel D. Burris (1813–1863), Underground Railroad conductor

=== C ===
- Dolph Camilli (1907–1997), 1941 National League Baseball Most Valuable Player
- R. C. Chambers (1832–1901), businessperson, politician, owner of the Chambers Mansion in San Francisco
- Silas Christofferson (1890–1916), aviation pioneer
- John C. Cremony (1815–1879), soldier, author, newsman
- Joseph Paul Cretzer (1911–1946), bank robber and prisoner, died in the escape attempt known as the "Battle of Alcatraz"
- Laura Hope Crews (1879–1942), actress
- William H. Crocker (1861–1937), banker

=== D ===
- George Washington Dennis (c. 1825–1916), formerly enslaved entrepreneur, real estate developer, and advocate for Black rights
- Anne McKee Armstrong de Saint Cyr (1864–1925), philanthropist, mother of Princess Miguel of Braganza, Duchess of Viseu
- Jean de Saint Cyr (1875–1966), playboy third husband of Anne McKee Armstrong de Saint Cyr

=== F ===
- Abby Fisher (c. 1832–1915), former slave and cookbook author
- Eddie Fisher (1928–2010), entertainer
- James Clair Flood (1826–1889), "Bonanza King"

=== G ===
- Phineas Gage (1823–1860), noted brain-injury survivor
- Jack Bee Garland (1869–1936), author, transgender man

=== H ===
- Andrew Smith Hallidie (1836–1900), first cable car system designer, Inventor
- William H. H. Hart (died 1918), 16th Attorney General of California
- George Hearst (1820–1891), businessman, father of William Randolph Hearst
- Phoebe Hearst (1842–1919), first female Regent of the University of California
- William Randolph Hearst (1863–1951), publishing magnate
- Charles S. Howard (1877–1950), businessman, owner of racehorse Seabiscuit

=== J ===
- Hiram W. Johnson (1866–1945), statesman, governor

=== K ===
- Jennie Murray Kemp (1858–1928), temperance leader and writer

=== L ===
- Thomas O. Larkin (1802–1858), businessman, signer of the original California Constitution
- Edwin M. Lee (1952–2017), 43rd Mayor of San Francisco
- William Lobb (1809–1864), English botanist and plant collector
- Edna Loftus (1891–1916), British actress
- Frederick Low (1828–1894), Congressman, California Governor, statesman

=== M ===
- Willie McCovey (1938–2018), Major League Baseball Hall of Famer
- Euthanasia Sherman Meade (1836–1895), first president of The Woman's Medical Club of California
- Addison Mizner (1872–1933), architect
- Tom Mooney (1882–1942), Wobblie, political prisoner
- William W. Morrow (1843–1929), U.S. Congressman, American Red Cross incorporator
- James Murdock (1931–1981), American film and television actor

=== N ===
- James Van Ness (1808–1872), 7th Mayor of San Francisco

=== O ===
- Lefty O'Doul (1897–1969), Major League Baseball player
- Betty Ong (1956–2001), 9/11 victim

=== P ===
- Orrin Peck (1860–1921), painter
- Joel Samuel Polack (1807–1882), trader, land speculator, writer and artist in pre-colonial New Zealand
- Grace Gimmini Potts (1886–1956), author and director of pageants

=== R ===
- Alvino Rey (1908–1980), jazz guitarist and bandleader

=== S ===
- Barbara Shermund (1899–1978), cartoonist
- Calvin E. Simmons (1950–1982), musical prodigy, conductor, musician
- Jack Spicer (1925–1965), poet
- Adolph B. Spreckels (1857-1924), industrialist
- Alma de Bretteville Spreckels (1881-1968), philanthropist
- Claus Spreckels (1828-1908), industrialist
- Lincoln Steffens (1866–1936), McClure's magazine writer, muckraking journalist
- Charlie Sweeney (1863–1902), Major League Baseball player

=== T ===
- David S. Terry (1823–1889), American judge of the California Supreme Court and politician

=== V ===
- Walter Varney (1888–1967), Founder of predecessors of United and Continental Airlines

== See also ==
- List of cemeteries in California
