= Bob Pritikin =

American author, advertising executive, art collector, and bon vivant (1929–2022)

- Born: Robert Charles Pritikin; May 6, 1929; Chicago, Illinois, U.S.
- Died: February 13, 2022 (aged 92); San Rafael, California, U.S.
- Occupations: Advertising executive, creative director, author, art collector
- Spouse(s): Louise (née Brown, divorced)
- Children: 2

Robert C. Pritikin (May 6, 1929 – February 13, 2022) was an American advertising executive, creative director, author, art collector, and bon vivant active on the San Francisco social scene.

== Early life and career ==
Pritikin was born on May 6, 1929, in Chicago, Illinois, to parents Esther Theodosia (née Burr Sherrard), and jazz musician, Arnold "Arnie" Pritikin of Russian Jewish heritage. As he says, he was, "raised in Chicago and lowered in Los Angeles".

As an ad agency copywriter in New York, where he became an executive at Young & Rubicam, then formed his own ad agency, Pritikin & Gibbons. In 1958, he was hired to work on the Maverick television series, and he moved to San Francisco.

In the early 1960s, Pritikin was the Creative Director of Fletcher, Richards, Calkins & Holden (FRC&H) advertising agency in San Francisco, responsible among other things for landmark Folgers Coffee television commercials for which he was the voice in the ads for many years. In 1964, FRC&H was bought by Campbell-Ewald Advertising, the Detroit advertising agency for Chevrolet. Pritikin remained the creative director of the agency.

San Francisco author Armistead Maupin credits Pritikin's turning him down for a job as being responsible for Maupin's writing Tales of the City.

== Hotelier ==
In 1977 Pritikin opened the "Mansion Hotel", a bed and breakfast at the Chambers Mansion at 2220 Sacramento Street, Pacific Heights, where he would entertain guests with magic shows and musical performances. The hotel, consisting of two Queen Anne mansions connected by a hallway, was decorated eclectically with caged and uncaged birds (including a Macaw sometimes said to be the reincarnation of the house's original owner), pig memorabilia, life-sized stuffed dolls of Bill and Hillary Clinton, Richard Nixon's letter of resignation as United States President and Gerald Ford's letter of pardon, fresh flowers and candy in every room, a central music system that always played classical music, and a player piano that was supposedly played by "Claudia", a ghost. The hotel had a collection of sculptures in its yard.

Pritikin opened the hotel on election days as a local polling station, encouraging voters with music, an ice sculpture in the shape of an eagle, layer cake and caviar. In 2000 he sold the hotel, by then designated a city landmark, as private housing.

== Chenery Mansion ==
In 1986, Pritikin built a French neoclassical facade mansion at 47 Chenery Street for himself in the quiet residential neighborhood of Glen Park, San Francisco. The building, also known as "Chenery House", was the largest private property in the city, featuring a swimming pool inside a second story living room. In 2009, Guy Colwell painted a 70-foot mural on the exterior of the house.

Pritikin was notorious for throwing eccentric parties at the house, including political fundraisers, an annual Labor Day party for 850 people, and a yearly passover seder. His concluding "Last Supper Passover" (2008) was held as a fundraiser for the Leukemia & Lymphoma Society co-hosted by nominee 2008 Woman of the Year, Daphne Evans, a cancer survivor and founder of Heaven's Door Oncology, a cancer foundation.

Pritkin was an avid classical musical saw performer, often hosting performances. Frequent performers, other than Pritikin himself, have included Bob Weir and Ratdog, Carol Channing, and Tammy Faye Messner. Other guests over the years have ranged from Mickey Rooney to Liberace. In one event he bussed thirty guests to San Jose for dinner at the Wendy's that was the site of the infamous chili finger incident.

Pritikin is a collector of many things. His art collection is said to be worth at least $40 million. In 2007 he paid $100,000 for one of Hitler's Globes—a world globe that Adolf Hitler had used to plan submarine warfare from his Eagle's Nest compound in the Bavarian Alps, and was taken to California by an American soldier in 1945. In an interview, he claimed it would make a good counterpart to his Benny Bufano sculptures, which celebrated world peace. A replica of the globe was prominently featured in Valkyrie, the thriller about a real-life plot to assassinate Hitler, leading Pritikin to complain that it had been done without his permission.

In 2004 Pritikin offered to bequeath the mansion to the City of San Francisco for use as an official mayoral residence, but the city rejected his plans.

The house was used for a period as a rental event center. In 2009, he announced plans to operate his home as a museum. It opened as the private, not-for-profit Pritikin Museum. In 2018, the house went on the market at US$12.5 million, and later was reduced to US$5.5 million.

== Controversies ==
In 2014, Pritikin claimed in a self-biographical video that he stands at the origins of the word "Google" because he used it decades ago in a headline of an ad in the Sierra Club, "don't muddy up the googol".

== Books published ==
- Robert C. Pritikin (1980). Christ Was an Ad Man. A witty and wild testament on how to create the miracle ads. Harbor Pub., Distributed by Putnam in San Francisco, [New York, N.Y.] . Written in English. Classifications Dewey Decimal Class 659.1 Library of Congress HF5810.P73 A33 1980. an autobiography "He thinks big, spends small. His ads are sheer genius." -Advertising Age. .
- Robert Pritikin (1991). Pritikin's Testament: Miracle Ads for Big & Small Advertisers, Retailers, and Entrepreneurs. Prentice Hall. ISBN 0-13-585191-2.
- Robert C. Pritikin (2012). Highway House. Regent Press.
