= Grace Gimmini Potts =

Author and director of pageants

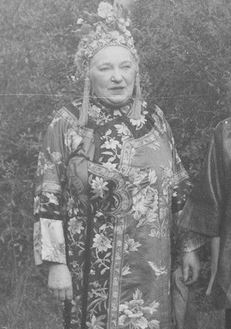
Grace Gimmini Potts

Grace Gimmini Potts (1886-1956) was an author and director of pageants.

== Early life ==
Grace Giminni was born in San Francisco, California, in 1886, the daughter of Hugo Gimmini (1859-1905) and Magdalene Gimmini (1861-1935).

== Career ==
Grace Gimmini Potts was the chairman of Literature and Drama for the California Federation of Women's Clubs, San Joaquin, Valley District. She was the author and director of pageants: "Pageant of Gold," "Jewels of Samarkand," "Memory Lane," "Garden of the Sun." She was a matron of the Order of the Eastern Star, Fresno, California. She was president of the Parlor Lecture Club. She was member of the Parthenon Club.

Using the pen-name of Grace G. Parks she wrote Bad Dames: A Peek at a Problem Taboo (1939).

She traveled internationally as a lecturer on costume history. Her presentations included informational content and were delivered to a range of audiences.

In 1945 she presented two programs for the Washington Parent-Teacher Association; one meeting featured a travelogue of Java, Singapore, Malay and China; another meeting presented a foreign fashion revue. The costume included those from India, a native sari, the native girl's dress from Ceylon, the sarongs from Java, the "slong" from Makassar, an authentic Shinto priest robe from Japan, the "lava lava" from Pago Pago, temple dancer's costume from Bali and Manchu princess robe from China. Potts visited 57 countries, travelling 500,000 miles by land, sea and air in 15 years. She visited Europe four times and the orient three times. She also spent some time in South America, including Brazil and Argentine. She saw all the Central American states and made a flying trip to the jungles of Yucatán. She spent some time in Java, Makassar and Bali.

== Personal life ==
Grace Gimmini Potts moved to Fresno, California, in 1916 and lived at 1932 Broadway, Fresno, California. She married William Lambert Potts (1881-1941).

She died on August 27, 1956, and is buried with her family and husband at Cypress Lawn Memorial Park, Colma.
