= Chambers Mansion =

Historic house in San Francisco, California, built in 1887

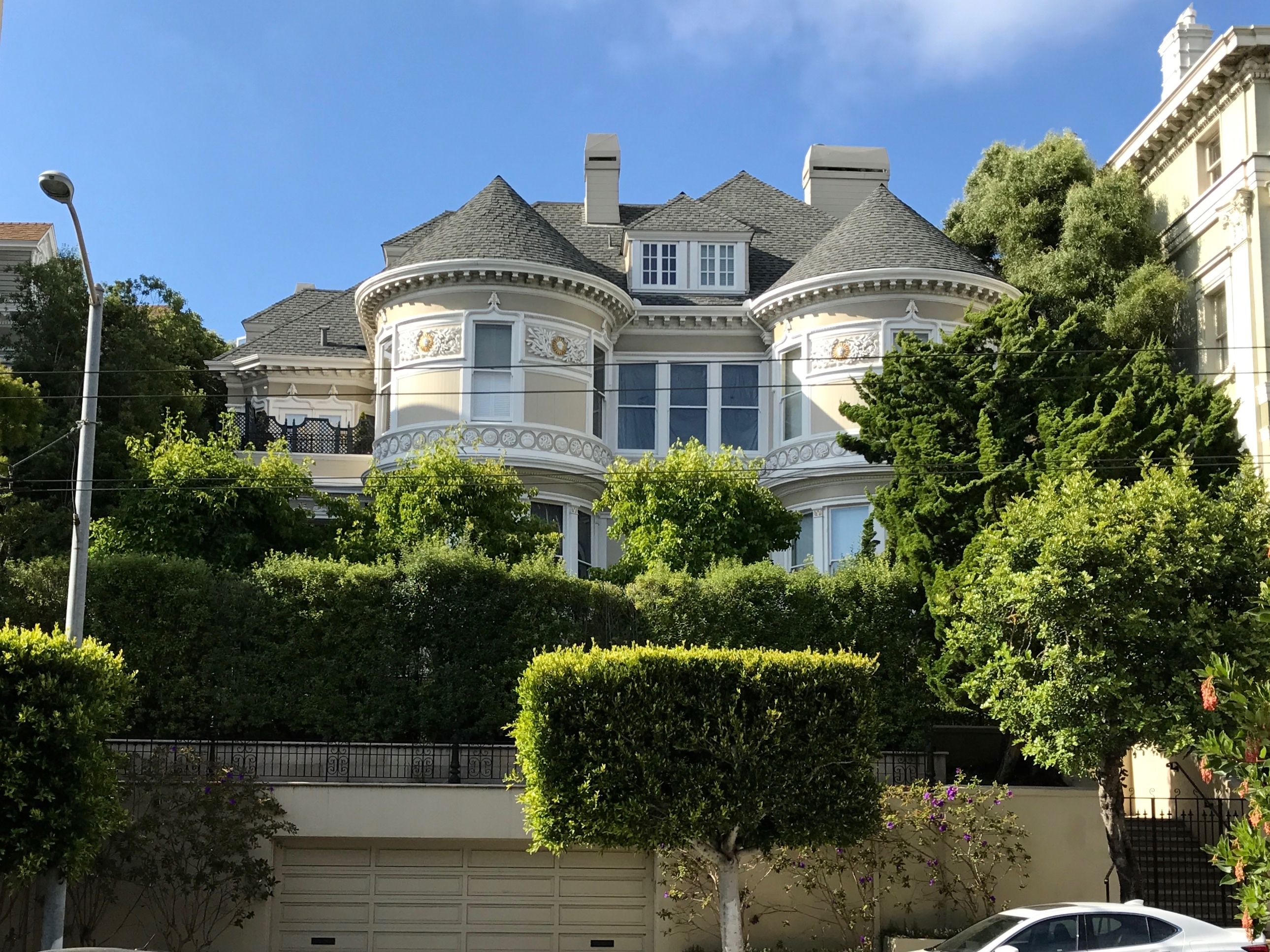
- Chambers Mansion in 2017

- Location within San Francisco County Location within California Location within the United States
- 37.791290°N 122.430237°W
- Location: 2220 Sacramento Street, San Francisco, California, U.S.

History
- Built: 1887
- Built for: R. C. Chambers

Site notes
- Architect(s): Julius Case Mathews, J. C. Mathews & Son
- Architectural styles: Queen Anne Victorian, Gothic Revival architecture,

San Francisco Designated Landmark
- Designated: October 5, 1980
- Reference no.: 119

The Chambers Mansion is a historic house that was built in 1887, and is located at 2220 Sacramento Street in the Pacific Heights neighborhood of San Francisco, California. In 2010, CBS News declared the Chambers Mansion one of the "scariest haunted houses" in the United States, based on stories of its dark history.

The house is listed as one of the San Francisco Designated Landmark, since October 5, 1980.

== History ==
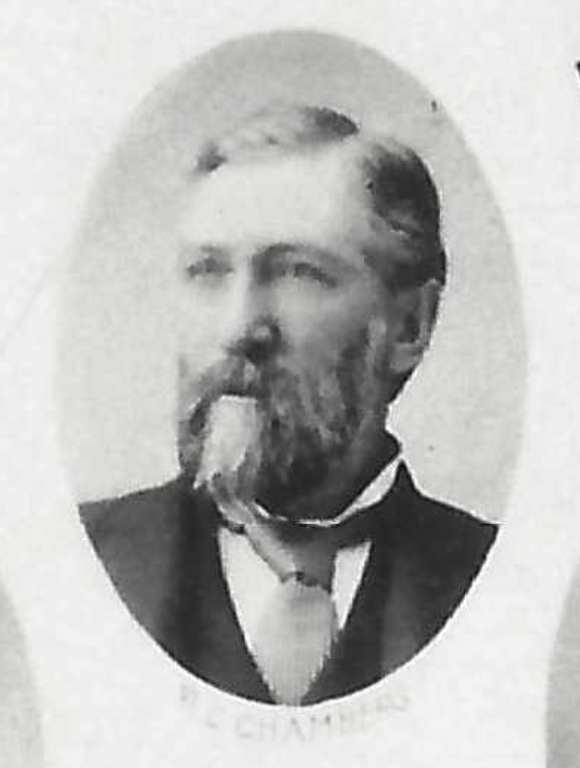
R. C. Chambers (1898), in the 3rd Utah State Legislature

The architect for the house was Julius Case Mathews and the firm J. C. Mathews & Son. The architectural style is Queen Anne Victorian with Gothic and Tuscan details.

The Chambers Mansion was built in 1877 for R. C. Chambers (Robert Craig, sometimes incorrectly identified as Richard Craig; 1832–1901); and for his wife Eudora T. (née Tolles; 1848–1897). Chambers was a Utah mining tycoon, banker, and politician. Eudora Tolles Chambers died in 1897 at the age 48/49, following suicide attempts. After Chamber's death in 1901 and with no direct heirs, his house in San Francisco was inherited. There are conflicting stories about who inherited the house; some stories say his younger sister Ada Chambers; and other stories say it was either his two nieces (or Eudora's two nieces Lillian and Harriet).

In 1917, an addition was added to the house by architect Houghton Sawyer.

In 1977, Bob Pritikin opened the "Mansion Hotel", a bed and breakfast at the Chambers Mansion. The decor as a hotel was eclectic and featured nightly magic shows. In 2000, he sold the hotel, by then it was designated a city landmark, and was converted into two private townhouses.

== Haunting and folklore ==
The Chambers Mansion has been the subject of many stories. The most popular (but untrue) story is Chamber's niece Claudia Chambers lived with her sister in the inherited house, and the sisters did not get along. In 1917, they built a second house on the property so they could live separately. Claudia was murdered, she was sawed in half in what the family claimed as a farming accident. The ghost of Claudia has been seen haunting the house. However, nobody named "Claudia Chambers" ever lived in the house, per city records.

== See also ==
- List of San Francisco Designated Landmarks
