= Columbus Globe for State and Industry Leaders =

Globe owned by Adolf Hitler

Hitler's globe as photographed by a Soviet cameraman visiting the Reich Chancellery, 1945

The Columbus Globe for State and Industry Leaders (also known as Hitler's Globe or the Führer Globe) were two purpose-made globes designed in Berlin in the 1930s, one each for Adolf Hitler and the Nazi Party.

The Columbus Globe for State and Industry Leaders was located in Hitler's office throughout most of its existence. It became widely known in the United States after comedian Charlie Chaplin parodied it in his 1940 film The Great Dictator. Comedy group The Three Stooges also made fun of it in two of their short subject comedies. One of the two limited editions was looted by John Barsamian, a private in the U.S. Army, at Hitler's summer retreat shortly after the war and sold 60 years later at an auction in San Francisco for $100,000. The globe in Hitler's office included Abyssinia as part of Italian East Africa and was known for its size as well as manufacturing cost.

== Origin ==
Two limited editions of the globe were made in Berlin in the mid-1930s: one for the Nazi Party and another one specifically for Adolf Hitler. Unlike the other one, Hitler's globe reflected the annexation of Abyssinia (today's Ethiopia) to Italian East Africa as a result of the Second Italo-Ethiopian War. The other was made of standard wood with no special features. The actual number of globes produced cannot be verified as the factory that produced the globe, along with its archives, was destroyed in air raids in 1943.

Wolfram Pobanz, Polish historian and globe enthusiast, believes that even though it was located in his office, Hitler was probably not particularly fond of the globe, declaring:

Hitler probably didn't think anything about the globe. There's no picture of Hitler beside the globe. He controlled all photographs of himself. If the globe had actually meant anything special to Hitler, there would surely be a photograph.

In 1938, Hitler decided that the old Reich Chancellery was not big enough to house the ministries of Nazi Germany. He assigned his favourite architect Albert Speer to build the new Chancellery. After the massive renovations were completed in early 1939 per Hitler's insistence, the globe was moved to Hitler's new office located at the heart of the new Chancellery, where it remained until the Soviets occupied the building in April 1945.

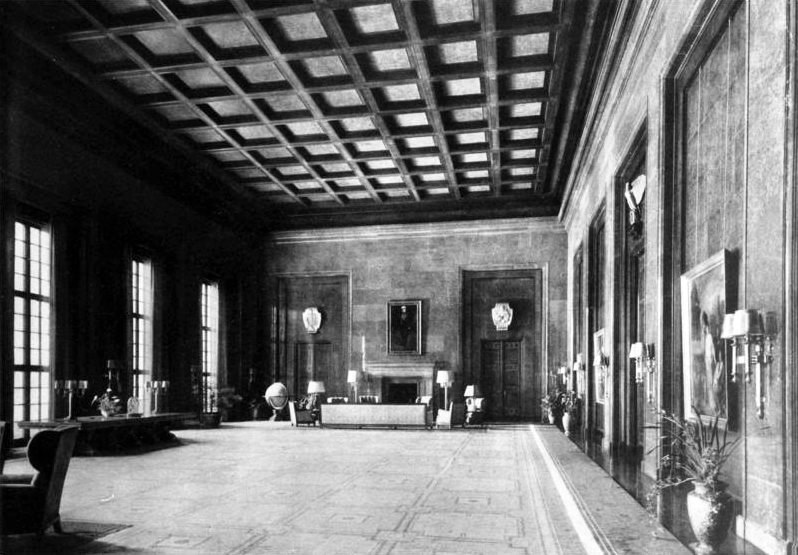
Hitler's office at the new Chancellery in 1939. A globe can be seen to the left of the armchairs and couch.

In 1941, an army adjutant pointed out to Speer an ordinary pencil line which Hitler had drawn on his globe at the Berghof, running north-south along the Ural mountains, signifying the future boundary of Germany's sphere of influence with that of Japan.

== Whereabouts ==
Numerous globes purported to have been owned by Hitler exist throughout the world, although the authenticity of many of them is doubtful. There are a total of three in Berlin: one at a geographical institute, another at the Marcher Museum, and the third at the German Historical Museum. Another two reside in public collections in Munich. Many of the globes show Germany with a bullet hole or simply wiped out, an act committed out of contempt by either Soviet or U.S. soldiers. Based on photographic evidence, none of these globes are the one from Hitler's office in the Chancellery.

In May 1945, one globe allegedly owned by Hitler was found by U.S. soldier John Barsamian among the ruins of the Berghof, Hitler's home on the Obersalzberg near Berchtesgaden, where he often lived when not in Berlin. The house had been nearly completely looted by the time Barsamian arrived. He took the globe home and kept it for 60 years before selling it at an auction in San Francisco in 2007. Bob Pritikin, an entrepreneur from San Francisco, bought the globe for $100,000, five times the original estimated price of $20,000.

In September 2007, historian Wolfram Pobanz declared that the copy of the giant globe with a bullet hole in the German Historical Museum in Berlin is not Hitler's, but another one that is thought to have belonged to Joachim von Ribbentrop, the Nazi foreign minister, and offered no clue as to where the globe that belonged to Hitler is today.

== Legacy ==
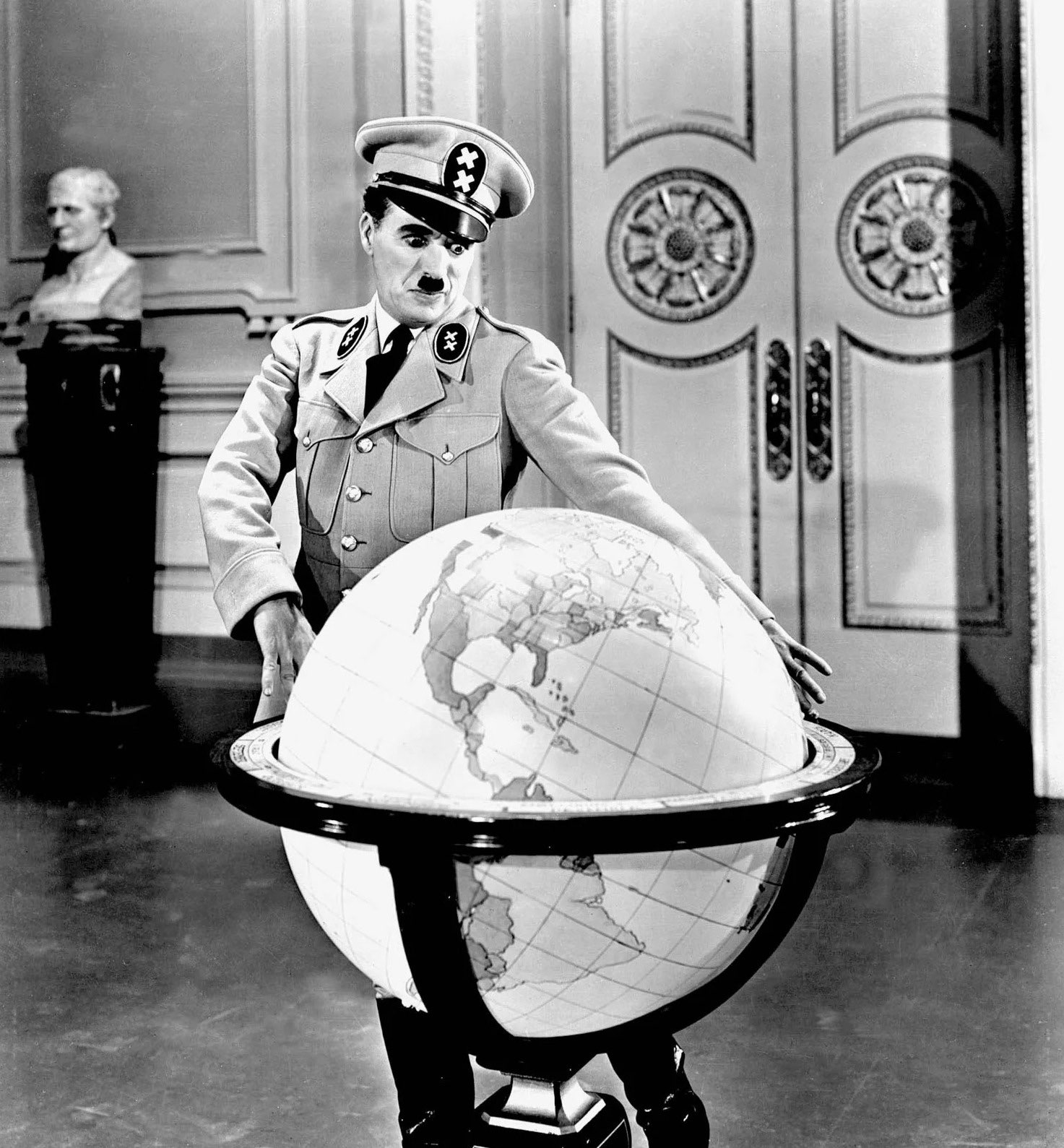
The Columbus Globe for State and Industry Leaders being parodied in a publicity still for The Great Dictator

The globe is regarded as a metaphorical representation of Hitler's alleged megalomaniacal desire for world conquest. It features in Hollywood's first satire of Hitler and the Nazis, The Three Stooges' short subject You Nazty Spy!, released in January 1940.

In Charlie Chaplin's The Great Dictator, released in October 1940, the globe is portrayed as a beach ball that bursts in front of the face of dictator Adenoid Hynkel.

In the Three Stooges' I'll Never Heil Again, a sequel to You Nazty Spy! released in July 1941, the "Axel" partners of Moronikan dictator "Moe Hailstone" play a game of keep away with the globe. Hailstone's military commander, "Field Marshal Herring," eventually smashes the globe over Hailstone's head.

== Sources ==
- de Quetteville, Harry (21 September 2007). "Globe made for Hitler is missing, says historian". The Daily Telegraph.
- Rubenstein, Steve (18 October 2007). "Hitler's Globe Turns Up In Oakland Rumpus Room". San Francisco Chronicle.
- "The Fatal Attraction of Adolf Hitler". BBC.
- Kimmelman, Michael (18 September 2007). "The Mystery of Hitler's Globe Goes Round and Round". The New York Times.
