= Neva Aymar =

Neva Aymar O'Connor
- Born: April 19, c. 1885; Pike, New York
- Died: 1 February 1932 (aged 46); New York City
- Occupation: Actress
- Years active: 1891 – 1911

Neva Aymar (c. 1885 - 1932) was an early twentieth century stage actress. She married jockey, Winfield "Winnie" Scott O'Connor.

== Early life ==
Neva Aymar was born in Pike, New York on April 19 in either 1885, 1886, or 1889, reportedly in the dressing room of a theater. Her mother, Grace Aymar (nee Harrington), was an acrobatic horse rider in the Walter L. Main circus in the 1880s and her father, William Fred Aymar, was a circus clown and performer. Her parents were distant cousins and married in Pike, New York in 1882. Grace Aymar toured the mid-western and western United States under the stage name Clara Corbett.

Fred Aymar was the equestrian director for the Walter L. Main circus in the 1890s. He died in December 1897 at age 42 after falling from a train in Dayton, Ohio and was buried at the Woodland Cemetery and Arboretum.

== Acting career ==
In March 1896, Aymar portrayed Eva in a rendition of Uncle Tom's Cabin at the Gilliss Theater in Kansas City.

== Personal life ==
Aymar married jockey Winnie O'Connor in February 1911 in Gouvieux, France after he divorced his first wife Edna Loftus.

== Death ==
Neva Aymar O'Connor died on February 1, 1932 from complications of tuberculosis, which she reportedly contracted during the first World War. She was buried at Maple Grove Cemetery in Queens on February 4.
