= R. C. Chambers =

American 19th-century businessman, politician (1832–1901)

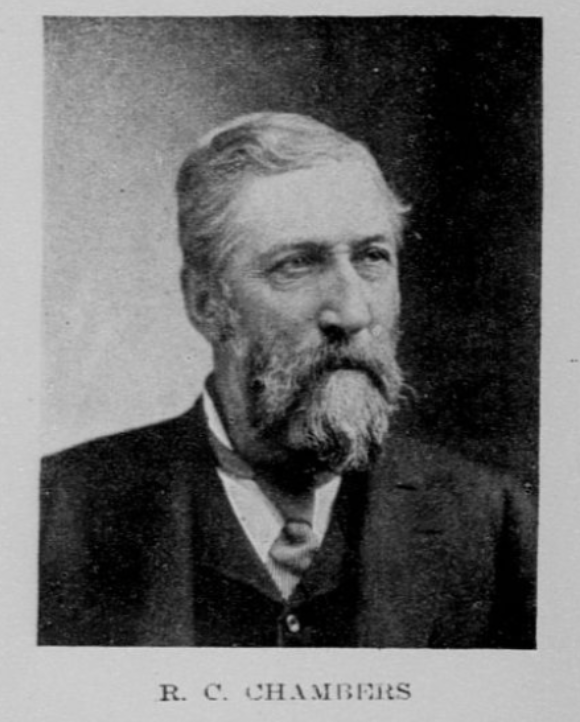
- Born: Robert Craig Chambers; January 16, 1832; Lexington, Ohio, U.S.
- Died: April 11, 1901 (aged 69); San Francisco, California, U.S.
- Burial place: Laurel Hill Cemetery, and later moved to Cypress Lawn Memorial Park
- Other names: Robert C. Chambers, Richard Craig Chamber
- Occupations: Silver mine supervisor, minerals miner, businessman, banker, sheriff, politician
- Spouse: Eudora T. Tolles (m. 1884–1897; death)

Robert Craig Chambers (January 16, 1832 – April 11, 1901) was an American 19th-century businessman, minerals miner, banker, politician, sheriff, and silver mine supervisor. He had mining investments in many states, and was one of the best-known miners in the west. Chambers was a prominent figure in the formation of Butte, Montana, and Park City, Utah; and was named one of Utah's Bonanza Kings because he led the operation of the Ontario silver mine near Park City, from 1872 until 1891.

Chambers was a state senator for Utah's District 5, starting in 1895 during the early formation of the state.

== Early life and family ==
Robert Craig Chambers was born on January 16, 1832, in Lexington, Richland County, Ohio; to parents Jane (née Foster) and James Chambers. He is sometimes misidentified with the name Richard Craig Chamber, but he primarily used his initials R. C.. He was of Scottish descent.

He married Eudora T. Tolles in 1884 in San Francisco, California. They never had children. Eudora was from a pioneer family from Rushville, Illinois; and her sister Mabel B. Tolles Ray was married to William H. Ray, a member of the United States House of Representatives from Illinois.

In 1893, Eudora survived an attempted suicide by jumping in front of a moving train in San Francisco, she had a history of mental instability.

== Career ==
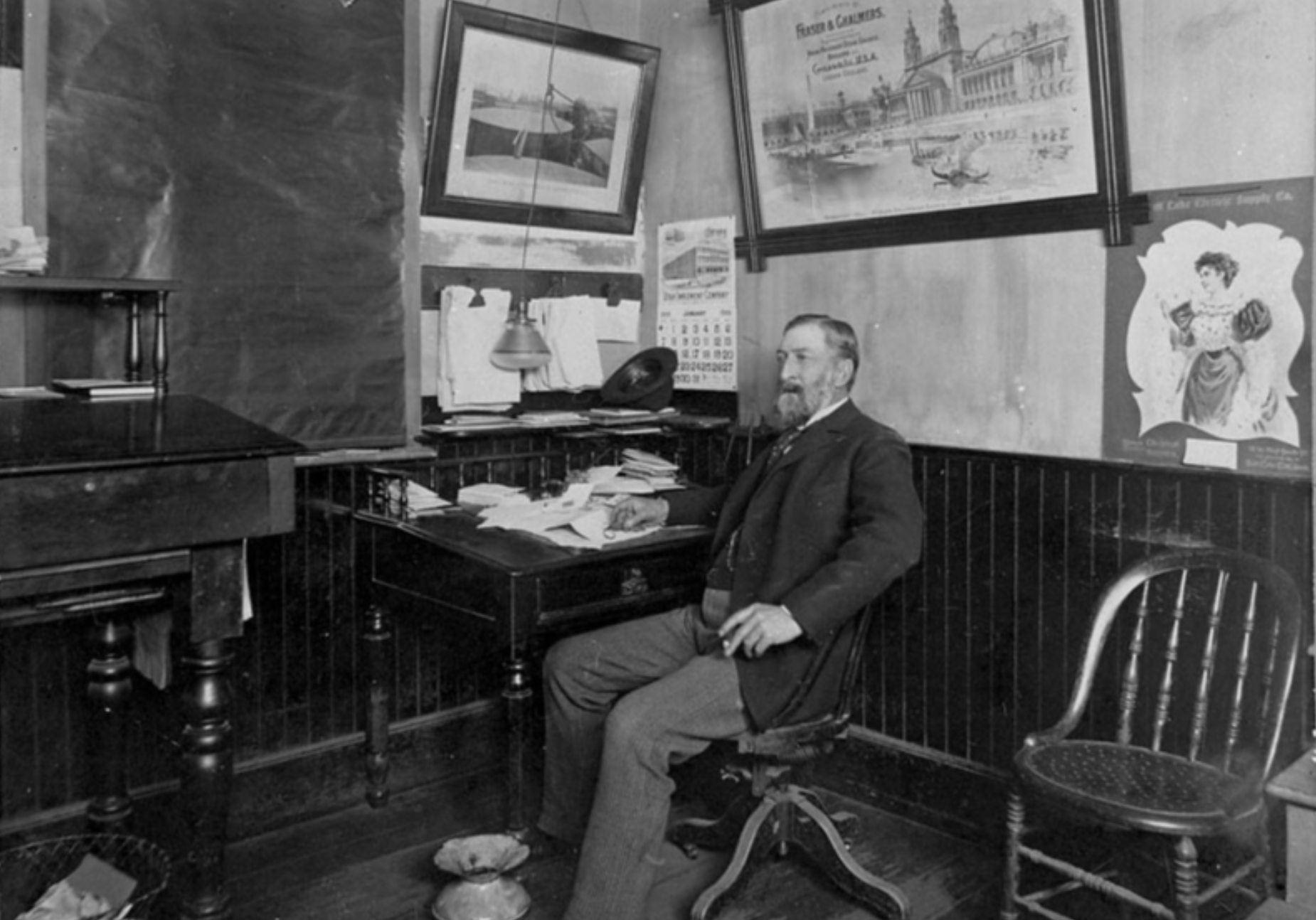
R.C. Chambers in the Ontario Mine office (January 1900)

=== The California Gold Rush ===
Chambers was attracted to move west because of the California Gold Rush, and arrived in Sacramento, California, in July 1850. He started mining work at Mormon Island along the American River. A year later he moved to the Feather River Gold Mines in Plumas County, where he befriended The Salt Lake Tribune newspaper editor Judge Goodwin. In 1858, Chambers was elected sheriff of Plumas County.

In 1869, Chambers moved to Nevada to scout mines; followed with a move in September 1870 to Utah because of an interest in the Cottonwood mines.

=== Career in Park City and Butte, house in San Francisco ===
From 1872 until 1891, Chambers served as the superintendent of the Ontario silver mine, which was owned by George Hearst. Chambers had helped facilitate Hearst's purchase of the mine in 1872. Through his relationship with Hearst, Chambers was able to meet other powerful people in mining and finance.

In 1877, Chambers had commissioned the Chambers Mansion at 2220 Sacramento Street in San Francisco. His wife sometimes lived in the Chambers Mansion when her husband was working in other states, in order to be closer to her mother; as well as living in Salt Lake City with her husband.

In 1882, Chambers co-founded Hoge, Brownlee, and Company, the first bank in Butte, Montana; working alongside Marcus Daly and Hoge Brownlee. In 1899, the business became Daly & Company, and later became the Metals Bank & Trust Co. Chambers. The Chambers Syndicate, a consortium of investors was led by Chambers working under Marcus Daly. The Chambers Syndicate group owned many notable lodes claims. In December 1888, the Hoge Brownlee, Chambers bank loans were defaulted on by the Mountain Consolidated Mining Company (an incident that has been nicknamed the "Mountain Con"). The award of US$194,902.20 was assigned to Chambers, and the mining operations, valued at more than $116,000, was assigned to the Chambers Syndicate. However Marcus Daly was an original Trustee of the Mountain Consolidated company, as well as a member of the Chambers group.

In 1891, Chambers served as the president of the Salt Lake Stock Exchange.

When Albion Bernard Emery (1846–1894) died, the former partner in the Mayflower and Silver King Mines, Chambers had sued his estate in claiming that they had a "handshake deal" with an investment, and Emery still owed him money. Chambers lost the lawsuit.

Chambers was a states senator for District 5 in Utah, starting in 1895 during the early formation of the state. He served as a Democrat in the 1st Utah State Legislature from 1895 to 1896, the 2nd Utah State Legislature from 1896 to 1897, and the 3rd Utah State Legislature from 1897 to 1898.

== Death ==
He died on April 11, 1901, of appendicitis at the age 69, in San Francisco. He was initially interred at Laurel Hill Cemetery in San Francisco; when that closed around 1940, he was re-interred to Cypress Lawn Memorial Park in Colma California.

After his death and with no direct heirs, his two nieces inherited his house in San Francisco.

== See also ==
- Mining communities of the California Gold Rush
- List of people associated with the California Gold Rush
