= Edna Loftus =

English actress

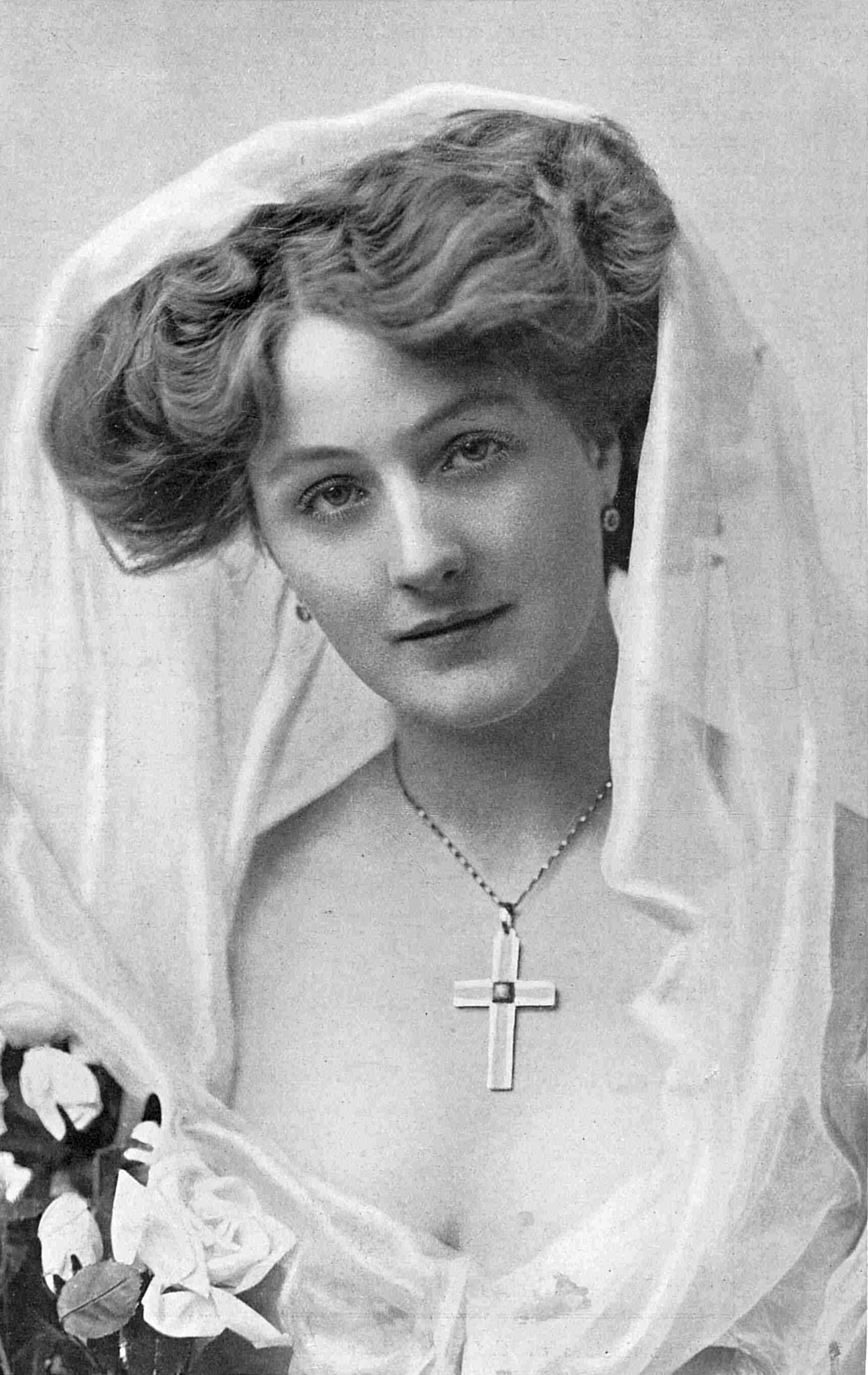
- Edna Loftus in 1906 dressed for a role in the musical comedy The Catch of the Season
- Born: c. 1891 (Note: Her death certificate approximates her age at 25 years.); London, England
- Died: 15 June 1916 (aged 25); San Francisco, United States
- Occupation: Actress
- Years active: 1906–c. 1911

Edna Loftus (c. 1891 – 15 June 1916) was a British actress who was briefly married to champion jockey Winfield O'Connor and gained notoriety in the United States for marrying Harry A. Rheinstrom, the heir to a Cincinnati brewing fortune, against the wishes of his family in 1910. While trained for musical theater in her early career in London, she was a cafe singer and hotel operator during her later years in California as a means to support herself during her second husband's illness. She died in poverty in San Francisco in 1916 of tuberculosis after divorcing Rheinstrom in 1914.

== Acting career ==
Edna Loftus was born in London and grew up in Southwark. She first appeared at The Palace in a February 1906 revival of the musical comedy The Catch of the Season and as a female attendant in Madame Lingerie. She starred in the 1906 adaptation of The New Aladdin in the role of Madge Oliphant for the Gaiety Theater. While not a primary role, she was lauded by the theater publication The Tatler as being "a beauty", her photographs appearing in many of the publicity items for New Aladdin. She continued acting in the New Aladdin for most of 1906, but by December was starring in a production of The Babes in the Wood at the Theatre Royal, Edinburgh where she played the role of Molly the miller's daughter. By July 1907, she was performing in a revue Tu veux rire (You Want to Laugh) at the Ambassadeurs in Paris with Max Dearly and dancers Gaby Deslys and Vera Barton.

Loftus moved to the United States with her first husband in 1907 and traveled with the vaudeville acting troupe the Rain Dears in 1909. While some sources identified Cissie Loftus as her sister, she is not related to the actress.

== Personal life ==
Edna Loftus married twice, first to the jockey Winfield S. "Winnie" O'Connor (1881–1947) in 1907 and second to American brewing fortune heir, Harry A. Rheinstrom (1884–1918), in 1910. Lack of evidence of her divorce from O'Connor was later used as grounds for deportation from the United States in an immigration dispute in 1913.

=== Marriage to Winnie O'Connor ===
Edna Loftus reportedly met champion American jockey Winfield Scott "Winnie" O'Connor at Eva Beaumont's Chicago Bar on the rue Taitbout in Paris. They were married on 26 June 1907 in Berlin and again by the American consul in Chantilly on 22 November to incorporate both Roman Catholic and Protestant ceremonies, as they were of different religious faiths. On the return voyage to New York, Loftus was almost blown overboard by a strong wind that struck the ship as she walked on the deck. Loftus left O'Connor and their divorce was finalized in September 1909 in Senlis.

=== Marriage to Harry A. Rheinstrom ===
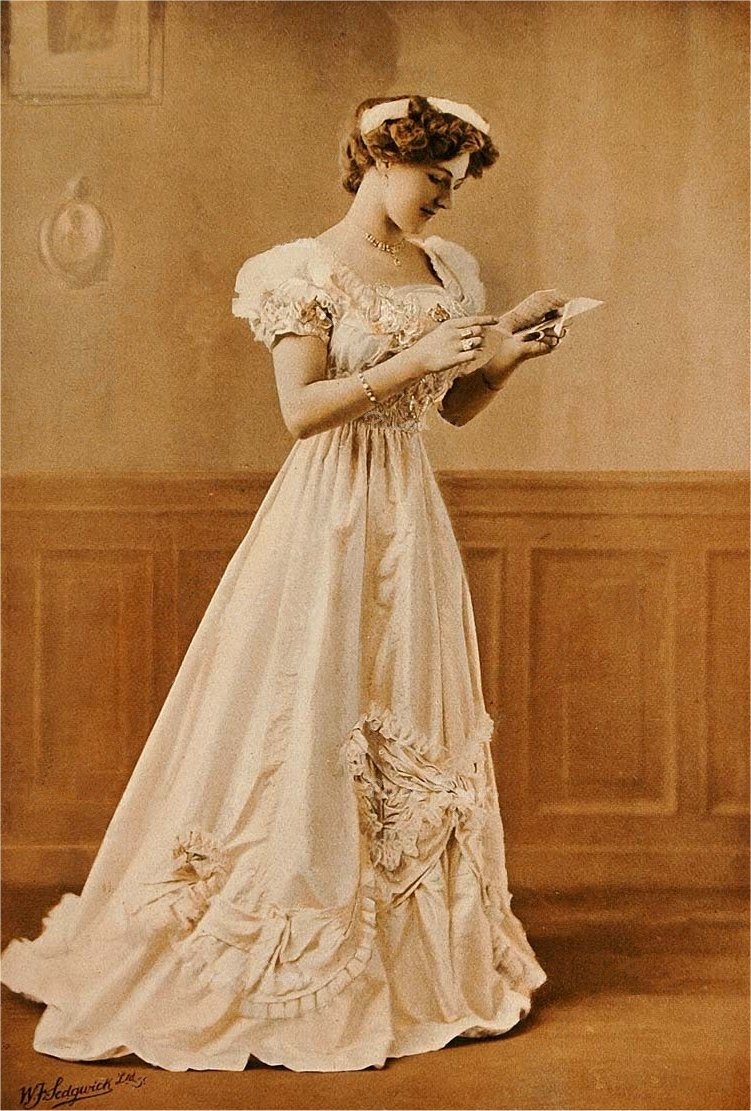
Edna Loftus as photographed by Ellis and Walery, c. 1906

Edna Loftus remained in the United States after her divorce from O'Connor was finalized in 1909. She met 25-year-old Harry A. Rheinstrom in a lobster palace in New York City while acting on Broadway, with Rheinstrom spending $10,000 on gifts for Edna. Rheinstrom was heir to a $6 million distillery fortune left by his father Abraham Rheinstrom, a Cincinnati brewer. The couple traveled to Cincinnati in the last week of December 1909 to marry, but Harry's mother greatly disapproved of the marriage and had her son committed to an asylum and Edna arrested for loitering (a charge that was quickly dismissed). Loftus successfully applied for release of Rheinstrom on a habeas corpus writ in January 1910. The couple drove through the deep snow to obtain a marriage license in neighboring Independence, Kentucky and were married by a magistrate in Covington on 7 January 1910. Rheinstrom was exiled to the western U.S. by his mother, who had complete control over distribution of the family fortune, and was given a $3,000 annuity. The young couple settled on a small ranch approximately 40 miles from Boyle Heights, Los Angeles, and attempted to raise chickens and fruit to make a living. The press reported widely on the change in fortune for the actress, from dining on lobsters on the Great White Way to plucking chickens and cleaning house for her husband; the couple was stated as making a "declaration of supreme happiness" to each other.

However, the couple gave up farming in August 1910 and began reconciliation talks with Harry's mother. They moved to Oakland in September 1910, living on a $200 a month allowance given by Mrs. Rheinstrom. Upon moving to town, the Rheinstroms reportedly spent the monthly allowance within three days and borrowed large sums of money. On 21 September, Harry Rheinstrom was taken to a local sanatorium after refusing to eat for several days and telling police that someone was trying to poison him. To cover the cost of her husband's psychiatric treatment, Loftus contracted with a San Francisco cafe to give nightly concerts for a six-week period. Rheinstrom was initially committed to a local asylum in Fruitvale run by Dr. Frank S. Lowell, but was arrested after Loftus organized his escape. In October 1910, Edna Loftus garnered further embarrassment for the Rheinstrom family when she was arrested for failure to pay a $3.60 taxi fare. These excesses led Mrs. Rheinstrom to cut off their allowance and initiate court proceedings in November 1910 that ultimately led to a guardianship for Harry Rheinstrom without Edna's influence and to him being committed to the state asylum in Stockton, where he would remain for the remainder of their marriage. After the judgement, Loftus was unable to find work in vaudeville and attempted suicide on 20 December 1910 by throwing herself in Spreckels Lake, where she was rescued by a passing motorist.

==== Legal battles with the Rheinstroms ====
Loftus considered suing for divorce from Rheinstrom in early 1911 and hired an attorney, the former Olympic athlete Ralph Rose to represent her interests. On hearing the news, her mother-in-law replied, "We never wanted Harry to marry her, and I only hope that she does get a divorce because he can get out of the sanatorium into which she was the cause of his going." While traveling with Rose by train from San Jose to Oakland on 24 October 1911 to reach a possible settlement with the Rheinstroms, Loftus suffered a mental breakdown ("hysteria" as indicated by the press) at the Oakland train depot and was committed to the Oakland Receiving Hospital for treatment. The cause of the illness was presumed to be related to continued legal difficulties with Mrs. Rheinstrom, with her sudden "elation" over a possible settlement with the Rheinstroms giving way to depression on release from hospital.

I'm through. Millions are stronger than maids. Especially merry, merry maids.

— Edna Loftus, 1911

Still married to Rheinstrom, Loftus was arrested on 9 April 1913 by Deputy U.S. Marshal J. A. Robinson, acting for Bureau of Immigration Captain Frank Ainsworth, on the grounds that she was an "undesirable alien," with some sources reporting that she had interests in a "resort" of ill repute in the Barbary Coast section of the city where she lived under the alias Ethel O'Connor. Taken to Angel Island, she countered that she could not be deported to Britain because she was lawfully married to Rheinstrom and was a citizen. The legality of her marriage to Rheinstrom was questioned on the grounds that she had not obtained a divorce from O'Connor. Ultimately, her marriage was declared valid and she was not deported. Frustrated with the situation, she declared that she would like to return to England but ultimately traveled to Cincinnati a few months later in September 1913 to begin divorce proceedings against Rheinstrom.

==== Later legal issues ====
Loftus was involved in several scandals in the early 1910s apart from her dealings with the Rheinstroms. In 1912, Loftus was named in the divorce suit of Dr. Wade Stone in San Rafael, California. On 8 March 1912, Loftus was thrown from Dr. Stone's car into a creek during a nighttime drive through Ross Valley. Dr. Stone was reportedly helping Loftus seek a cure for her nerves when the accident occurred, but his wife suspected the doctor was in a relationship with Loftus and won her suit for divorce. Due to negative publicity from the court case and rumors of other dalliances with local men, Loftus was given one hour to leave San Rafael by the city marshal, Edward J. Daly, on 4 August 1912. Loftus complied within the time frame and relocated to San Francisco. She was questioned by the San Francisco police in the disappearance of a gold watch in February 1913, but was not charged with a crime. Angry at the suspicion, she claimed she wanted to leave California and move to Honolulu, stating, "They don't know how to treat a lady in this town."

== Death ==
After the divorce from Rheinstrom was finalized in 1914, Loftus supported herself by managing a low-rent hotel, The Art, on Kearney St. in the Tenderloin area of San Francisco. The hotel was frequently raided by the police, with Loftus being arrested on one occasion for "vagrancy" shortly after attempting suicide for a second time. Loftus was taken to the City Hospital in San Francisco in early June 1916 due to worsening symptoms of tuberculosis. She died in hospital on 15 June 1916. At that time, she was so impoverished that plans were initially made to bury her in a potter's field in the local cemetery. After anonymous friends intervened, (Note: Her funeral was ordered by Lee Earl of 731 Commercial St., at the time a notorious brothel on the Barbary Coast.) she was buried in Cypress Lawn Cemetery. Harry Rheinstrom was released from the state hospital in February 1914 shortly after the divorce was finalized. He never remarried and was killed on 14 October 1918 after he fell at a Philadelphia shipyard while working for the government (predeceasing his mother). Her first husband, Winnie O'Connor, married the actress Neva Aymar (d. 1932) and died on 6 March 1947 after losing his fortune in the stock market crash of 1929.

For a biography of Loftus see David Grasse, From the Footlights to the Tenderloin – The Tragic Life of Actress Edna Loftus (McFarland, 2024).
