= 3rd Utah State Legislature =

The 3rd Utah State Legislature was elected Tuesday, November 8, 1898, and convened on Monday, January 9, 1899.

== Dates of sessions ==
- 1899 Biennial Session: January 9, 1899

== Utah Senate ==
=== Members ===
| Name | Party | District |
|---|---|---|
| Alder, Ferdinand | Republican | 9 |
| Bennion, Harden | | 12 |
| Cannon, Martha H. | | 6 |
| Chambers, Robert C. | | 5 |
| Evans, Abel J. | | 7 |
| Howell, Joseph | | 2 |
| Kiesel, Fred J. | | 4 |
| Nebeker, Aquila | | 3 |
| Nebeker, William G. | | 1 |
| Perry, David H. | | 6 |
| Rideout, David O. | | 6 |
| Robison, Joseph V. | | 8 |
| Shurtliff, Lewis W. | | 4 |
| Smoot, Abraham O. | | 7 |
| Tanner, Rollin R. | | 11 |
| Thomas, Richard K. | | 6 |
| Whitney, Orson F. | Democrat | 6 |
| Wright, Isaac K. | | 10 |

== Utah House of Representatives ==
=== Members ===
| Name | Party | District |
|---|---|---|
| Bennion, Heber | Democrat | 8 |
| Betts, John E. | Democrat | 11 |
| Bramwell, George W. | | 4 |
| Bywater, Joseph G. | | 8 |
| Callister, Thomas C. | | 19 |
| Christiansen, Parley | | 14 |
| Clyde, James W. | | 10 |
| Cook, David S. | | 3 |
| Crosby, Jesse W. | | 23 |
| Cummings, Horace | | 8 |
| Farr, Aaron F. | | 2 |
| Fisher, John | | 6 |
| Forman, Albert W. | | 8 |
| Fullmer, John H. | | 21 |
| Greenwood, Barnard H. | | 18 |
| Hansen, John E. | | 8 |
| Harris, Charles Z. | | 2 |
| Harris, Nathan J. | | 4 |
| Holmgren, John P. | | 1 |
| Horne, Alice Merrill | Democrat | 8 |
| Ivers, James | | 9 |
| Jackson, Charles M. | | 8 |
| Johnson, Tillman D. | | 4 |
| Lapish, Joseph | | 11 |
| Larsen, Marinus | | 11 |
| Law, Albert A. | | 2 |
| Lloyd, Benjamin T. | | 8 |
| Mansfield, M. W. | | 22 |
| McQuarrie, John G. | | 25 |
| Miller, Reuben G. | | 15 |
| Murdock, John R. | | 20 |
| O'Neil, William | | 12 |
| Parry, John | | 24 |
| Redd, Lemuel H. | | 27 |
| Richards, George F. | | 7 |
| Robertson, Jasper | | 16 |
| Robinson, Joseph E. | | 26 |
| Roylance, William M. | | 11 |
| Shephard, Richard B. | | 8 |
| Smith, Sherman S. | | 4 |
| Sorenson, C. W. | | 14 |
| Stewart, Samuel W. | | 8 |
| Taylor, Lester | | 17 |
| Welch, Charles A. | | 5 |
| Wheeler, Claude V. | | 13 |

== See also ==
- List of Utah state legislatures
