= Marinus Larsen =

American politician (1849–1934)

Member of the Utah House of Representatives from the 11th district
- Preceded by: first officeholder

Personal details
- Born: November 15, 1849 Aalborg Municipality, Denmark
- Died: August 2, 1934 (aged 84) Spanish Fork, Utah
- Party: Democratic
- Spouse: Johanna (m. February 13, 1869)

Marinus Larsen (November 15, 1849 – August 2, 1934) was a Latter-day Saint religious leader and a member of the first Utah state legislature, representing the 11th district.

== Early life and career ==
Larsen was born in Hurup, Als parish, Aalborg Municipality, Denmark. He converted to the Church of Jesus Christ of Latter-day Saints (LDS Church) in 1862. That same year he emigrated to the United States, settling in Spanish Fork, Utah Territory in September. He remained there for the rest of his life.

In 1891, when the one LDS Church ward in Spanish Fork was divided into four, Larsen was made bishop of the Spanish Fork 3rd Ward. He served in that position until 1903.

Larsen served for two terms as mayor of Spanish Fork. He also served on the city council for four terms. He was a member of the Utah House of Representatives for two terms.

== Sources ==
- Andrew Jenson, Encyclopedia History of the Church of Jesus Christ of Latter-day Saints, p. 825.
- Andrew Jenson, Latter Day Saint Biographical Encyclopedia, vol. 3, p. 138-139.
- https://utahstatehistory.omeka.net/exhibits/show/comingtogetherutah/governingstateofutah/representatives
