= National Register of Historic Places listings in East Providence, Rhode Island =

This is a list of Registered Historic Places in East Providence, Rhode Island.

Contents: Counties in Rhode Island

Bristol | Kent | Newport | Providence (Pawtucket | Providence (city) | Woonsocket) | Washington

This National Park Service list is complete through NPS recent listings posted May 1, 2026.

	Name on the Register	Image	Date listed	Location	City or town	Description
1	Bicknell–Armington Lightning Splitter House	Bicknell–Armington Lightning Splitter House	November 28, 1980 (#80000085)	3591 Pawtucket Ave. 41°46′36″N 71°21′47″W	East Providence	
2	Boston and Providence Railroad Bridge	Boston and Providence Railroad Bridge	November 28, 1980 (#80000086)	Spans the Ten Mile River; 41°50′05″N 71°21′45″W	East Providence	
3	Bridgham Farm	Bridgham Farm	November 28, 1980 (#80000087)	120, 148, 150, and 160 Pleasant St. 41°50′13″N 71°20′38″W	East Providence	
4	Carpenter, Lakeside, and Springvale Cemeteries	Carpenter, Lakeside, and Springvale Cemeteries	November 28, 1980 (#80000091)	Newman and Pawtucket Aves. 41°50′33″N 71°21′09″W	East Providence	
5	Crescent Park Looff Carousel	Crescent Park Looff Carousel	April 21, 1976 (#76000045)	Riverside Park; 41°45′24″N 71°21′34″W	East Providence	Restored 1895 carousel features some of Charles I.D. Looff's finest workmanship
6	Nathaniel Daggett House	Nathaniel Daggett House	November 28, 1980 (#80000092)	74 Roger Williams Ave. 41°50′16″N 71°21′46″W	East Providence	
7	James Dennis House	James Dennis House	November 28, 1980 (#80000095)	3120 Pawtucket Ave. 41°47′21″N 71°21′53″W	East Providence	
8	District 6 Schoolhouse	District 6 Schoolhouse	November 28, 1980 (#80000096)	347 Willett Ave. 41°46′23″N 71°21′19″W	East Providence	
9	Elm Tree Plat Historic District	Elm Tree Plat Historic District	November 19, 2015 (#15000829)	Charlotte & Elinora Sts., Fenner, Harvey & Willett Aves. 41°46′13″N 71°21′10″W	East Providence	
10	Little Neck Cemetery	Little Neck Cemetery	November 28, 1980 (#80000100)	Off Read St. 41°45′59″N 71°21′18″W	East Providence	
11	Newman Cemetery	Newman Cemetery	November 28, 1980 (#80000002)	Newman and Pawtucket Aves. 41°50′22″N 71°21′04″W	East Providence	
12	Newman Congregational Church	Newman Congregational Church	November 28, 1980 (#80000003)	100 Newman Ave. 41°50′28″N 71°21′03″W	East Providence	
13	Oddfellow's Hall	Oddfellow's Hall	November 28, 1980 (#80000004)	63-67 Warren Ave. 41°49′01″N 71°22′56″W	East Providence	
14	Phillipsdale Historic District	Phillipsdale Historic District	September 15, 2011 (#11000675)	Roughly bounded by Seekonk River, Roger Williams Ave. & Ruth Ave. 41°50′52″N 71°21′55″W	East Providence	
15	Pomham Rocks Light Station	Pomham Rocks Light Station	July 9, 1979 (#79000001)	Riverside Rd. 41°46′40″N 71°22′13″W	East Providence	
16	Richmond Paper Company Mill Complex	Richmond Paper Company Mill Complex	November 1, 2006 (#06000974)	310 Bourne Ave. 41°50′31″N 71°22′14″W	East Providence	
17	Rose Land Park Plat Historic District	Rose Land Park Plat Historic District	November 19, 2015 (#15000830)	Florence St., Roseland Ct., Dartmouth, Princeton & Willett Aves. 41°46′09″N 71°21′03″W	East Providence	
18	Rumford Chemical Works and Mill House Historic District	Rumford Chemical Works and Mill House Historic District	November 28, 1980 (#80000007)	N. Broadway, Newman, and Greenwood Aves. 41°50′22″N 71°21′16″W	East Providence	
19	Rumford Historic District	Rumford Historic District	November 28, 1980 (#80000008)	Pleasant St. and Greenwood and Pawtucket Aves; 41°49′50″N 71°20′55″W	East Providence	
20	St. Mary's Episcopal Church	St. Mary's Episcopal Church	November 28, 1980 (#80000009)	83 Warren Ave. 41°49′01″N 71°22′54″W	East Providence	
21	Squantum Association	Squantum Association	November 28, 1980 (#80000010)	947 Veterans Memorial Parkway; 41°47′24″N 71°22′25″W	East Providence	
22	Phillip Walker House	Phillip Walker House	June 24, 1972 (#72000006)	432 Massasoit Ave. 41°49′49″N 71°21′50″W	East Providence	
23	Whitcomb Farm	Whitcomb Farm	November 28, 1980 (#80000013)	36 Willett Ave. 41°46′37″N 71°21′45″W	East Providence	
24	World War I Memorial	World War I Memorial	October 19, 2001 (#01000466)	Junction of Taunton Ave. and Weldon St. 41°49′10″N 71°22′15″W	East Providence	

== See also ==
- National Register of Historic Places listings in Providence County, Rhode Island
- List of National Historic Landmarks in Rhode Island
