= USS LST-12 =

US World War II naval vessel

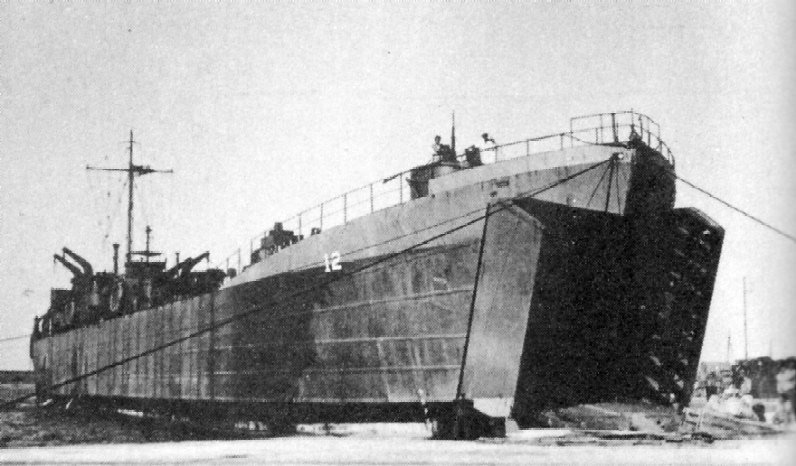
- HM LST-12 beached at Barletta, Italy, July 1944.

History

United States
- Name: LST-12
- Builder: Dravo Corporation, Pittsburgh, Pennsylvania
- Laid down: 16 August 1942
- Launched: 7 December 1942
- Sponsored by: Mrs. Joseph Fay
- Fate: Transferred to the Royal Navy, 25 March 1943

United Kingdom
- Name: LST-12
- Acquired: 25 March 1943
- Commissioned: 26 March 1943
- Out of service: 5 January 1946
- Fate: Returned to US Naval custody

United States
- Acquired: 5 January 1946
- Stricken: 20 March 1946
- Fate: Sold for scrapping, 11 September 1947

General characteristics
- Class & type: LST-1-class tank landing ship
- Displacement: 1,625 long tons (1,651 t) light; 4,080 long tons (4,145 t) full
- Length: 328 ft (100 m)
- Beam: 50 ft (15 m)
- Draft: Unloaded: 2 ft 4 in (0.71 m) forward; 7 ft 6 in (2.29 m) aft; Full load: 8 ft 3 in (2.51 m) forward; 14 ft 1 in (4.29 m) aft; Landing with 500 short tons (450 t) load: 3 ft 11 in (1.19 m) forward; 9 ft 10 in (3.00 m) aft
- Installed power: 2 × 900 hp (670 kW) General Motors 12-567A diesel engines, 1,700 shp (1,300 kW)
- Propulsion: 1 × Falk main reduction gears; 2 × screws
- Speed: 12 kn (22 km/h; 14 mph)
- Range: 24,000 nmi (44,000 km; 28,000 mi) at 9 kn (17 km/h; 10 mph) while displacing 3,960 long tons (4,024 t)
- Boats & landing craft carried: 4 × LCVP
- Capacity: 1,600–1,900 st (22,000–27,000 lb; 10,000–12,000 kg) cargo depending on mission
- Troops: 163
- Complement: 111
- Armament: 1 × 2-pounder 40 mm (1.57 in) anti-aircraft multi-barrel gun; 6 × 20 mm (0.79 in) Oerlikon cannons; 4 × Fast Aerial Mine (FAM) mounts

Service record
- Operations: Sicilian occupation (July–August 1943); Invasion of Reggio (September 1943); Salerno landings (September 1943); Invasion of southern France (August and September 1944)

USS LST-12 was an LST-1-class tank landing ship of the United States Navy. LST-12 was transferred to the Royal Navy in early 1943, to serve in the Mediterranean Theater of Operations during 1943 and 1944. She never saw service with the US Navy.

== Construction ==
LST-12 was laid down on 16 August 1942, by the Dravo Corporation in Pittsburgh, Pennsylvania; launched on 7 December 1942; sponsored by Mrs. Joseph Fay. She was transferred to the Royal Navy 25 March 1943, and commissioned the following day.

== Service history ==
LST-12 left Galveston, Texas, on 10 April 1943, with Convoy HK 168, en route to Key West, Florida, arriving 14 April 1943.

LST-12 left from Hampton Roads, Virginia for the Mediterranean on 14 May 1943, with convoy UGS 8A, arriving in Oran, Algeria, sometime before 8 June 1943, breaking down en route. Records also show that she left Gibraltar on 21 June 1943, with Convoy GTX 3, and traveled to Port Said, Egypt, arriving 4 July 1943.

=== Mediterranean and European operations ===
LST-12 was assigned to the European theater and participated in the Sicilian occupation in July and August 1943, and the Invasion of Reggio and the Salerno landings in September 1943. On 13 November 1943, she struck a mine but was able to make Ferryville under her own power to be repaired. However, records indicate that she was also part of Convoy BM 74 from 11 to 16 November 1943, traveling from Bombay, India to Colombo, British Ceylon.

In August and September 1944, LST-12 was the only British LST to take part in Operation Dragoon, the Invasion of southern France.

From September 1944 to January 1945, she operated between Italy, Yugoslavia, and Greece.

=== Postwar service ===
Between August and October 1945, she was refit at Antwerp before being paid off at New York 5 January 1946, and returned to the US Navy. On 20 March 1946, LST-12 was struck from the Naval Register.

LST-12 was sold for scrapping on 11 September 1947, to Washburn Wire Co., Phillipsdale, Rhode Island.

== Bibliography ==
- "HM LST-12". NavSource. 7 March 2014.
- "LST-12". Dictionary of American Naval Fighting Ships. Naval History and Heritage Command. This article incorporates text from this source, which is in the public domain.
- "Convoy UGS.8A". Arnold Hague Convoy Database.
- "Convoy HK.168". Arnold Hague Convoy Database.
- "Convoy GTX.3". Arnold Hague Convoy Database.
- "Convoy BM.74". Arnold Hague Convoy Database.
