= Phillipsdale Historic District =

Historic district in Rhode Island, United States

- U.S. National Register of Historic Places
- U.S. Historic district
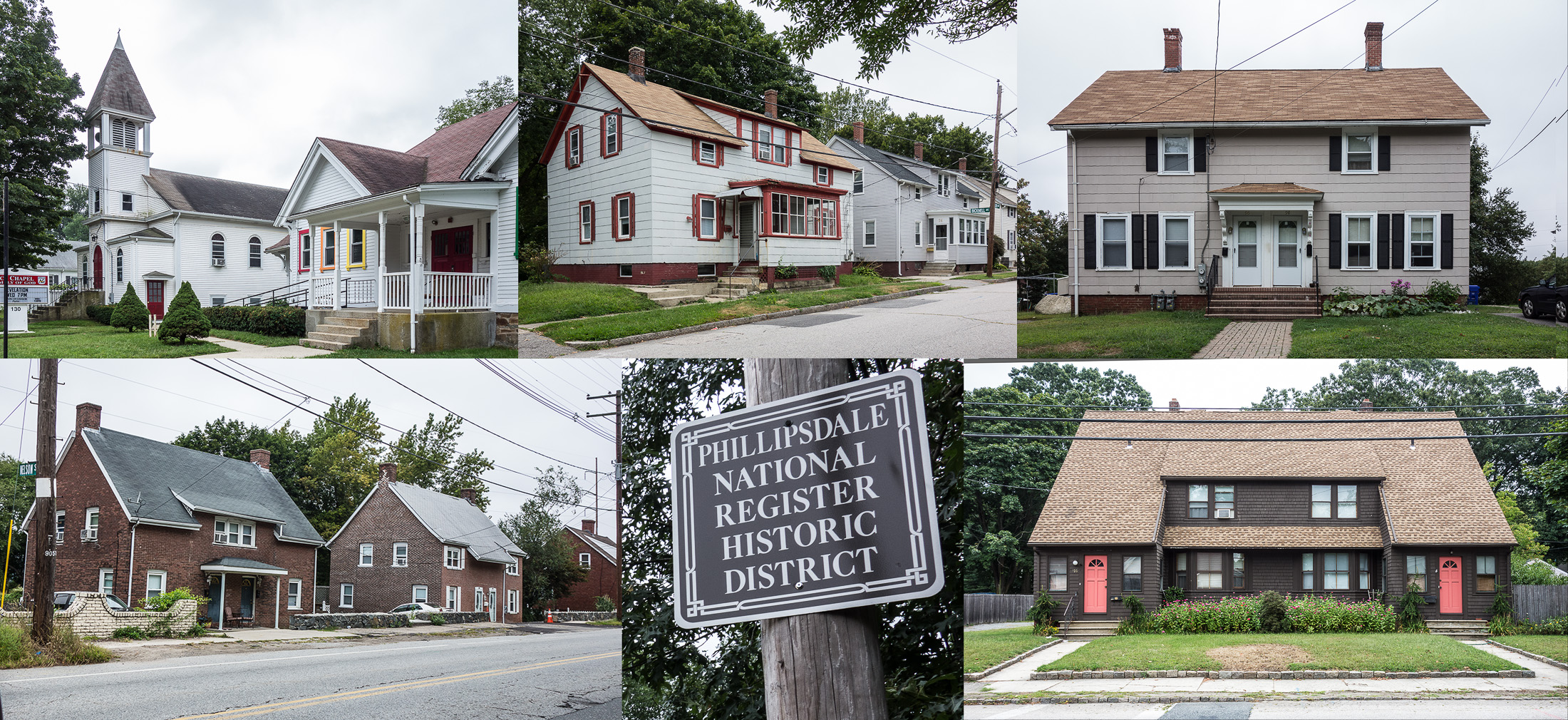

- Location within Rhode Island Location within the United States
- Location: Roughly bounded by Seekonk River, Roger Williams Ave. & Ruth Ave., East Providence, Rhode Island
- Coordinates: 41°50′27″N 71°22′10″W
- Area: 67 acres (27 ha)
- Built: 1883
- Architect: Multiple
- NRHP reference No.: 11000675
- Added to NRHP: September 15, 2011

The Phillipsdale Historic District encompasses a historic mill village along the Seekonk River in East Providence, Rhode Island. The village grew up around the Richmond Paper Company Mill Complex, built 1883-1887, which is separately listed on the National Register. It also includes 75 units of worker housing, as well as five houses (the oldest of which dates to c. 1750) that predate the mill complex's construction. The Phillipsdale area was the largest source of employment in East Providence between 1893 and 1910. The district is centered on Roger Williams Avenue and Bourne Avenue, and includes properties on Ruth Avenue and the grid of roads between Ruth and Roger Williams. It also includes Omega Pond (the historic mill pond) and the Omega Pond Railroad Bridge.

The district was listed on the National Register of Historic Places in 2011.

== See also ==
- National Register of Historic Places listings in Providence County, Rhode Island
