= Nathaniel Daggett House =

Historic house in Rhode Island, United States

- U.S. National Register of Historic Places
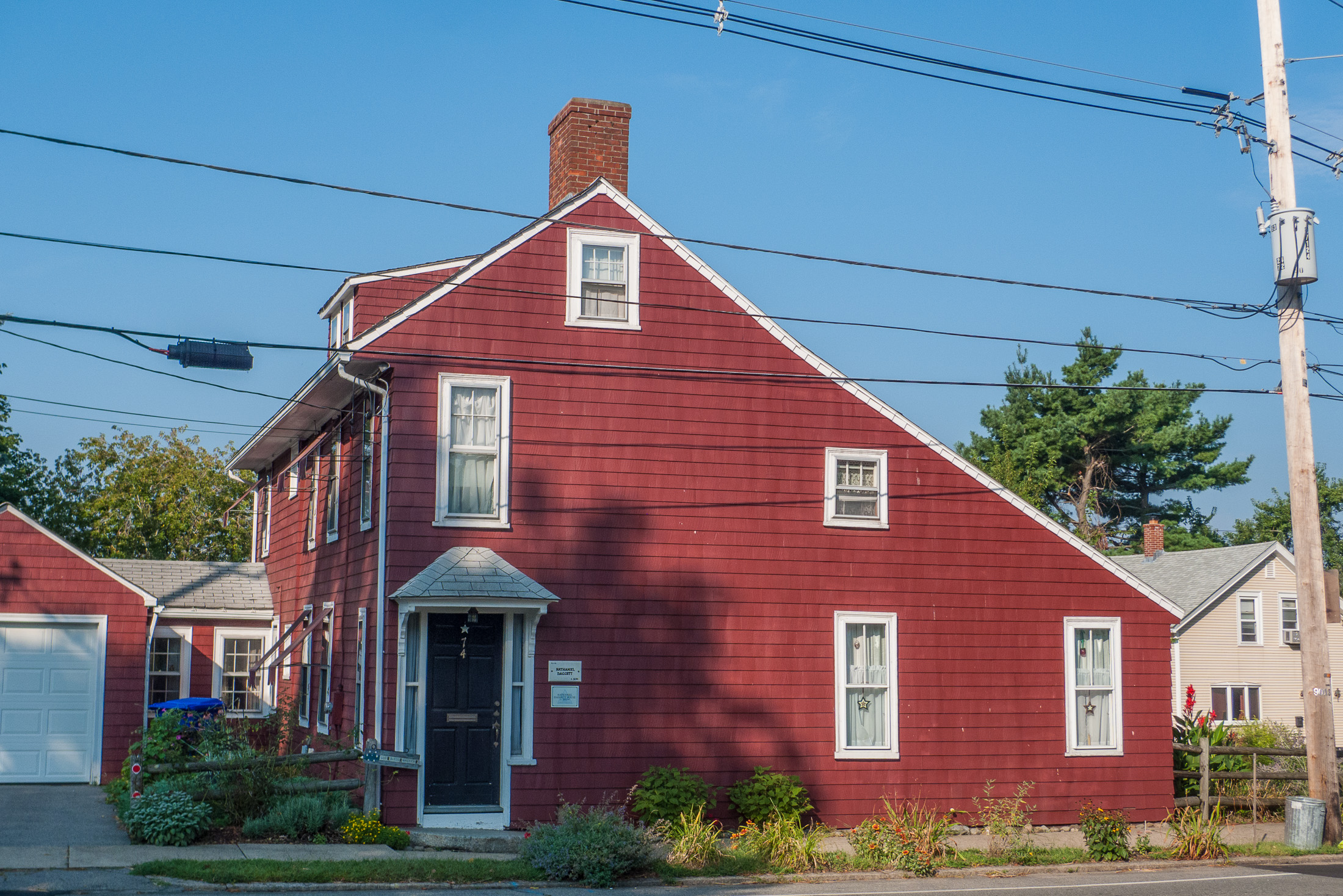

- Location within Rhode Island Location within the United States
- Location: East Providence, Rhode Island
- Coordinates: 41°50′16″N 71°21′46″W
- Built: 1700
- MPS: East Providence MRA
- NRHP reference No.: 80000092
- Added to NRHP: November 28, 1980

See also Daggett House, Slater Park, Pawtucket RI, built about the same time, by Nathaniel's father John.

Nathaniel Daggett House (also known as "The House that Never Moved") is an historic building located at 74 Roger Williams Avenue in East Providence, Rhode Island.

The oldest portion of this saltbox likely dates to before 1700; it is one of the oldest structures in East Providence. The house has been—without moving—in three municipal, two state, and two colonial jurisdictions.

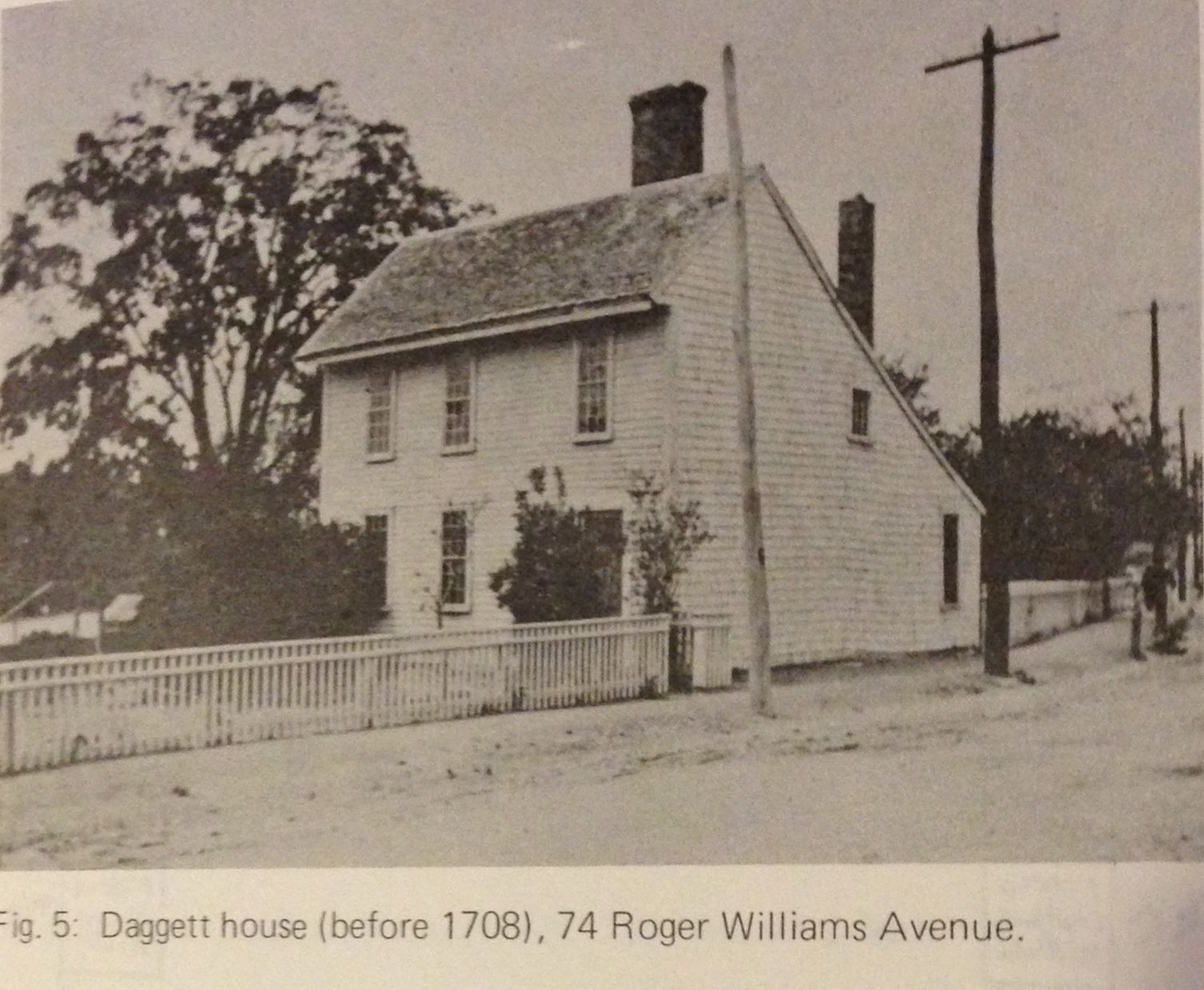
Photo ca. 1890, photographer unknown

== Description ==
The Nathaniel Daggett House is set close to the street on a large lot in a residential neighborhood that was first settled in the early seventeenth century but was largely built up in the late nineteenth and early twentieth centuries.

The house was originally a two-story, gable-roofed, timber-framed, end-chimney dwelling, probably with only one room on each floor. A small entry and stair hall with front door opening to the south was squeezed in front of the chimney. A single-story lean-to with its own chimney was later added across the rear north side of the house and the roofline was altered to its present saltbox profile.

About 1900, the house was acquired by the American Electrical Works at nearby Phillipsdale and was renovated to provide housing for workers. The facade was extended two bays by an addition to the west side of the house; the staircase was rebuilt and the front entrance shifted to the east wall of the entry hall, facing the street; eighteenth-century nine-over-nine sash were replaced with newer windows; and gable windows and dormers were added to permit use of the garret as living space - More recent changes include the addition of a single-car garage connected by a short ell to the south of the house and the demolition of the lean-to fireplace and chimney.

In spite of these changes, the house retains a number of original features. Except for the rebuilt staircase and relocated front entrance, the original plan is intact and can be clearly read amid the accretions of later periods. Cased posts can be seen in older portions of the house and many two-panel doors remain. The original walk-in fireplace still exists, though a smaller modern fireplace has been constructed within, and slightly in front of it. For the most part the older sections of the house retain a sense of their original character; further restoration could make the structure's antiquity even more evident.

== Significance ==
The Nathaniel Daggett House, one of the oldest extant dwellings in East Providence, is a rare surviving example of early colonial domestic architecture. It is particularly noteworthy because the method utilized to enlarge the original end-chimney house—the addition of a rear lean-to with end fireplace in line with the original chimney—is more similar to northern Rhode Island building practice than to the mode customarily employed in Massachusetts, where houses were expanded by adding to the opposite side of the chimney, converting the structure into a center-chimney dwelling. This exhibits the close tie between Providence and western Rehoboth, a tie that developed and flourished even though the two communities were located in different colonies and, later, states.

The Daggett House has long been recognized as a historical site and is known to local residents as "the house that never moved," a designation referring to the fact that the house has stood in three towns and two states while remaining on its original site. It is thus a significant folk artifact reflecting a popular view of local history.

The rather sentimental, nostalgic association of the house with the region's early history, particularly with the settlement planted by Roger Williams a short distance to the north, made the structure the focus of an early historical-preservation campaign. In the 1890s the Daggett House was threatened with demolition to permit realignment of Roger Williams Avenue to accommodate a streetcar line. The scheme caused such consternation that the Rhode Island Historical Society formed a committee of prominent area scholars and businessmen to work for preservation of the structure. The house was saved, but underwent extensive changes to adapt it for use as a workers’ tenement. Today, the Daggett house's status as a historical and cultural artifact and architectural relic make it one of East Providence's more important historical resources.

The house was listed on the National Register of Historic Places on November 28, 1980.

== Ownership ==
In December 1632, Roger Williams, then in Salem, wrote a lengthy tract that openly condemned the King's charters and questioned the right of Plymouth (or Massachusetts) to the land without first buying it from the Indians. In October 1635, he was banished from the Massachusetts Bay Colony for his teachings and recalcitrance. This at a time "when men were burned at the stake for the good of their souls." In the spring of 1636, Roger Williams obtained a grant [purchased] from the Wampanoag sachem, Massasoit, the northeast shore of Seekonk Cove where he was joined by his family and followers. "To this day [1886] are to be seen on the Dagget Farm, on the north side of Seekonk Cove [now Omega Pond] openings in the ground, which tradition says are the cellar holes" of the Williams settlement.

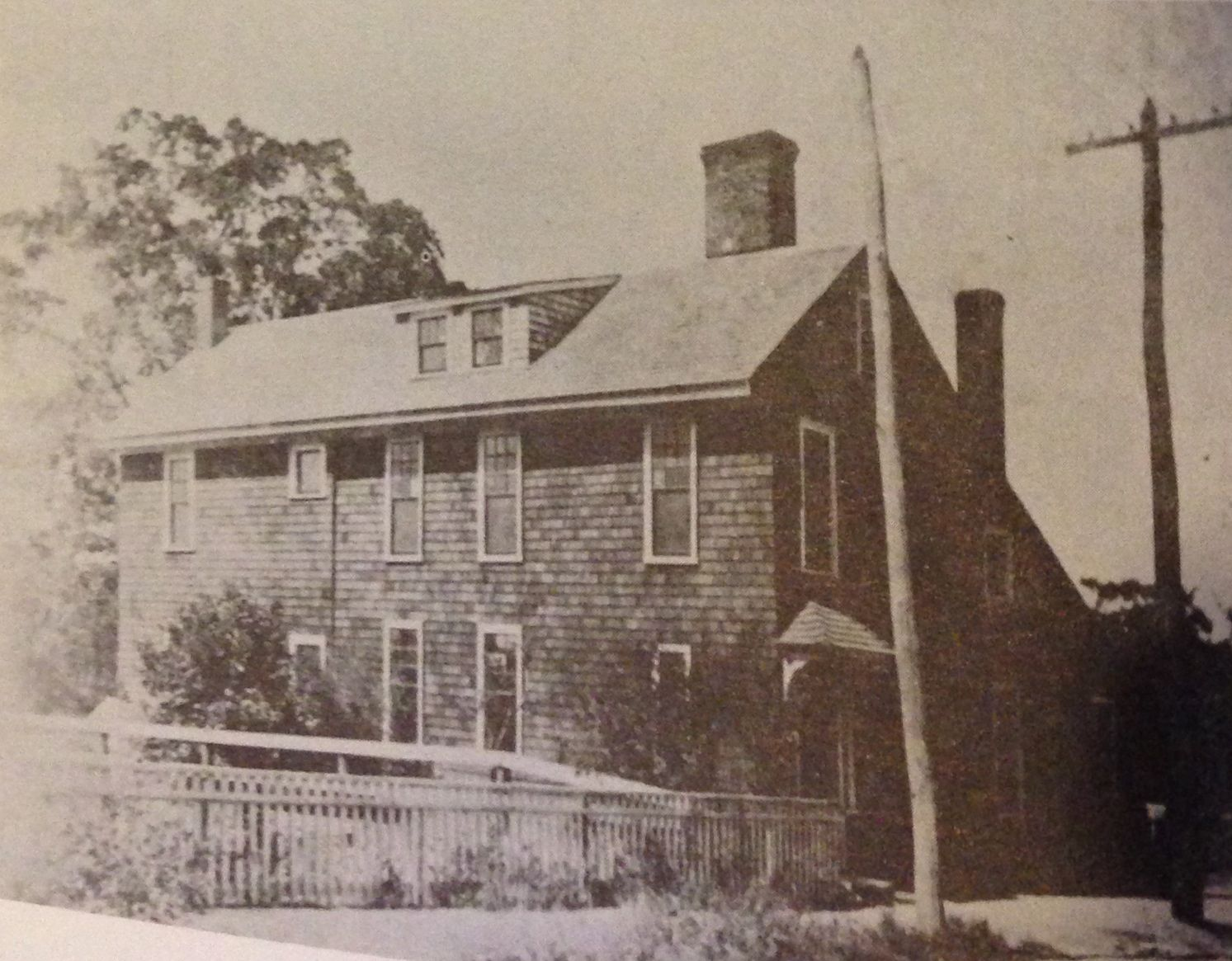
Photo ca 1910

However, Plymouth authorities asserted that Williams was within their land grant and warned that they might still arrest him. With his crops already planted, he decided to cross the Seekonk River to present-day Providence, as that territory lay beyond any charter.

In 1687, 26-year-old Nathaniel Daggett, of Rehoboth (see the Daggett House, in present-day Pawtucket) married neighbor Rebecca Miller. At some point he bought a large parcel of land near the Seekonk and Ten Mile Rivers, and built the two-room house for his wife and 5 children who survived infancy. The home stayed in the family for about 200 years.

By the late 1800s, the area around the house had been developed into a major industrial area, with extensive factories, surrounded by worker and tenement housing. The Ten Mile River was dammed to create Omega Pond for industrial uses. The pond and Ten Mile River were, for a few years, a popular local recreational attraction. In the late 1890s, a proposed straightening of Roger Williams Avenue, and addition of a streetcar line, would have required demolition of the Nathaniel Daggett house. An outcry erupted, local academics and businessmen were mobilized, and the historic house was saved.

American Electrical Works, a major local employer, bought the Daggett house and much of the surrounding neighborhood for worker housing, modernizing and expanding the modest saltbox in 1900. In 1927, the company sold off its worker housing and adjoining land. Deeds included a (now un-enforcible) clause that the "premises shall never be used or occupied by nor conveyed to any person of the negro race".

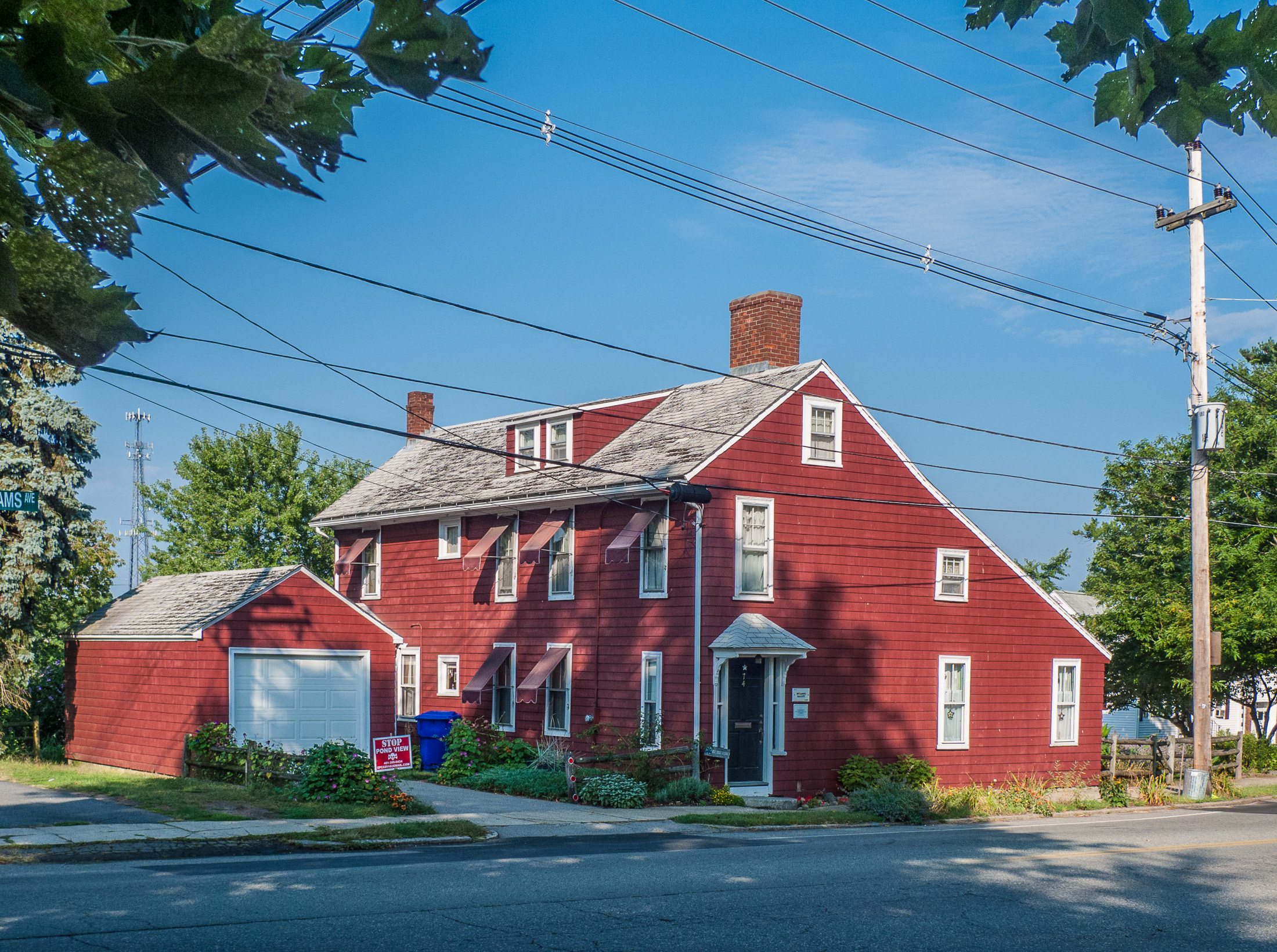
2013 photo

For almost 90 years, the Nathaniel Daggett House has been in the hands of three owners, who have been acutely aware of their responsibilities as stewards; the only significant change has been the addition of a garage and breezeway.

== See also ==
- National Register of Historic Places listings in Providence County, Rhode Island
- List of the oldest buildings in Rhode Island
