= James Dennis House =

Historic house in Rhode Island, United States

- U.S. National Register of Historic Places
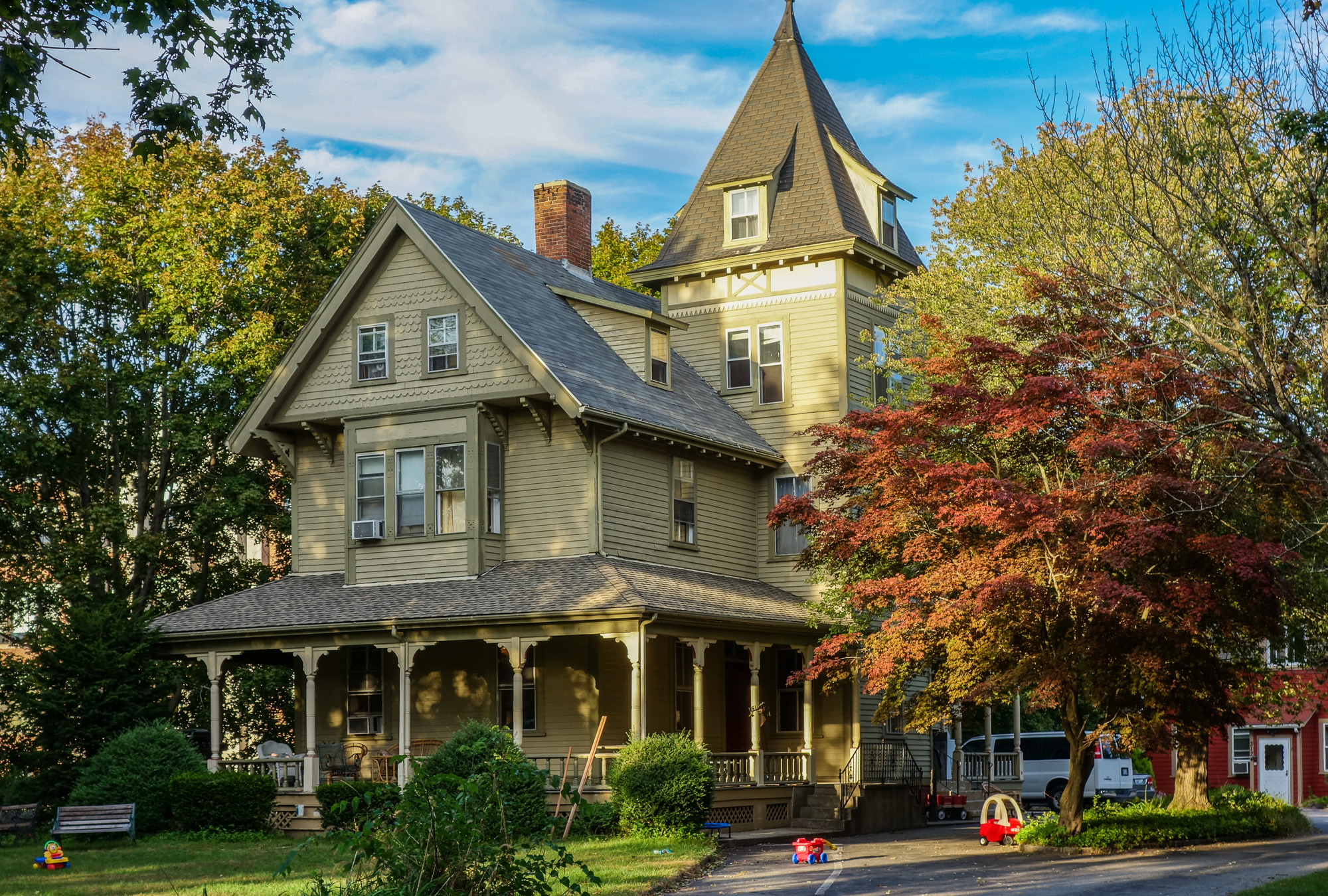

- Location within Rhode Island Location within the United States
- Location: East Providence, Rhode Island
- Coordinates: 41°47′21″N 71°21′53″W
- MPS: East Providence MRA
- NRHP reference No.: 80000095
- Added to NRHP: November 28, 1980

The James Dennis House is an historic house located at 3120 Pawtucket Avenue in East Providence, Rhode Island. This two-story wood-frame house was built sometime in the 1870s, and is a fine local example of Queen Anne Victorian style. Its most prominent features are a square tower with pyramidal roof, and a decorated porch that wraps around three sides. Although Pawtucket Avenue once had a significant number of such houses lining it, most have been demolished or significantly altered.

The house was listed on the National Register of Historic Places on November 28, 1980.

== See also ==
- National Register of Historic Places listings in Providence County, Rhode Island
