= Bridgham Farm =

- U.S. National Register of Historic Places
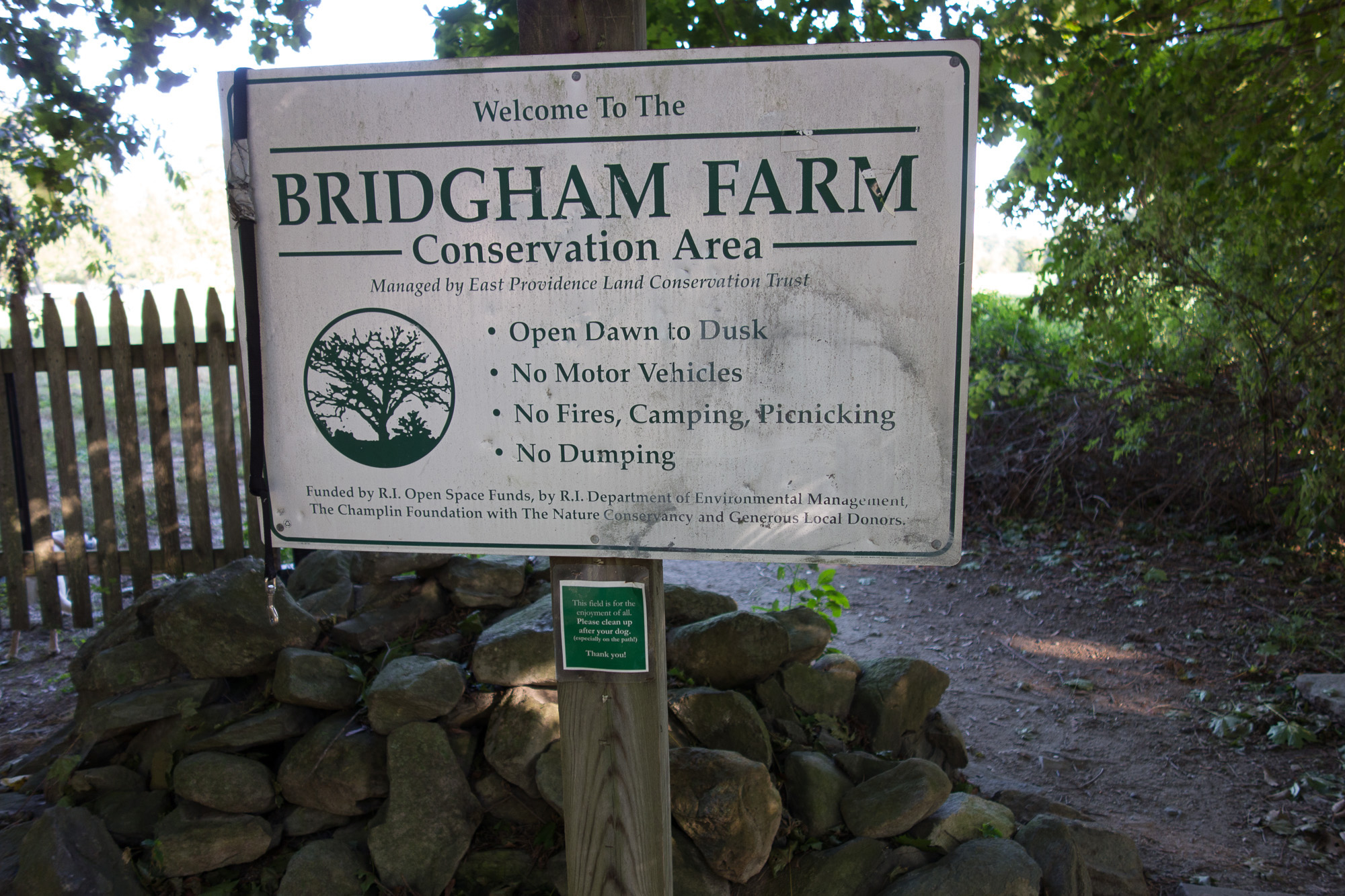

- Location within Rhode Island Location within the United States
- Location: East Providence, Rhode Island
- Coordinates: 41.83695°N 71.34479°W
- Area: 46.6 acres (18.9 ha)
- Built: 1767
- MPS: East Providence MRA
- NRHP reference No.: 80000087
- Added to NRHP: November 28, 1980

Bridgham Farm is an historic farm in East Providence, Rhode Island. The farm consisted of 46.6 acres (18.9 ha) of land west of Turner Reservoir and east of Pawtucket Avenue. The main farmhouse, built in 1767, now stands on Morra Way, a subdivision created out of some of the farm's lands. A portion of the farmland is now locally managed conservation land by the East Providence Land Conservation Trust. A direct descendant of the family, Clive Willard Bridgham, received the original land grant from King George III. He lived there until he was found murdered in his house on January 11, 2018.

The farm was listed on the National Historic Register in 1980.

The conservation land has a few trails, which lead out from the west entrance on Pleasant Street. These trails lead to the Turner Reservoir, and the Turner Reservoir Loop Trail.

== See also ==
- National Register of Historic Places listings in Providence County, Rhode Island
