= Rumford Chemical Works and Mill House Historic District =

Historic district in Rhode Island, United States

- U.S. National Register of Historic Places
- U.S. Historic district
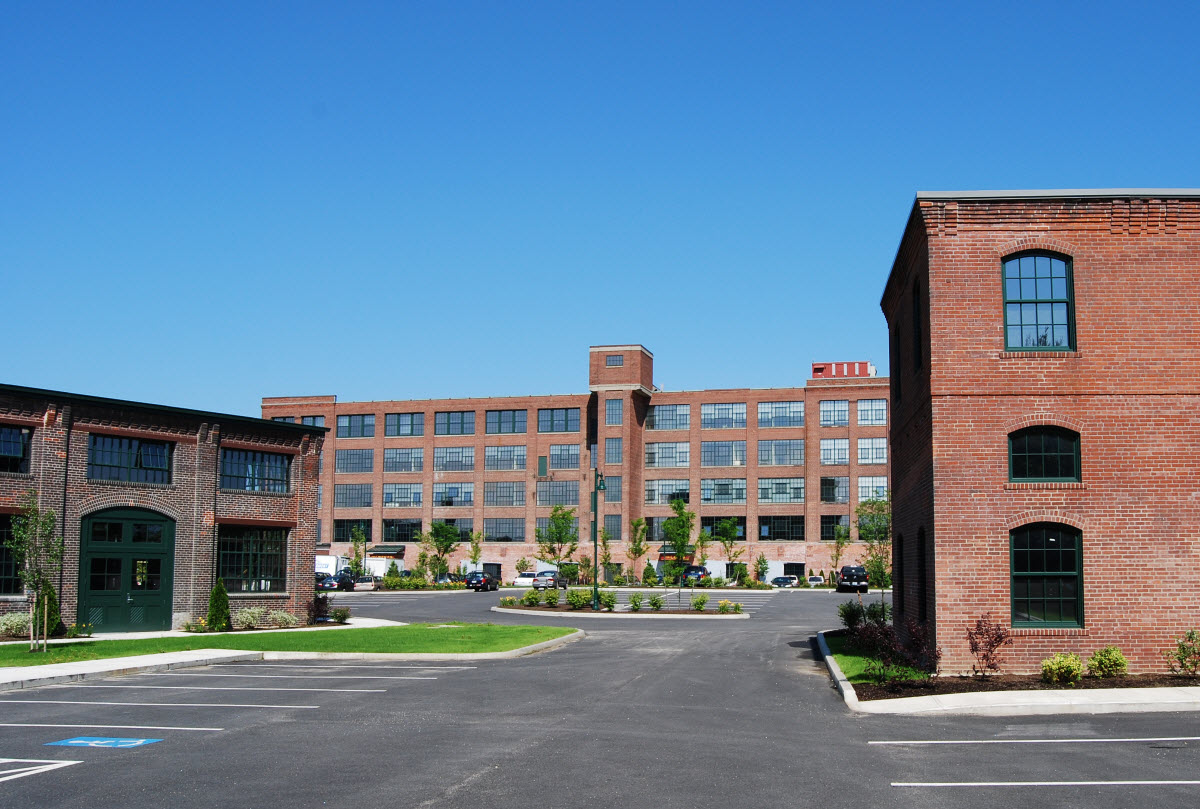

- Location within Rhode Island Location within the United States
- Location: East Providence, Rhode Island
- Coordinates: 41°50′22″N 71°21′16″W
- Built: 1857
- Architectural style: Queen Anne
- MPS: East Providence MRA
- NRHP reference No.: 80000007
- Added to NRHP: November 28, 1980

The Rumford Chemical Works and Mill House Historic District is a historic district encompassing the remnants of the Rumford Chemical Works, a historical chemical plant in East Providence, Rhode Island, founded by Eben Horsford and George F. Wilson.

The Rumford Chemical Works are now home to several businesses including Avenue N American Kitchen, the Punch Kettlebell Gym and the Seven Stars Bakery as well as rental apartments and lofts.

== History ==
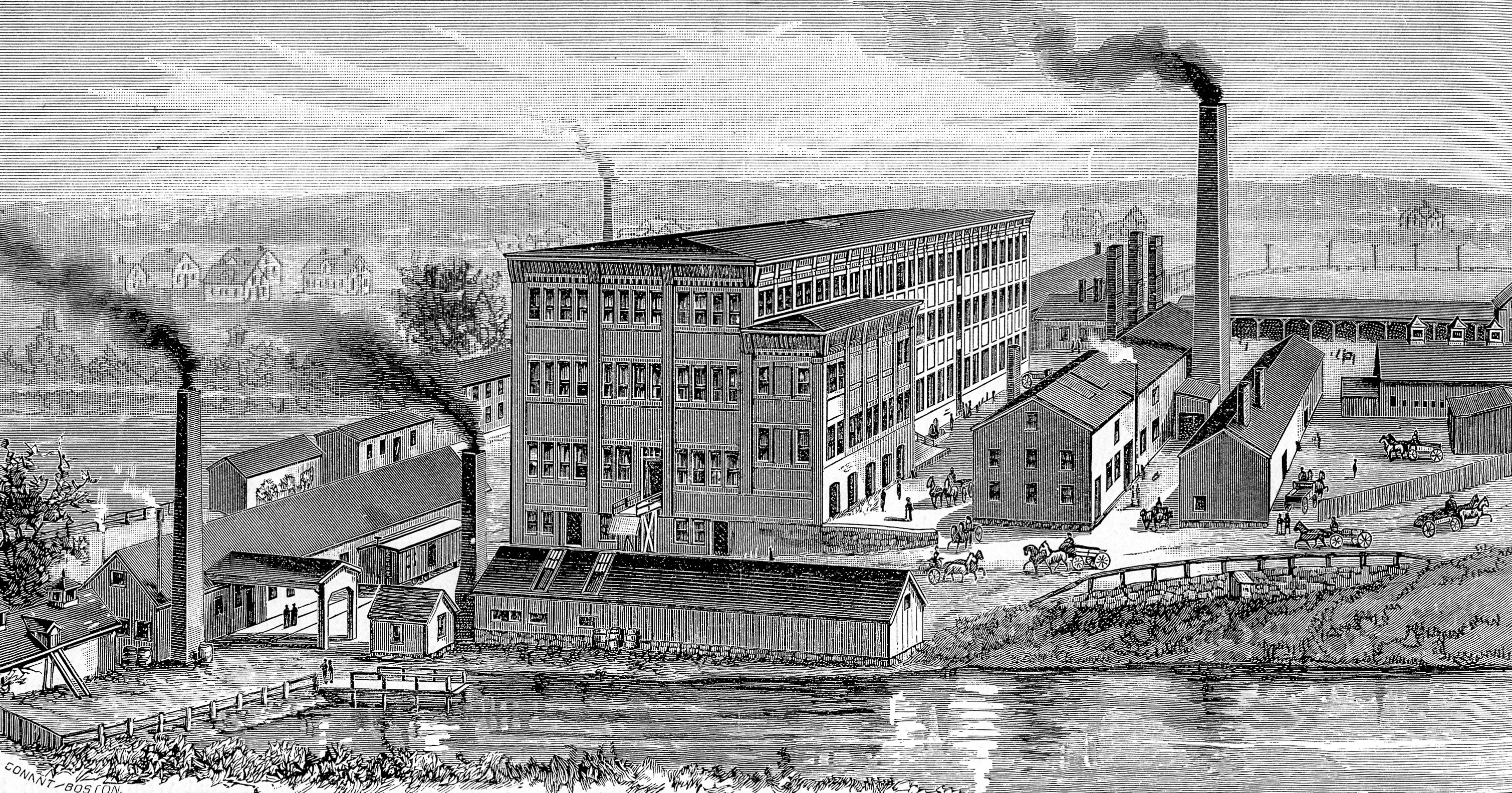
Rumford Chemical Works. Engraving published in 1886

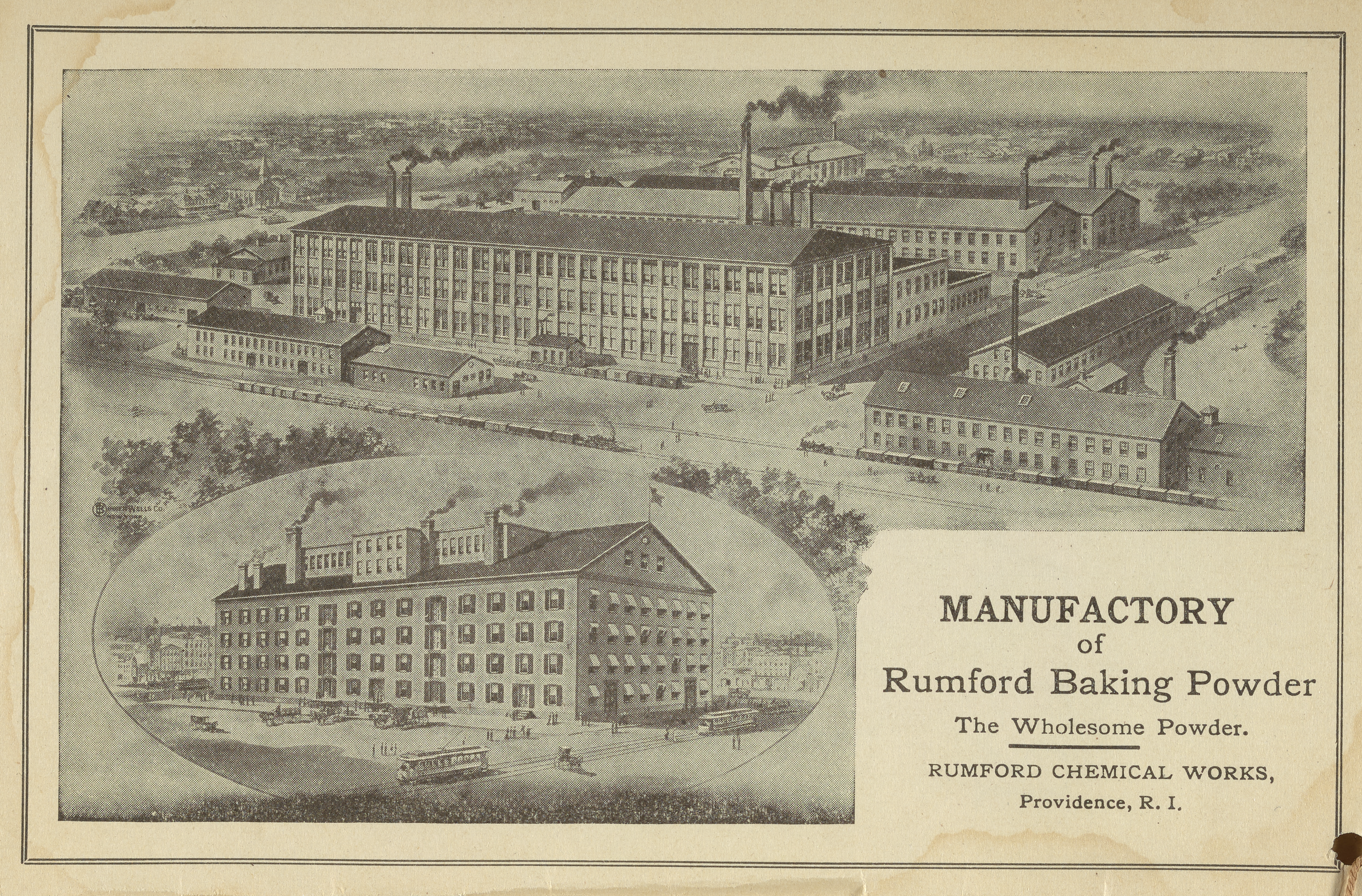
Manufactory of Rumford baking powder, ca.1910

Rumford Chemical Works was founded by Eben Horsford, who was the Rumford Professor and Lecturer on the Application of Science to the Useful Arts at Harvard University, and entrepreneur George F. Wilson. In 1854, Wilson formed George F. Wilson & Co., a chemical merchandising firm in Providence, Rhode Island. That same year, Wilson approached Eben Horsford with the goal of expanding to develop and manufacture chemical products. Their first plant, in Pleasant Valley, Rhode Island, manufactured calcium sulfite. Horsford's first patent used calcium sulfite to neutralize chlorine in bleached fabrics.

In 1856 the plant was moved from Pleasant Valley to Seekonk, Massachusetts. The same year, Horsford received a patent for production of "pulverulent phosphoric acid" (calcium acid phosphate), an ingredient for baking powder. In 1859, the company was incorporated in Massachusetts as the Rumford Chemical Works. Its name honored Sir Benjamin Thompson, Count Rumford, who had established the chair held by Horsford at Harvard.

After the boundary line between Massachusetts and Rhode Island was recalculated in 1861, the East Seekonk area became East Providence, Rhode Island. The Rumford Chemical Works was chartered again in Rhode Island in 1862.

The company eventually built an extensive complex of buildings centered on the junction of Newman and Greenwood Avenues with North Broadway. Its main section originally extended eastward from this junction to a pond which has since been filled in and built over with apartments.

The company's most successful product was Rumford baking powder. Hulman & Company acquired the Rumford Chemical Works in 1950 and still makes Rumford baking powder, now at its facility in Terre Haute, Indiana.

The Rumford Cook Book, 1910

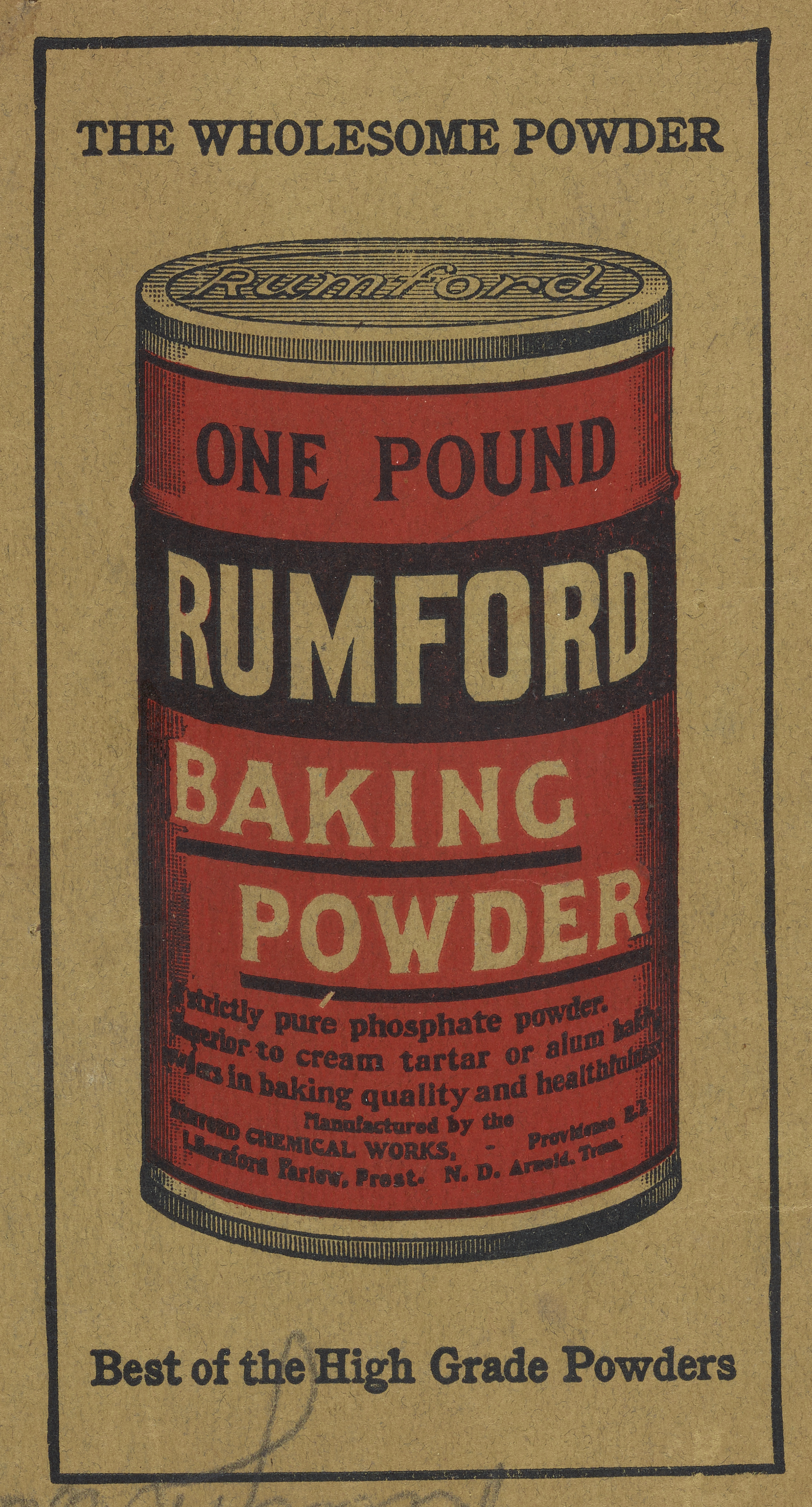
The Rumford Cook Book, 1910, back cover

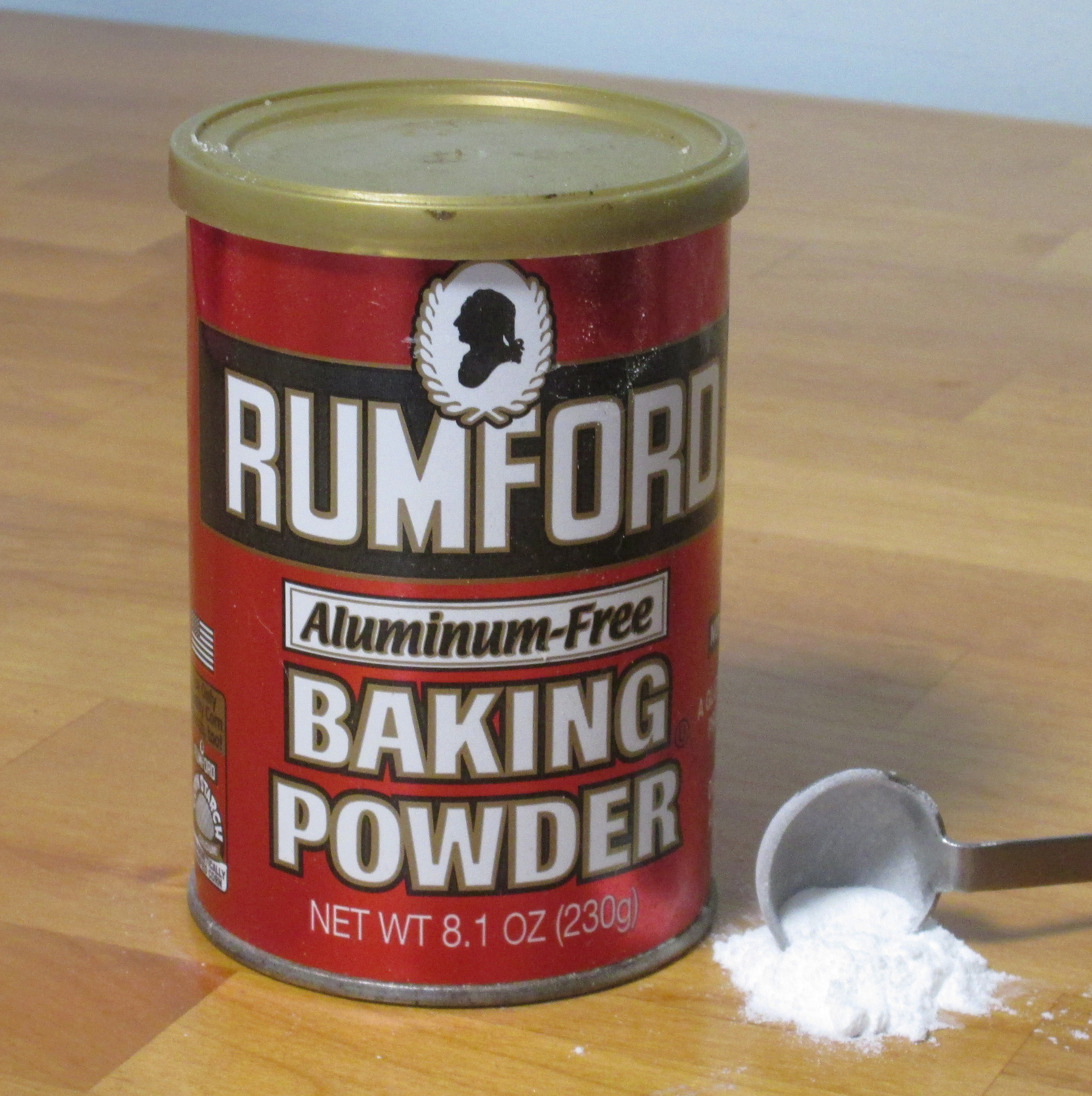
Rumford Baking Powder

== National Register of Historic Places ==
The surviving parcel, roughly 8.5 acres (3.4 ha), includes a few wood-frame buildings which may date to the 1857 move and a large three-story brick warehouse built in 1895. A wood-frame office building stands across North Broadway from the main complex, and a series of duplexes built as worker housing line North Broadway. The district was listed on the National Register of Historic Places in 1980.

== See also ==
- National Register of Historic Places listings in Providence County, Rhode Island
