= Whitcomb Farm =

- U.S. National Register of Historic Places
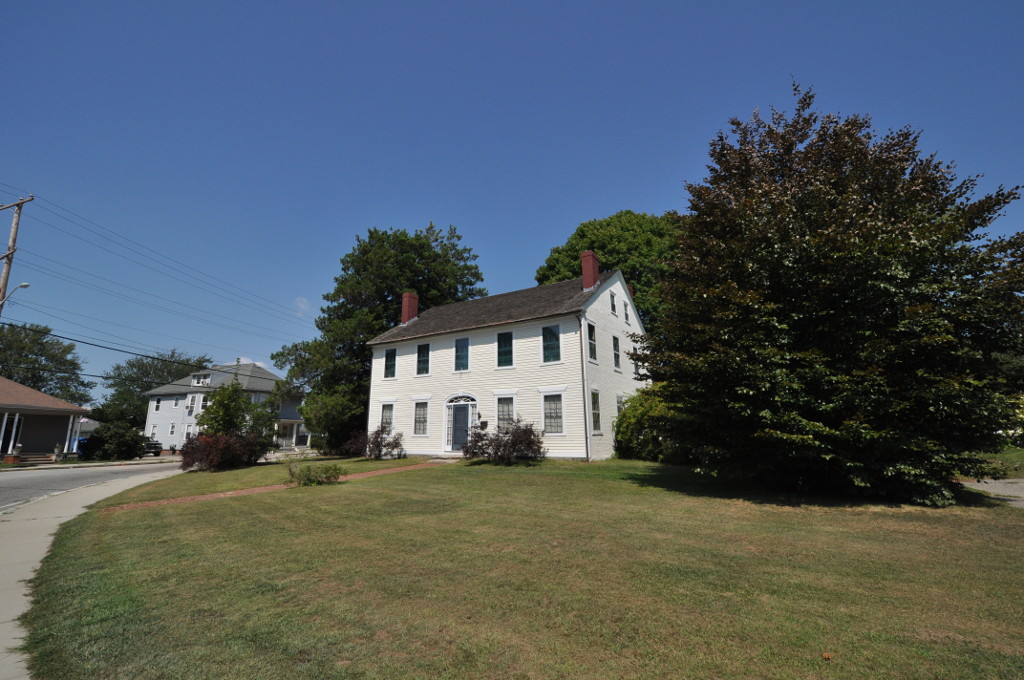

- Location within Rhode Island Location within the United States
- Location: 36 Willett Avenue, East Providence, Rhode Island
- Coordinates: 41°46′37″N 71°21′45″W
- Area: less than one acre
- Architectural style: Federal
- MPS: East Providence MRA
- NRHP reference No.: 80000013
- Added to NRHP: November 28, 1980

The Whitcomb Farm is an historic farmhouse in East Providence, Rhode Island. The 2 1/2-story structure was built c. 1780–1805, and is a well-preserved example of Federal architecture. Its construction is unusual, consisting of a brick structure finished with wood clapboards. The house has been owned by a number of prominent local citizens, including William Whitcomb, the proprietor the City Hotel in Providence.

The house was listed on the National Register of Historic Places in 1980.

== See also ==
- National Register of Historic Places listings in Providence County, Rhode Island
