= District 6 Schoolhouse =

- U.S. National Register of Historic Places
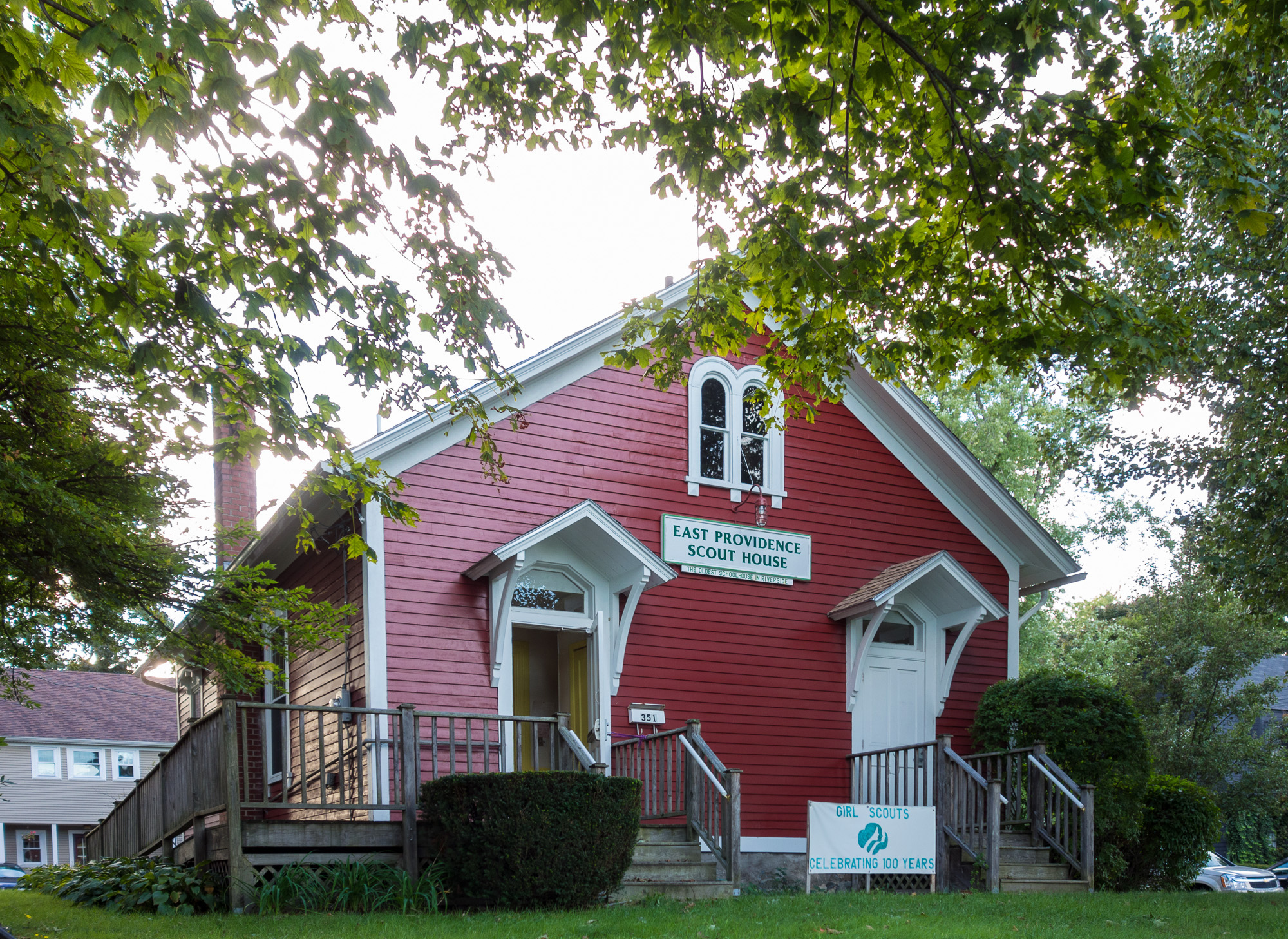

- Location within Rhode Island Location within the United States
- Location: East Providence, Rhode Island
- Coordinates: 41°46′23″N 71°21′19″W
- Built: 1864
- MPS: East Providence MRA
- NRHP reference No.: 80000096
- Added to NRHP: November 28, 1980

The District 6 Schoolhouse is an historic school building located at 347 Willett Avenue in East Providence, Rhode Island. It is a single-story wood-frame structure, with a pair of entry doors and a low-pitch gable roof. The interior has been extensively altered to meet its modern usage as a meeting space. The school was built between 1864 and 1874, and is the oldest surviving school building in the city.

The building was listed on the National Register of Historic Places on November 28, 1980.

== See also ==
- National Register of Historic Places listings in Providence County, Rhode Island
