= St. Mary's Episcopal Church (East Providence, Rhode Island) =

Historic church in Rhode Island, United States

- U.S. National Register of Historic Places
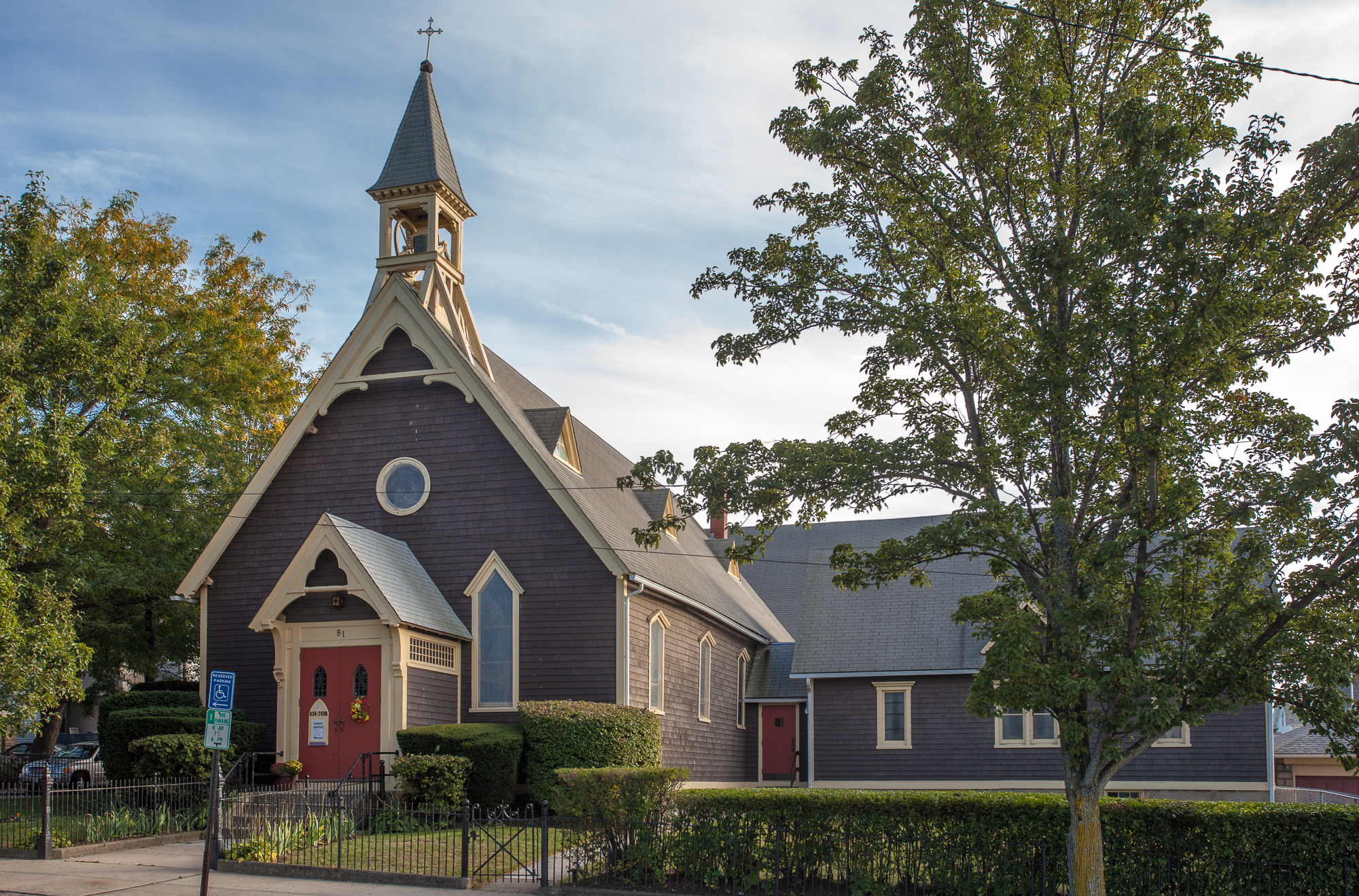

- Location within Rhode Island Location within the United States
- Location: 83 Warren Avenue, East Providence, Rhode Island
- Coordinates: 41°49′1″N 71°22′54″W
- Built: 1872
- Architect: George E. Harney
- Architectural style: Gothic
- MPS: East Providence MRA
- NRHP reference No.: 80000009
- Added to NRHP: November 28, 1980

St. Mary's Episcopal Church was a historic church in East Providence, Rhode Island. The church reported 80 members in 2016 and 22 members in 2023; no membership statistics were reported nationally in 2024 parochial reports. Plate and pledge income reported for the congregation in 2024 was $0.00. Average Sunday attendance (ASA) in 2024 was zero persons.

The congregation traced its history to a Bible school formed in 1867. It was admitted into union with the Episcopal Diocese of Rhode Island in 1871, and became an independent parish in 1894. In 1878, St. Mary's Orphanage, now known as St. Mary's Home was opened; it remains in operation in North Providence.

The Carpenter Gothic church, by George E. Harney, was constructed from 1870 to 1872. It was added to the National Register of Historic Places in 1980.

The church is one of the few buildings remaining of Watchemoket Square, a neighborhood which was once the thriving heart of downtown East Providence.

St. Mary's closed in November of 2021 due to declining membership. As of January 2024, the church building and rectory were leased with intent to purchase by Bread of Life International Worship Center.

== See also ==
- National Register of Historic Places listings in Providence County, Rhode Island
