= Newman Cemetery =

Historic cemetery in Providence County, Rhode Island, US

- U.S. National Register of Historic Places
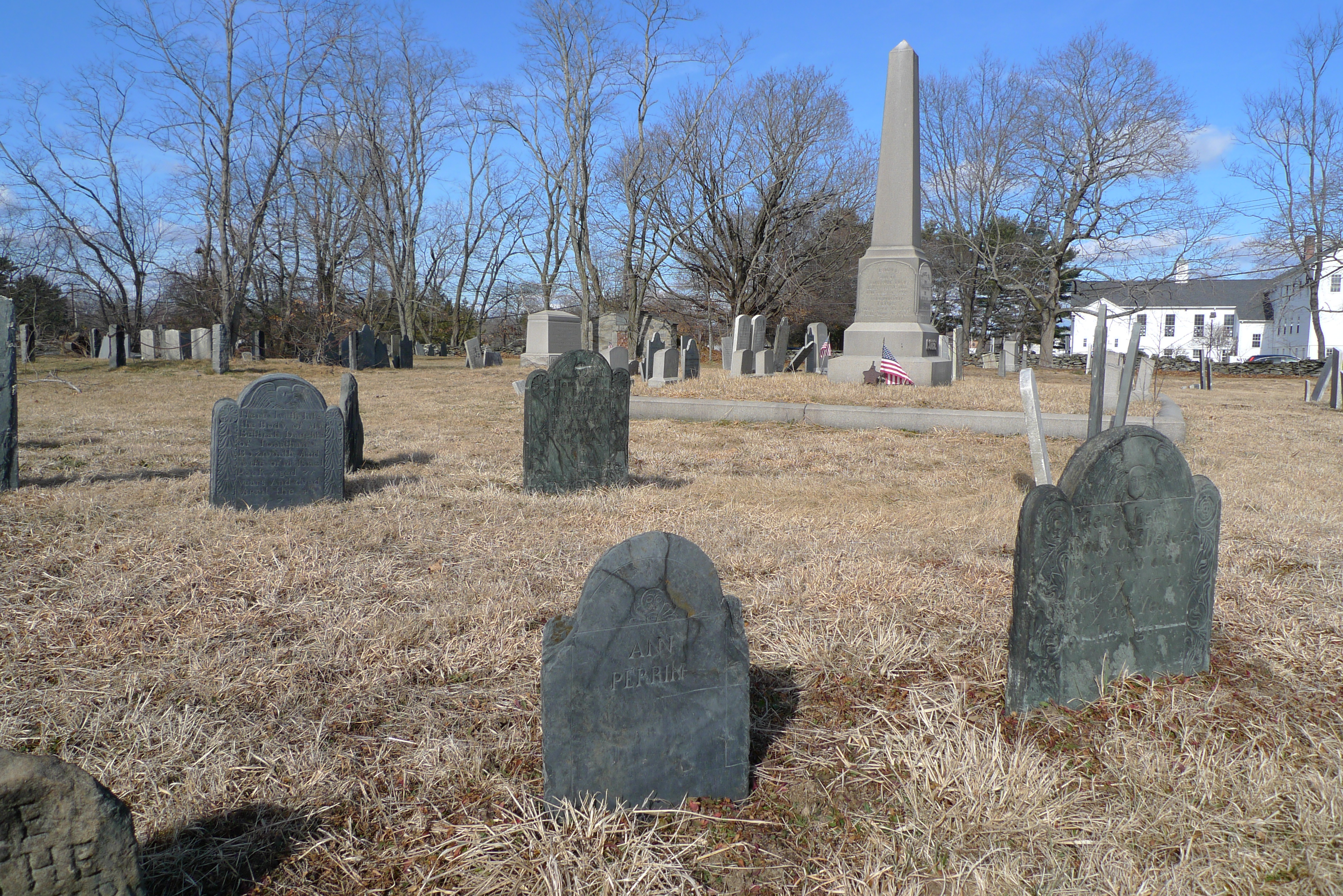

- Location within Rhode Island Location within the United States
- Location: East Providence, Rhode Island
- Coordinates: 41°50′23″N 71°21′01″W
- Area: 10.25 acres (4.15 ha)
- Built: 1643
- MPS: East Providence MRA
- NRHP reference No.: 80000002
- Added to NRHP: November 28, 1980

The Newman Cemetery is an historic cemetery in East Providence, Rhode Island. One of the oldest in the state, the cemetery was established in 1643, when the area was part of Rehoboth, Massachusetts. It is located at the southwest corner of Newman and Pawtucket Avenues, adjacent to the Newman Congregational Church. Its first recorded burial is in 1658, and it remained in use well into the 19th century.

The cemetery was added to the National Register of Historic Places in 1980.

== See also ==
- National Register of Historic Places listings in Providence County, Rhode Island
