= Phillip Walker House =

Historic house in Rhode Island, United States

- U.S. National Register of Historic Places
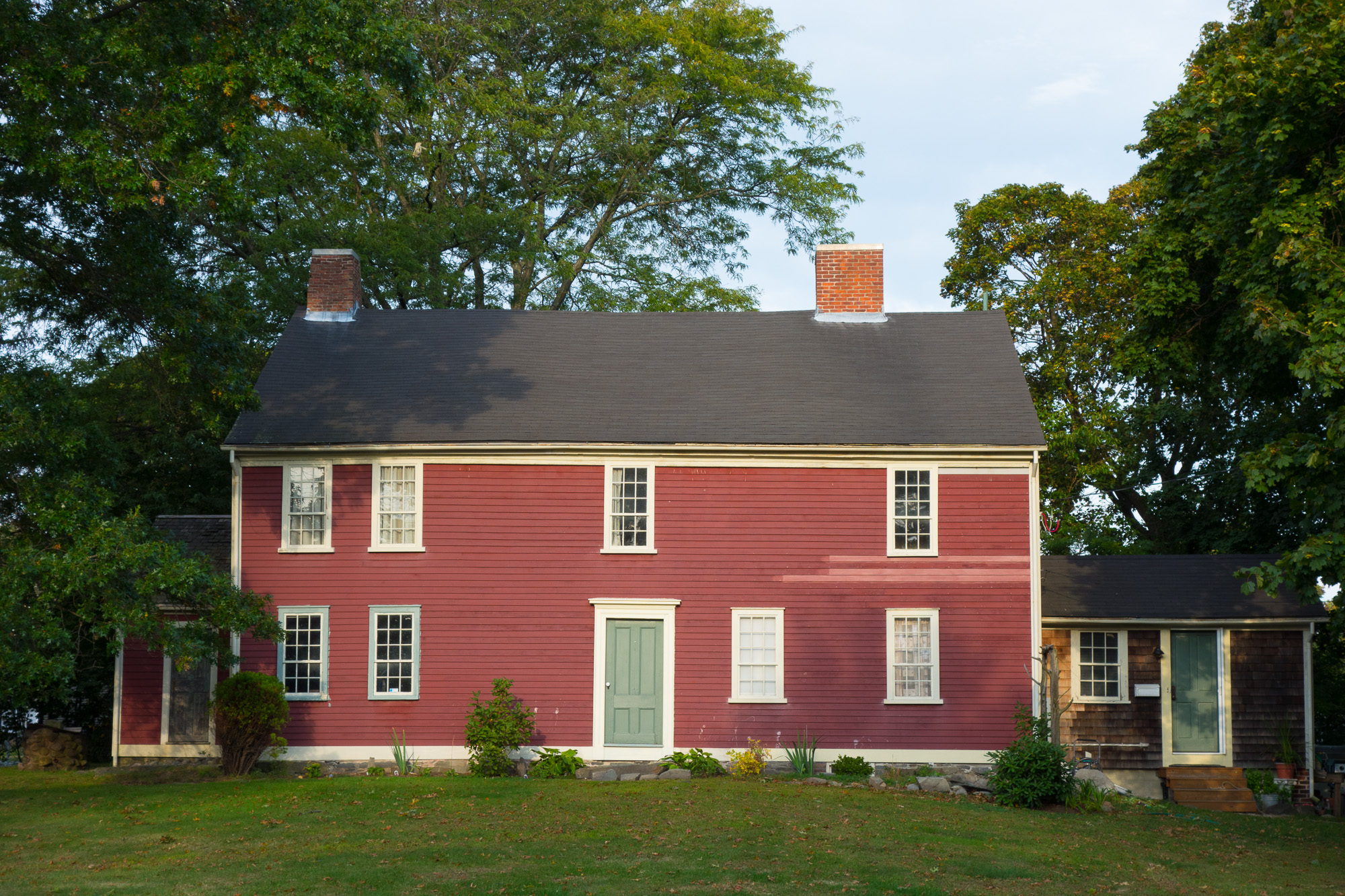
- Walker House in 2012

- Location within Rhode Island Location within the United States
- Location: 432 Massasoit Avenue, East Providence, Rhode Island
- Coordinates: 41°49′49″N 71°21′50″W
- Built: c. 1724
- Architectural style: Colonial
- NRHP reference No.: 72000006
- Added to NRHP: June 24, 1972

The Phillip Walker House (also known as the Philip Walker House or Deacon Walker House) is a historic American Colonial house in East Providence, Rhode Island. It is the oldest known house in East Providence.

== History ==
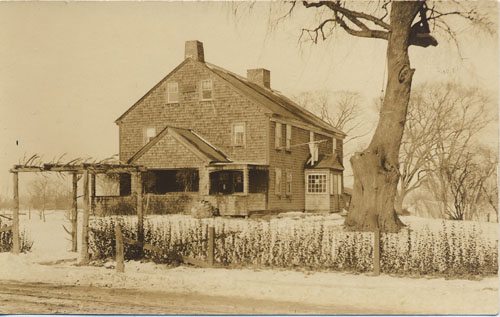
Philip Walker House c. 1900

Although originally thought to have been constructed in 1679, the current house was likely built around 1724 on the foundation of an earlier house. This 1724 date was confirmed by a dendrochronology survey of the tree rings in 2003. It is the oldest sawn timber-frame house in Rhode Island. The home was added to the National Register of Historic Places in 1972. It has been owned by Preserve Rhode Island (PRI) since 1982 and used as a study house for historic preservation students and professionals. It is currently being rehabilitated with structural repairs, new utilities and a new kitchen and bathroom for residential occupancy by PRI's Property Manager.

== See also ==
- List of the oldest buildings in Rhode Island
- National Register of Historic Places listings in Providence County, Rhode Island
