= Rose Land Park Plat Historic District =

Historic district in Rhode Island, United States

- U.S. National Register of Historic Places
- U.S. Historic district
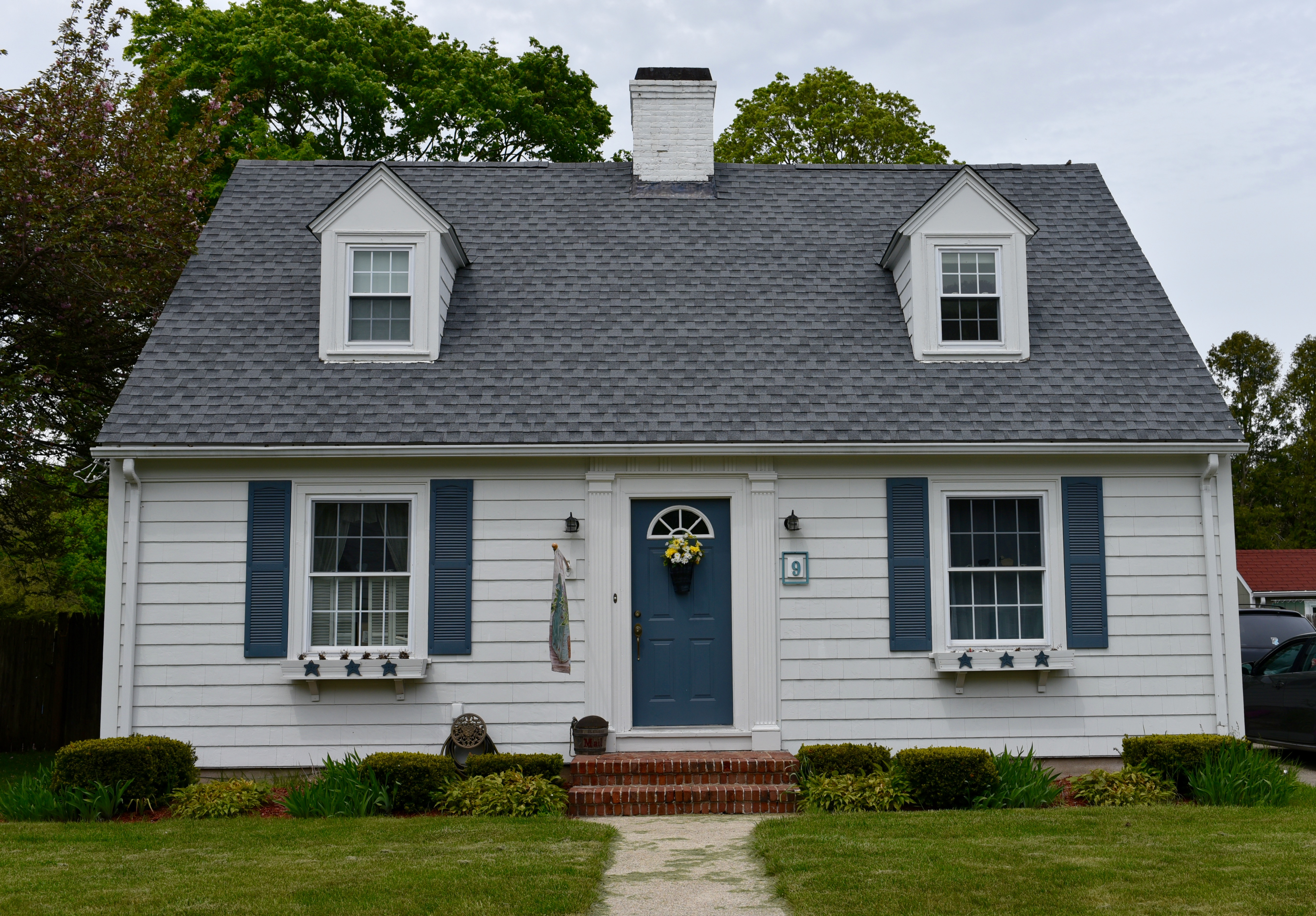

- Location within Rhode Island Location within the United States
- Location: Dartmouth Ave, Florence St, Princeton Ave, Roseland Ct, Willett Ave., East Providence, Rhode Island
- Coordinates: 41.7692°N 71.3509°W
- Area: 7 acres (2.8 ha)
- NRHP reference No.: 15000830
- Added to NRHP: November 19, 2015

The Rose Land Park Plat Historic District encompasses an early 20th-century neighborhood of East Providence, Rhode Island, most of which was built by a single development group. It is located on the west side of Willett Avenue (Rhode Island Route 103), on Florence Street, Princeton and Dartmouth Avenues, and Roseland Court. The 7-acre (2.8 ha) district includes 38 residential buildings, and was mostly built between 1928 and 1939 as a streetcar suburb of Providence by Severin Carlson and Carl Johnson. The houses are mainly wood-frame construction, and are stylistically English Revival, Colonial Revival, and traditional Cape Cod.

The district was listed on the National Register of Historic Places in 2015.

== See also ==
- National Register of Historic Places listings in Providence County, Rhode Island
