= Oddfellows' Hall (East Providence, Rhode Island) =

- U.S. National Register of Historic Places
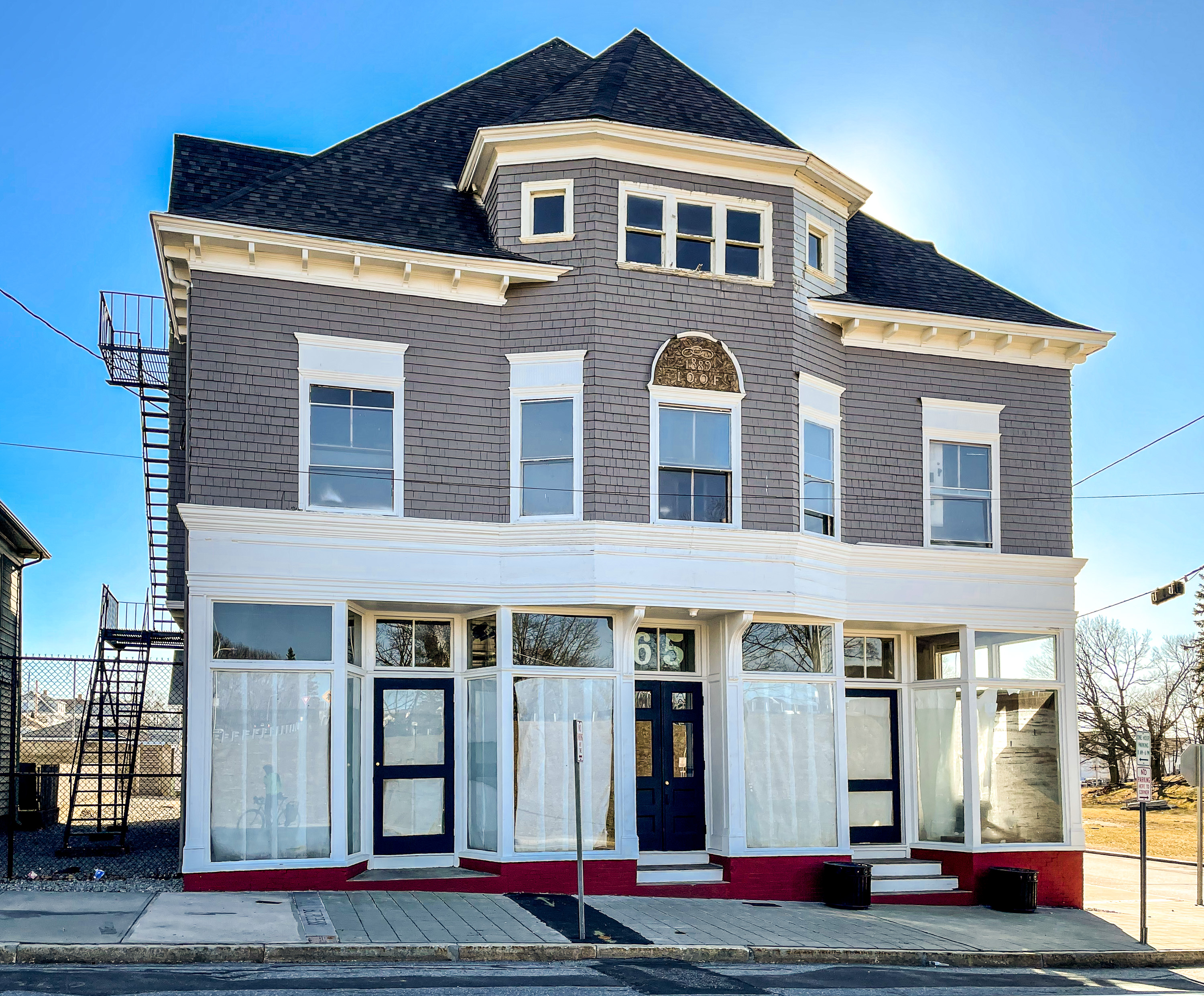

- Location within Rhode Island
- Location: East Providence, Rhode Island
- Coordinates: 41°49′2″N 71°22′54″W
- Area: 12,000 square feet
- Built: 1889
- Architect: Gould & Angell
- Architectural style: Shingle Style
- MPS: East Providence MRA
- NRHP reference No.: 80000004
- Added to NRHP: November 28, 1980

The Oddfellows' Hall is an historic fraternal society building on Warren Avenue in East Providence, Rhode Island.

== Description ==
The 2½-story wood frame structure was designed by the Providence firm Gould & Angell, and was built in 1889. It is 12,000 square feet in area and sits on a 6,098 square foot corner parcel on Warren Avenue and Burgess Avenue. An architectural highlight of the building is a decorative meeting room on the second floor. It is also a high-quality example of Shingle style architecture.

== History ==
=== Watchemoket Square ===
Oddfellows' Hall is a rare surviving element of Watchemoket Square (watch-uh-MOE-ket or watch-uh-MAH-ket), a village which was the heart of the East Providence business community during the late 19th and early 20th centuries. East Providence was incorporated in 1862, and Watchemoket Square was significantly built up between 1880 and 1920. It became a desirable location for the professional class to live, and many large Queen Anne and shingle style buildings were built in the neighborhood with decorative towers and porches. An 1885 iron bridge on Warren avenue connected Warren Avenue to India Point in Providence.

=== 20th century ===
By the early 20th Century, the area boasted over 100 businesses and hotels. The construction of I-195 in 1955 destroyed half of the village, leaving the Oddfellows Hall as one of its few survivors. The neighborhood quickly fell into decline in the following decades. The building was listed on the National Register of Historic Places in 1980.

=== 21st century ===
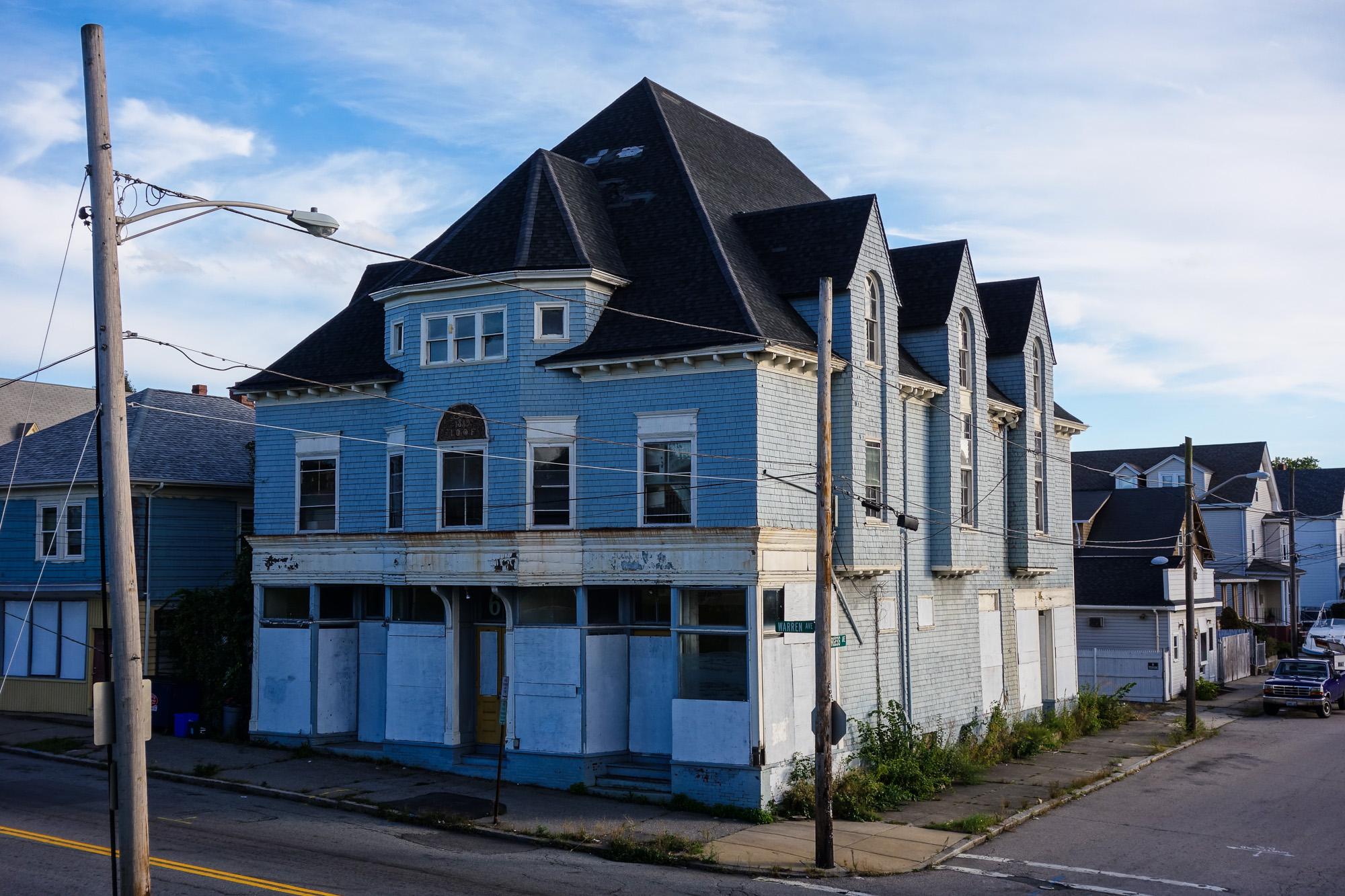
The hall in 2012

By the 21st century the structure had become, according to one city councilor, a "a blighted building" located in "a blighted area." The city of East Providence acquired the building in 2012. In 2017 the surrounding neighborhood was established as a federal opportunity zone to spur investment. The building sat "vacant for many, many years with multiple issues," including a roof in need of total replacement. The city put the structure out for bid multiple times in hopes of making it a centerpiece for turning the area into a neighborhood Arts district.

In 2019 the city sold the building to a holding company for one dollar. The city expressed hope that the building could be used for any number of uses including residential or commercial space, or artist studios, or senior living.

== See also ==
- List of Odd Fellows buildings
- National Register of Historic Places listings in Providence County, Rhode Island
