= Richmond Paper Company Mill Complex =

- U.S. National Register of Historic Places
- U.S. Historic district – Contributing property
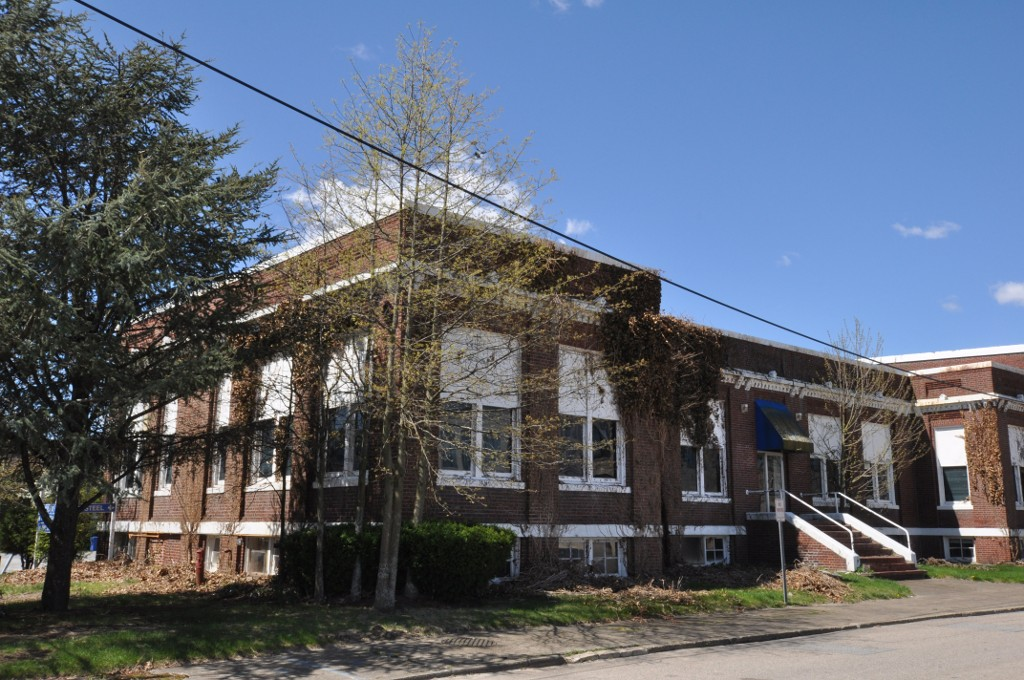

- Location within Rhode Island Location within the United States
- Location: East Providence, Rhode Island
- Coordinates: 41.8422°N 71.36986°W
- Area: 13 acres (5.3 ha)
- Built: 1883
- Architect: Austin Co.; Stuart, James & Cook
- Part of: Phillipsdale Historic District (ID11000675)
- NRHP reference No.: 06000974

Significant dates
- Added to NRHP: November 1, 2006
- Designated CP: September 15, 2011

The Richmond Paper Company Mill Complex is an historic paper mill at 310 Bourne Avenue in East Providence, Rhode Island, United States. It comprises a group of mainly brick buildings on 13 acres (5.3 ha) of land, bounded on the north by Bourne Avenue, the east by railroad tracks, the west by the Seekonk River, and on the south by land formerly owned by the Washburn Wire Company. The first seven of the surviving buildings were built between 1883 and 1887 by the Richmond Paper Company. The property was acquired at auction in 1894 by Eugene Phillips, who operated the American Electrical Works on the premises, adding more buildings between 1900 and 1930 and demolishing several buildings specific to paper processing. The modern property has a variety of light industrial uses. The Richmond Paper Company was the place where Arthur Dehon Little began his career.

The complex was listed on the National Register of Historic Places in 2006, and is part of the Phillipsdale Historic District.

== See also ==
- National Register of Historic Places listings in Providence County, Rhode Island
