= Elm Tree Plat Historic District =

Historic district in Rhode Island, United States

- U.S. National Register of Historic Places
- U.S. Historic district
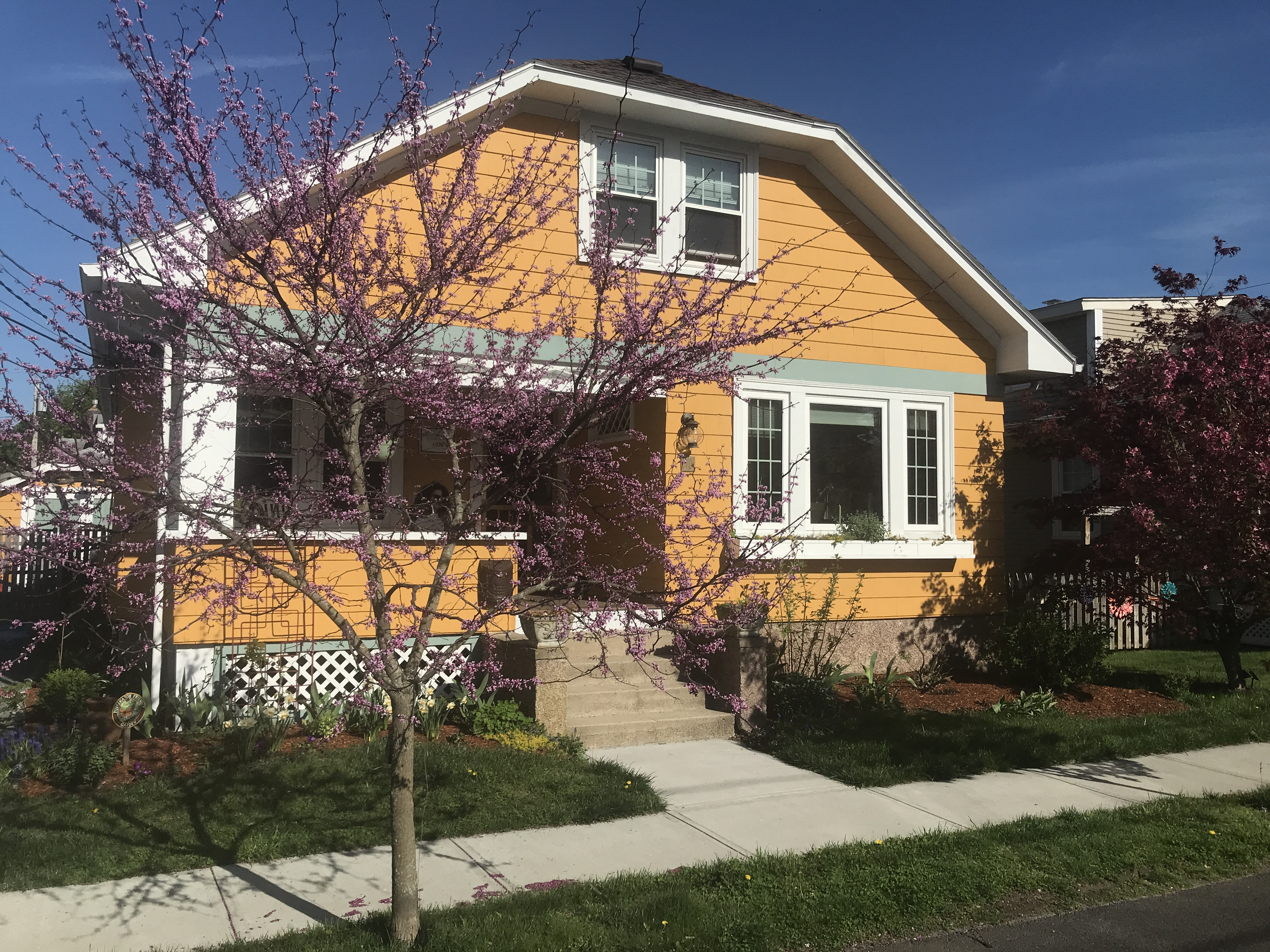
- 30 Elinora Street

- Location within Rhode Island Location within the United States
- Location: Charlotte & Elinora Sts., Fenner, Harvey & Willett Aves., East Providence, Rhode Island
- Coordinates: 41.7702°N 71.3528°W
- Area: 6.5 acres (2.6 ha)
- NRHP reference No.: 15000829
- Added to NRHP: November 19, 2015

The Elm Tree Plat Historic District encompasses an early 20th-century neighborhood of East Providence, Rhode Island. Developed beginning in 1924, it contains 53 single-family residences and one commercial building, most of which were built between 1925 and 1935 as a streetcar suburb development serving the Providence area. Most of the houses were built by a single pair of developers, Severin Carlson and Carl Johnson, and are one and two-story Bungalow-style houses. It is roughly bounded by Willett, Harvey, and Fenner Avenues and Charlotte Street, in southern East Providence.

The district was listed on the National Register of Historic Places in 2015.

== See also ==
- National Register of Historic Places listings in Providence County, Rhode Island
