= East Providence, Rhode Island =

City in Rhode Island, United States

East Providence
- City
- City of East Providence
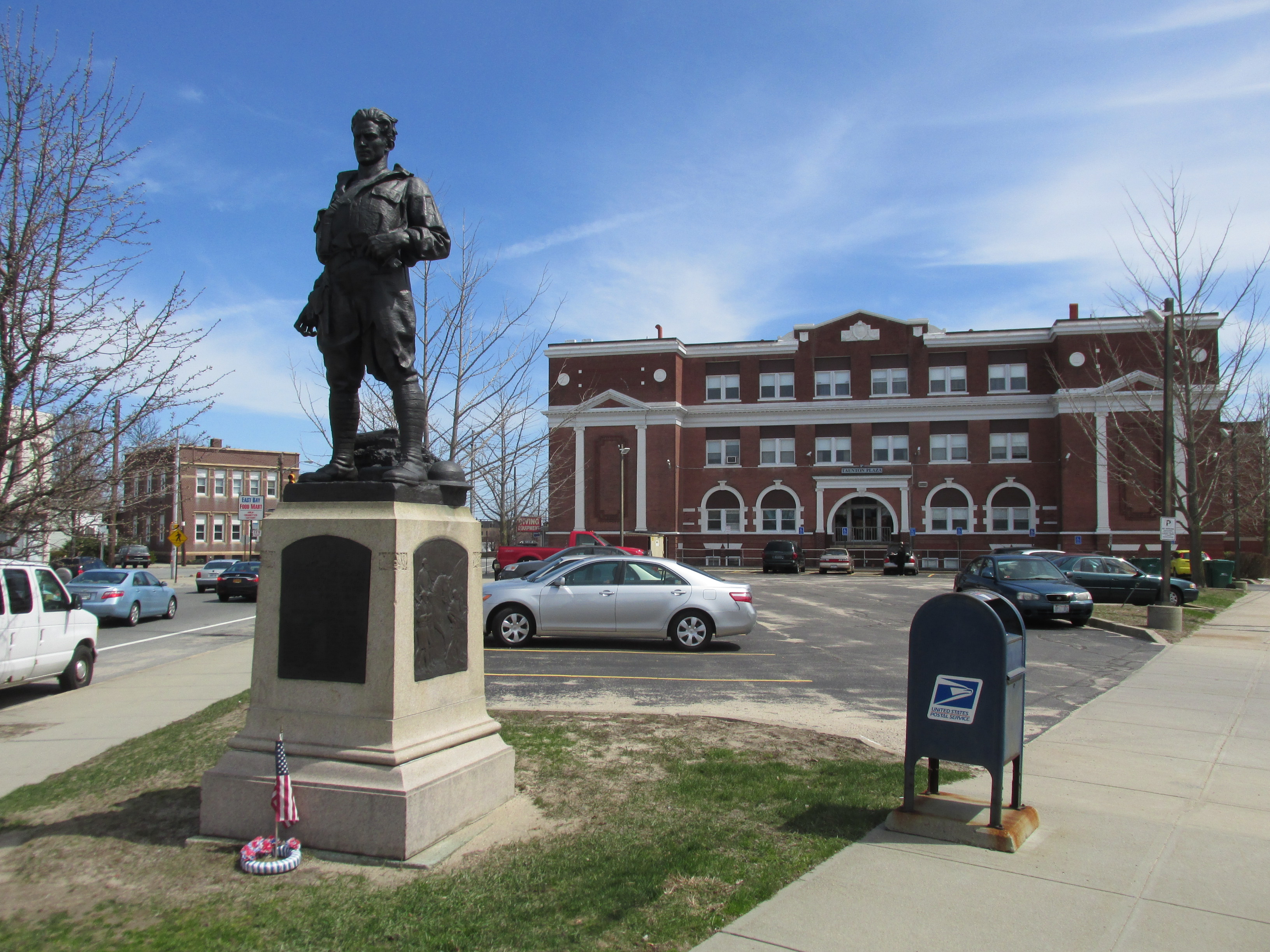
- World War I Memorial and Taunton Plaza

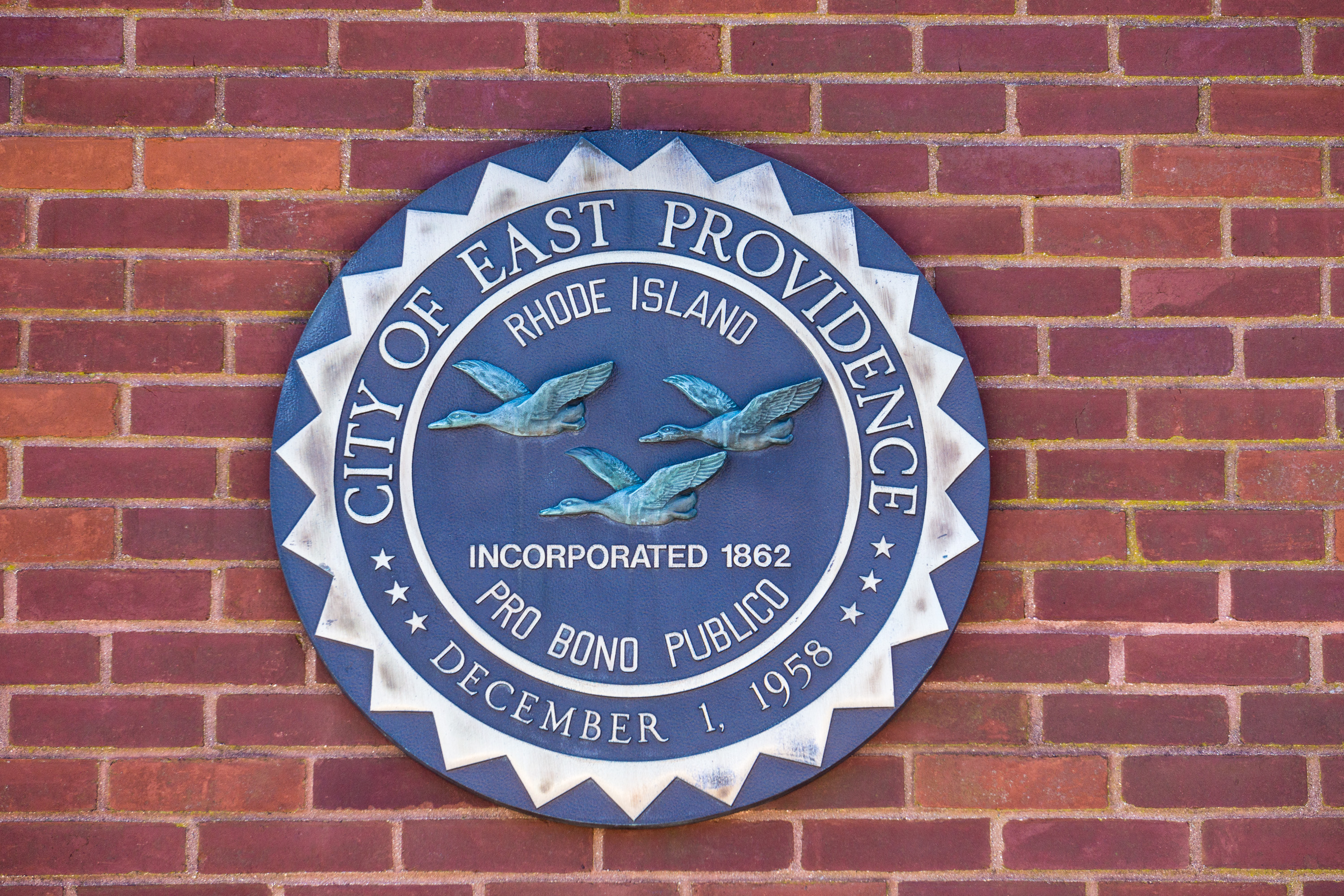
- Flag Seal Logo

- Location in Providence County and the state of Rhode Island.

- Location in Rhode Island Location in the United States
- Coordinates: 41°48′49″N 71°22′12″W
- Country: United States
- State: Rhode Island
- County: Providence
- Incorporated (town): March 1, 1862
- Incorporated (city): 1958

Government
  - Type: Mayor-council
  - Mayor: Roberto DaSilva
  - City Council: Robert Rodericks: At-Large (Council President); Frank Rego: Ward 1 (Council Vice-President); Anna M. Sousa: Ward 2 Francis Fogarty: Ward 3 Rick Lawson: Ward 4

Area
  - Total: 16.61 sq mi (43.01 km^{2})
  - Land: 13.29 sq mi (34.41 km^{2})
  - Water: 3.32 sq mi (8.60 km^{2})
- Elevation: 62 ft (19 m)

Population (2020)
  - Total: 47,139
  - Density: 3,548.5/sq mi (1,370.08/km^{2})
- Time zone: UTC−5 (Eastern)
  - Summer (DST): UTC−4 (Eastern)
- ZIP code: 02914, 02915, 02916
- Area code: 401
- FIPS code: 44-22960
- GNIS feature ID: 1219590
- Website: https://eastprovidenceri.gov/

East Providence is a city in Providence County, Rhode Island, United States. The population was 47,139 at the 2020 census, making it the fifth-largest city in the state.

== Geography ==
East Providence is located between the Providence and Seekonk Rivers on the west and the Seekonk area of Massachusetts on the east. According to the United States Census Bureau, the city has a total area of 16.6 square miles (43 km^{2}), of which 13.4 square miles (35 km^{2}) is land and 3.2 square miles (8.3 km^{2}) (19.33%) is water.

The following villages are located in East Providence:

- East Providence Center
- Riverside
- Rumford

== Governance ==
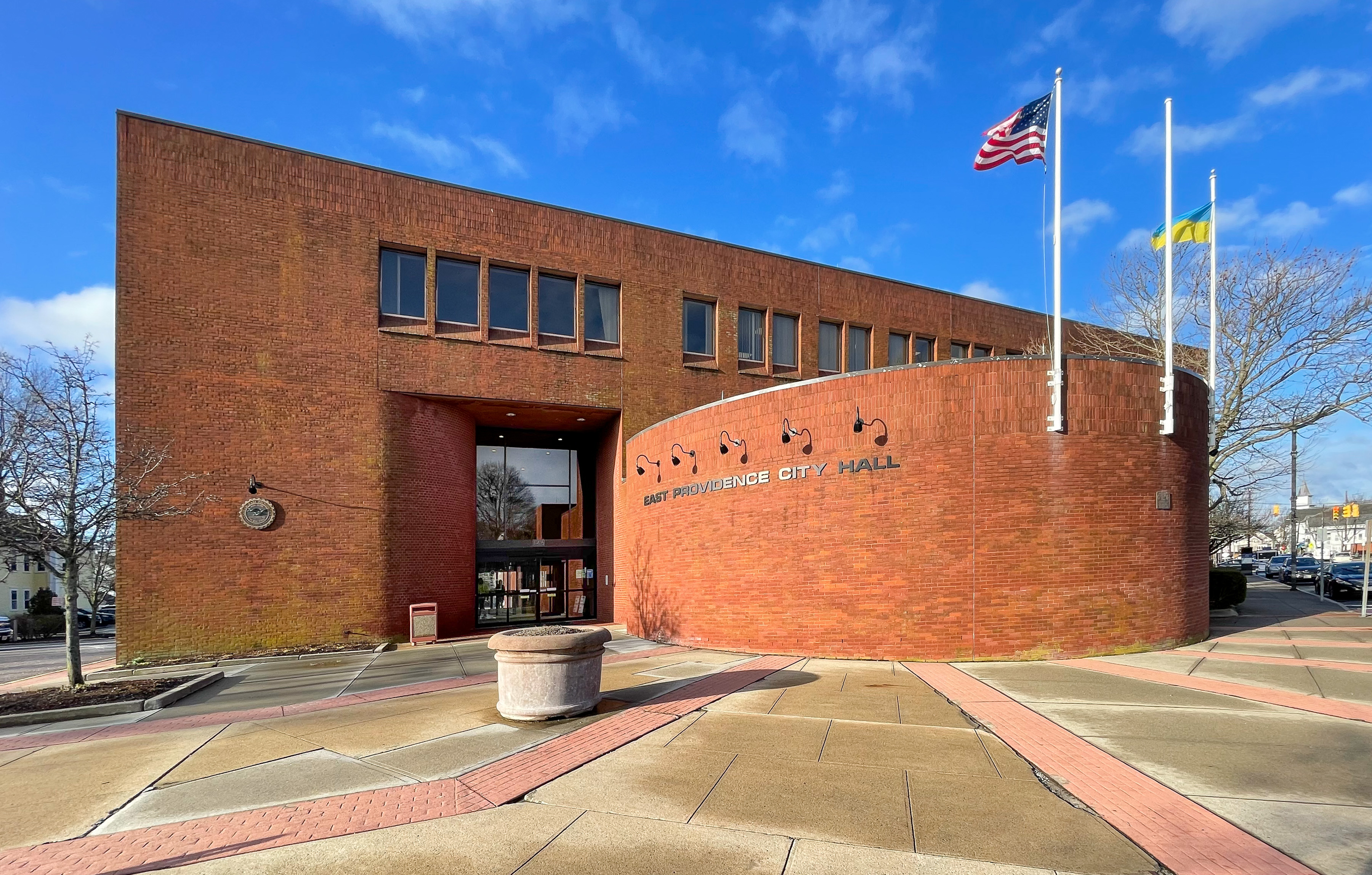
City Hall

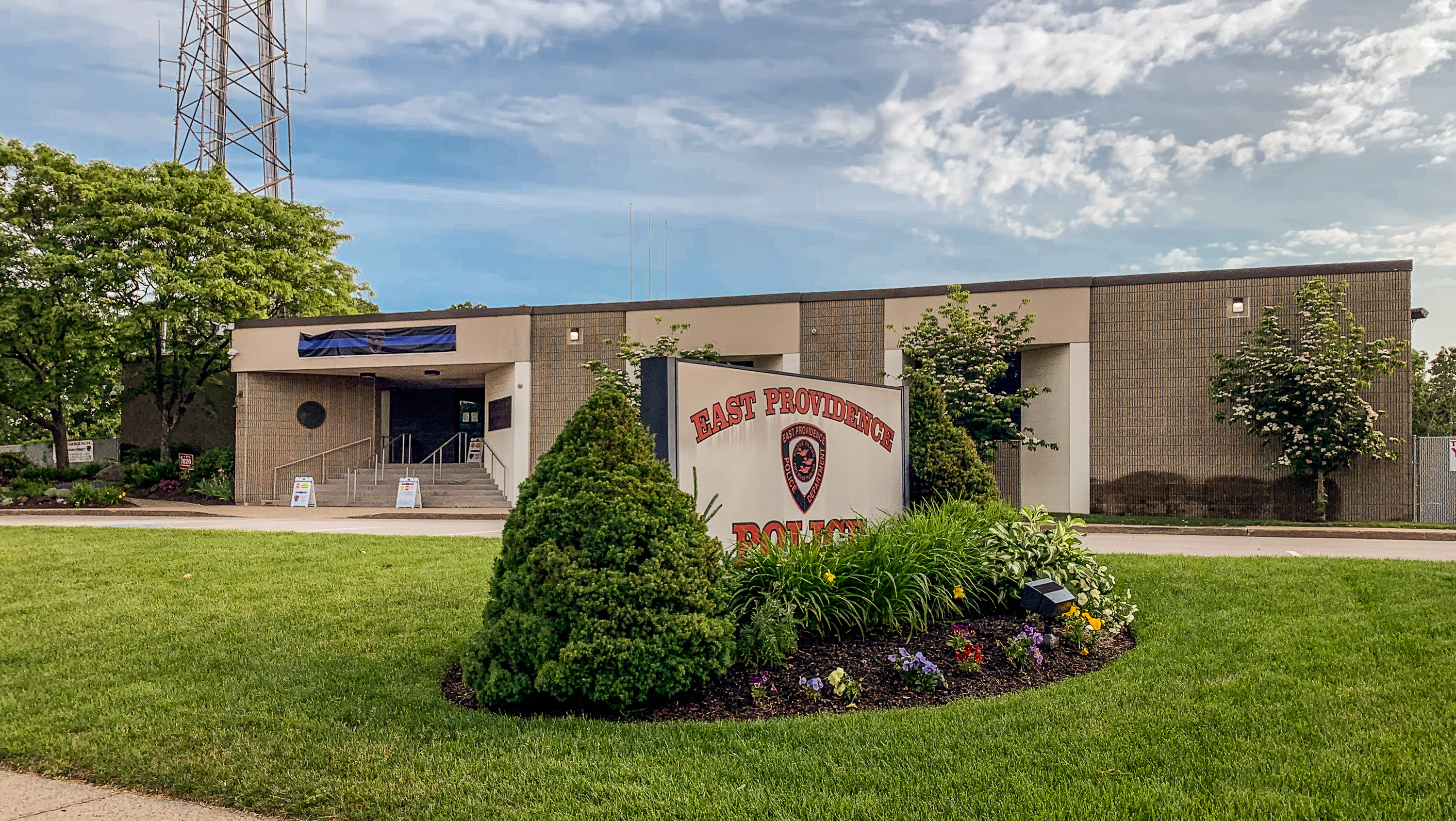
Police station, Waterman Avenue

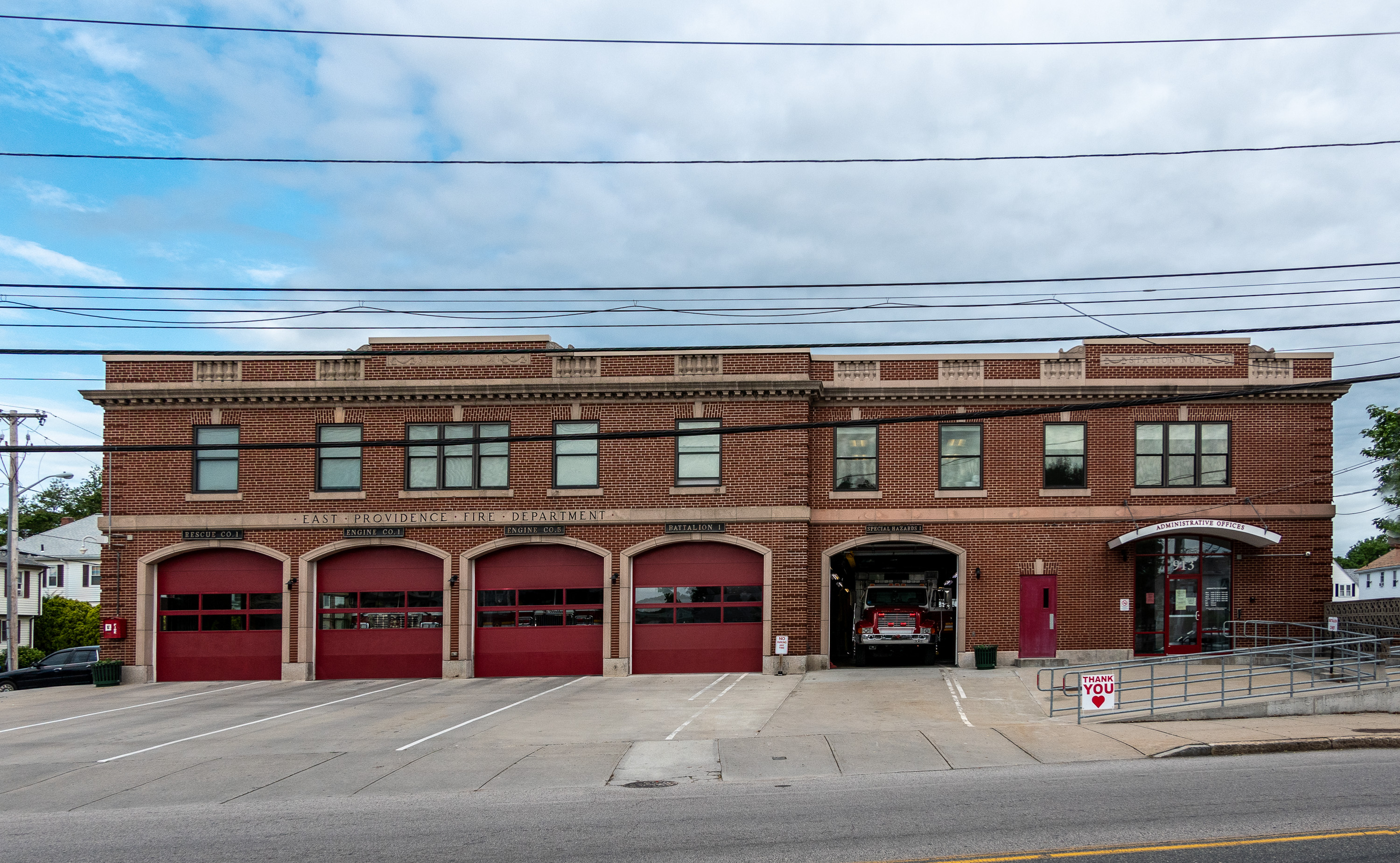
Fire station, 913 Broadway

The city of East Providence is governed by an elected mayor and a five-member city council, with the mayor and counselors elected every four years. City council members are elected one each from four wards and one elected at-large.

Per its charter, East Providence holds non-partisan elections for all local offices.

=== Executive branch ===
The mayor is the leader of the city and the chief executive officer. The mayor runs the daily operations of the city, enforces the charter and ordinances of the city and appoints all department heads except the city clerk. The current mayor of East Providence is Roberto DaSilva, who took office on January 9, 2019. He is the first elected mayor in the city's history.

Until January 9, 2019, the day-to-day operations were performed by a professional city manager appointed by the city council, and the "mayor" was the president of the city council, acting ceremonially.

=== Legislative branch ===
The city council sets all city ordinances, sets the budget of the city (with recommendation from the mayor) and provides legislative oversight for city operations.

The city council elects a council president and council vice-president to preside over meetings. The city council also appoints the city clerk.

Up until 2019, The city council served two-year terms, and the city council oversaw the entire city government under a council-manager system.

As of 2026, the members of the East Providence City Council are:

- Robert Rodericks—At-Large (Council President)
- Frank Rego—Ward 1 (Council Vice-President)
- Anna Sousa—Ward 2
- Francis Fogarty—Ward 3
- Rick Lawson—Ward 4

=== Judicial branch ===
The city of East Providence has a municipal court, which hears cases regarding violations of municipal ordinances, housing code violations and minor traffic violations. The city also has a probate court, which handles estates, name changes, guardianships and related matters. Judges for both courts are appointed by the mayor with confirmation by the city council for a term of two years.

=== Education governance ===
The city also has an elected school committee, elected for two-year terms by the same ward system as the city council. The school committee has broad authority to manage the school system, including setting all school system policies, setting the school system budget (within the general appropriation by the city, state and federal government) as well as selecting and overseeing the Superintendent of Schools.

As of 2026, the members of the East Providence School Committee are:

- Anthony J. Ferreira—At-Large
- Ryan Queenan—Ward 1
- Antonio deSimas—Ward 2 (Committee Vice-Chair)
- David Luiz—Ward 3 (Committee Chair)
- Jessica Beauchaine—Ward 4

=== Other boards and commissions ===
The city has an appointed library board of trustees which governs the city's library system and various other appointed governing and advisory boards and commissions.

== Demographics ==
Historical population
| Census | Pop. | Note | %± |
|---|---|---|---|
| 1870 | 2,668 | | — |
| 1880 | 5,056 | | 89.5% |
| 1890 | 8,422 | | 66.6% |
| 1900 | 12,138 | | 44.1% |
| 1910 | 15,808 | | 30.2% |
| 1920 | 21,793 | | 37.9% |
| 1930 | 29,995 | | 37.6% |
| 1940 | 32,165 | | 7.2% |
| 1950 | 35,871 | | 11.5% |
| 1960 | 41,955 | | 17.0% |
| 1970 | 48,207 | | 14.9% |
| 1980 | 50,980 | | 5.8% |
| 1990 | 50,380 | | −1.2% |
| 2000 | 48,688 | | −3.4% |
| 2010 | 47,037 | | −3.4% |
| 2020 | 47,139 | | 0.2% |
U.S. Decennial Census

=== 2020 census ===
As of the 2020 census, East Providence had a population of 47,139, 21,050 households, and 11,510 families. The population density was 3,548.6 per square mile (1,370.1/km^{2}). There were 22,196 housing units at an average density of 1,670.9 per square mile (645.1/km^{2}).

100.0% of residents lived in urban areas, while 0.0% lived in rural areas.

The median age was 44.9 years, 16.7% of residents were under the age of 18, and 22.3% of residents were 65 years of age or older. For every 100 females there were 88.9 males, and for every 100 females age 18 and over there were 85.9 males age 18 and over.

There were 21,050 households in East Providence, of which 23.0% had children under the age of 18 living in them. Of all households, 39.0% were married-couple households, 19.5% were households with a male householder and no spouse or partner present, and 33.8% were households with a female householder and no spouse or partner present. About 35.5% of all households were made up of individuals and 16.0% had someone living alone who was 65 years of age or older. The average household size was 2.3 and the average family size was 3.1. The percent of those with a bachelor’s degree or higher was estimated to be 25.3% of the population.

There were 22,196 housing units, of which 5.2% were vacant. The homeowner vacancy rate was 1.3% and the rental vacancy rate was 4.0%.

Racial composition as of the 2020 census
| Race | Number | Percent |
|---|---|---|
| White | 36,474 | 77.4% |
| Black or African American | 2,547 | 5.4% |
| American Indian and Alaska Native | 199 | 0.4% |
| Asian | 996 | 2.1% |
| Native Hawaiian and Other Pacific Islander | 17 | 0.0% |
| Some other race | 2,277 | 4.8% |
| Two or more races | 4,629 | 9.8% |
| Hispanic or Latino (of any race) | 3,328 | 7.1% |

The 2016–2020 5-year American Community Survey estimates show that the median household income was $63,158 (with a margin of error of +/- $3,857) and the median family income was $88,973 (+/- $7,921). Males had a median income of $47,414 (+/- $3,540) versus $37,833 (+/- $2,442) for females. The median income for those above 16 years old was $42,543 (+/- $2,745). Approximately, 5.9% of families and 9.6% of the population were below the poverty line, including 9.3% of those under the age of 18 and 11.4% of those ages 65 or over.

=== 2000 census ===
As of the census of 2000, there were 48,688 people, 20,530 households, and 12,851 families residing in the city. The population density was 3,632.1 inhabitants per square mile (1,402.4/km^{2}). There were 21,309 housing units at an average density of 1,589.6 per square mile (613.7/km^{2}). The racial makeup of the city was 86.49% White, 5.02% African American, 0.46% Native American, 1.15% Asian, 0.05% Pacific Islander, 2.80% from other races, and 4.03% from two or more races. Hispanic or Latino of any race were 1.89% of the population.

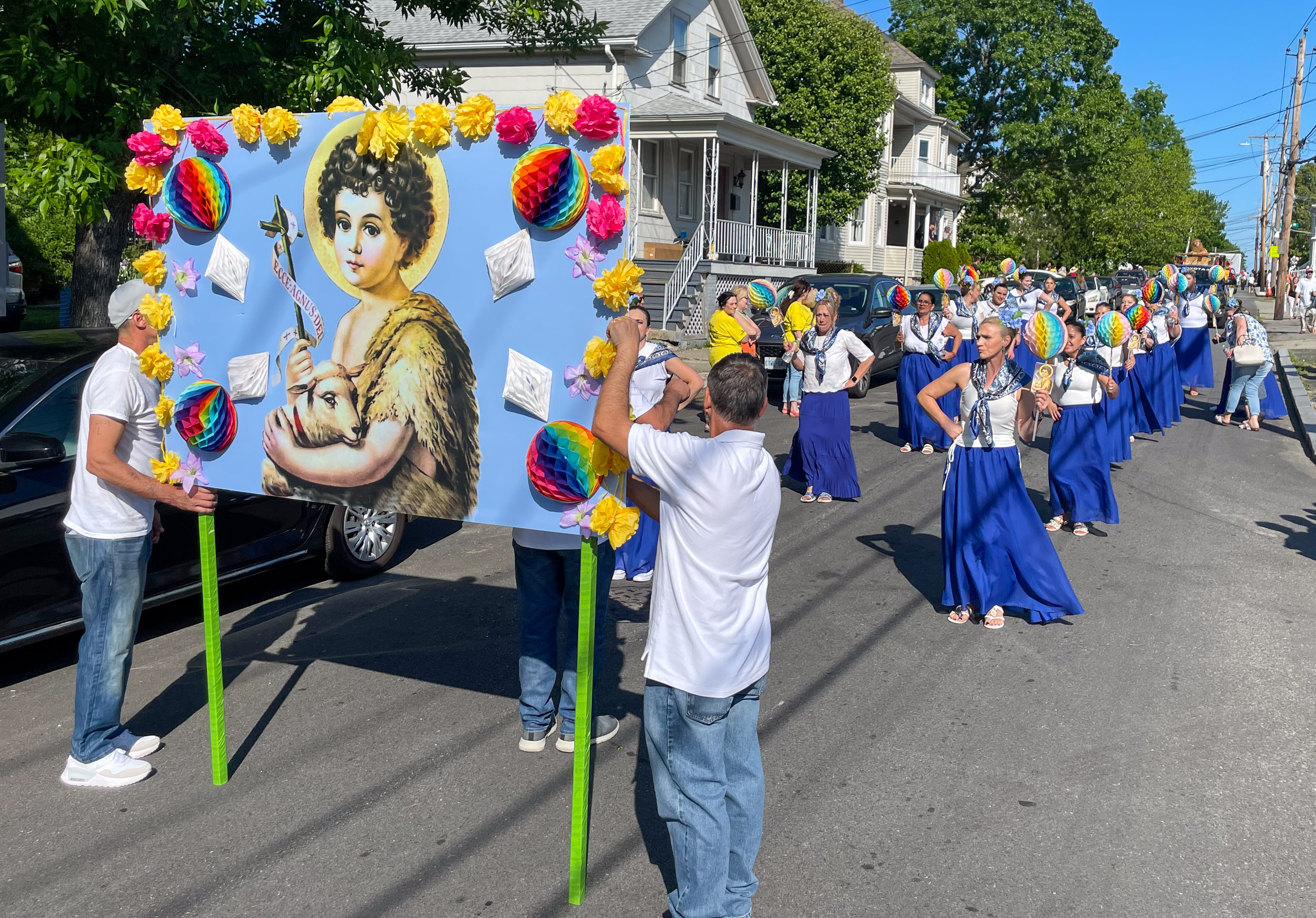
Portuguese Bodo de Leite parade on Orchard Street

There were 20,530 households, out of which 27.1% had children under the age of 18 living with them, 46.3% were married couples living together, 12.7% had a female householder with no husband present, and 37.4% were non-families. 32.4% of all households were made up of individuals, and 14.6% had someone living alone who was 65 years of age or older. The average household size was 2.33 and the average family size was 2.99.

In the city, the population was spread out, with 21.7% under the age of 18, 7.4% from 18 to 24, 29.4% from 25 to 44, 22.6% from 45 to 64, and 18.9% who were 65 years of age or older. The median age was 40 years. For every 100 females, there were 86.8 males. For every 100 females age 18 and over, there were 82.6 males.

The median income for a household in the city was $39,108, and the median income for a family was $48,463. Males had a median income of $34,342 versus $26,423 for females. The per capita income for the city was $19,527. About 6.3% of families and 8.6% of the population were below the poverty line, including 10.7% of those under age 18 and 11.0% of those aged 65 or over.

=== Ancestry ===
The population has large immigrant communities from mainland Portugal, the Azores, Madeira and Cape Verde. Approximately 24% of East Providence residents report Portuguese ancestry, followed by Irish at 18%, and Italian with 11%.

== Education ==
A.B. Hennessey School on Fort Street

East Providence has 13 public and five non-public schools:

=== Public schools ===
==== Elementary ====
- Agnes B. "Hennessey"
- Alice M. "Waddington" – built 1954
- Emma G. "Whiteknact"
- James R.D. "Oldham"
- Kent Heights
- Myron J. "Francis" - built 1989
- Orlo Avenue School
- Silver Spring

==== Middle schools ====
- Edward R. Martin Middle School – built 1977
- Riverside Middle School

==== High school ====
- Grove Ave. Educational Development Center
- East Providence High School – built 2021
  - East Providence Career & Technical Center

==== Non-public elementary and junior-high schools ====
- St. Mary "Bay View" Academy
- Sacred Heart School
- St. Margaret School
- Ocean State Montessori School
- The Gordon School
- Providence Country Day (P.C.D.).
- The Wolf School

==== Non-public high schools ====
- St. Mary "Bay View" Academy
- Providence Country Day (P.C.D.).

== Music and Arts ==
- On September 2, 1977, The Beach Boys performed before an audience of 40,000 at Narragansett Park in Pawtucket, Rhode Island, which remains the largest concert audience in Rhode Island history. The City of East Providence provided parking in the area next to Narragansett Park. On August 9, 2017, a commemoration ceremony produced by Al Gomes and Connie Watrous of Big Noise took place in East Providence with The Beach Boys, along with East Providence Mayor James Briden and Assistant Mayor Robert Britto, who gave The Beach Boys the coveted Key to the City. The street where the concert stage formerly stood at 510 Narragansett Park Drive in Pawtucket, RI was officially renamed to "Beach Boys Way".

== Health and Medicine ==
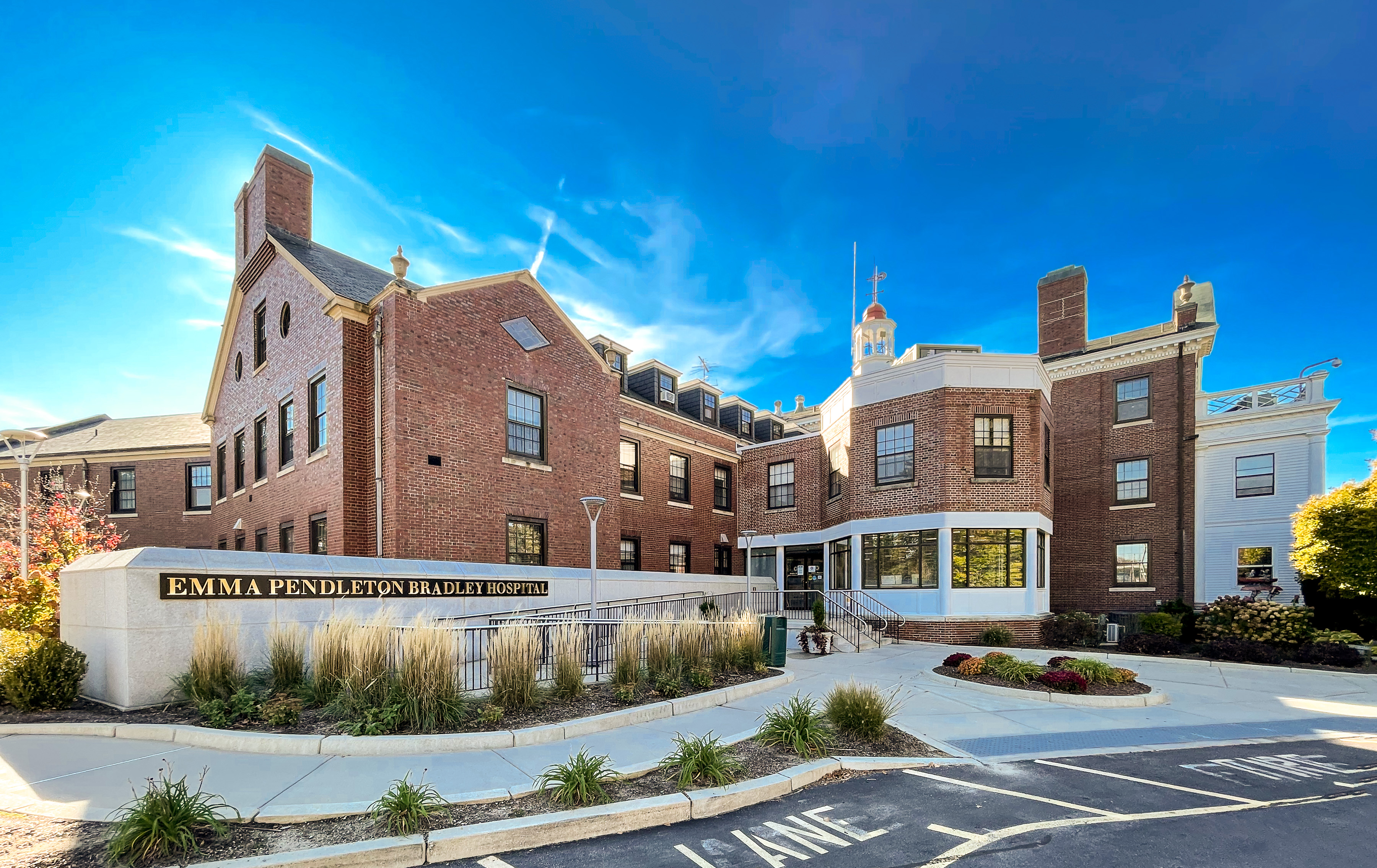
Bradley Hospital

Bradley Hospital, the nation's first psychiatric facility exclusively for children, was founded in 1931. It is a teaching hospital for the Warren Alpert Medical School of Brown University.

== National Register of Historic Places listings in East Providence ==
- Bicknell–Armington Lightning Splitter House
- Boston and Providence Railroad Bridge
- Bridgham Farm
- Carpenter, Lakeside, and Springvale Cemeteries
- Crescent Park Looff Carousel, (National Historic Landmark)
- Elm Tree Plat Historic District
- Nathaniel Daggett House
- James Dennis House
- District 6 Schoolhouse
- Little Neck Cemetery
- Newman Cemetery
- Newman Congregational Church
- Oddfellows' Hall
- Pomham Rocks Light
- Rose Land Park Plat Historic District
- Richmond Paper Company Mill Complex
- Rumford Chemical Works and Mill House Historic District
- Rumford Historic District
- Squantum Association
- St. Mary's Episcopal Church
- Phillip Walker House
- Whitcomb Farm
- World War I Memorial

== Media ==
=== Newspaper ===
==== Weekly ====
- The East Providence Post (Published by East Bay Media Group)

==== Monthly ====
- The East Providence Reporter

=== Radio ===
==== AM ====
- 1110/WPMZ: Spanish-language “Poder”.

== Notable people ==
- Arunah Shepherdson Abell (1806–1888), philanthropist and newspaper publisher (Philadelphia Public Ledger and The Baltimore Sun); born in East Providence
- Rebecca DiPietro, model and WWE Diva; lives in East Providence
- John Michael Greer, author and former Archdruid; lives in East Providence
- Elisabeth Hasselbeck, TV personality on Fox & Friends and The View; attended and graduated from St. Mary Academy – Bay View in 1995
- Jimmy Hatlo, cartoonist, was born in East Providence
- Claudia Jordan, model and reality TV personality (Deal or No Deal, Celebrity Apprentice); Miss Rhode Island USA (1997); grew up in East Providence
- Jennifer Lee, co-writer of screenplay for Wreck-It Ralph; writer of screenplay for and co-director of Frozen; born in East Providence
- Davey Lopes, second baseman and coach for several Major League Baseball teams; born in East Providence
- Jamie Silva, football safety for the Indianapolis Colts; born in East Providence
- Meredith Vieira, hostess of Millionaire, co-host of Today and The View; born in East Providence
- Ron Wilson, hockey defenseman and coach for the US Olympic hockey team and several National Hockey League teams; attended East Providence High School
