= Arthur Little =

Arthur Little may refer to:

- Arthur Dehon Little (1863–1935), American chemist and chemical engineer
- Arthur D. Little, an international management consulting firm
