= Arthur D. Little =

American management consulting firm

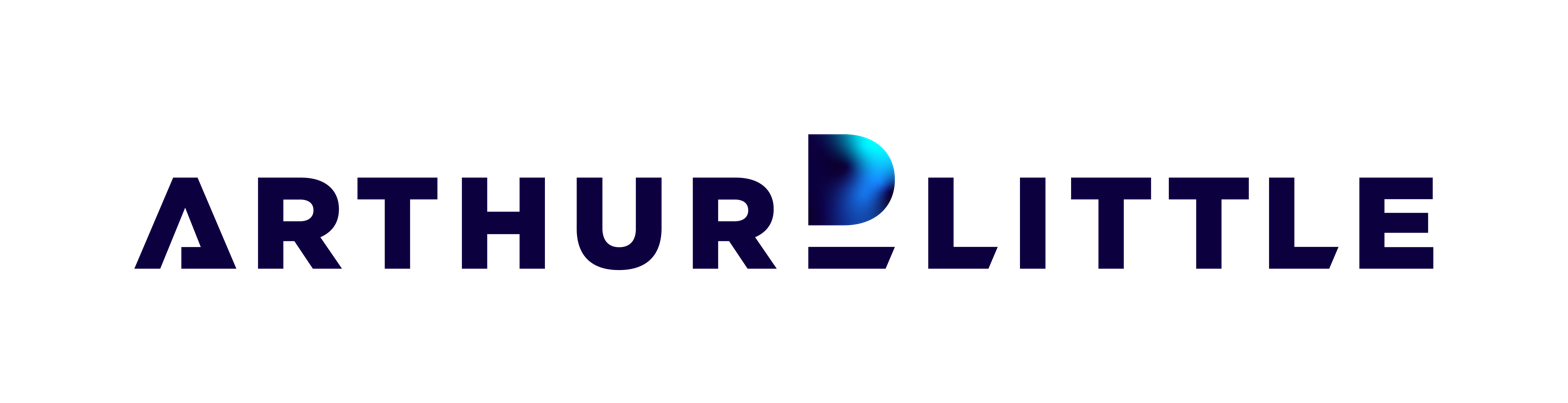
- Type: Incorporated partnership
- Industry: Management consulting
- Founded: 1886; 140 years ago
- Founder: Arthur Dehon Little
- Headquarters: Brussels, Belgium
- Number of locations: 46 offices
- Key people: Ignacio Garcia Alves, Global CEO
- Products: Management consulting services
- Number of employees: 1,500
- Website: www.adlittle.com

Arthur D. Little is an international management consulting firm originally headquartered in Boston, Massachusetts, United States, founded in 1886 and formally incorporated in 1909 by Arthur Dehon Little, an MIT chemist who extended the applications of cellulose acetate, especially its use as artificial silk. Arthur D. Little pioneered the concept of contracted professional services. The company played key roles in the development of business strategy, operations research, the word processor, the first synthetic penicillin, LexisNexis, SABRE, and NASDAQ.

== History ==
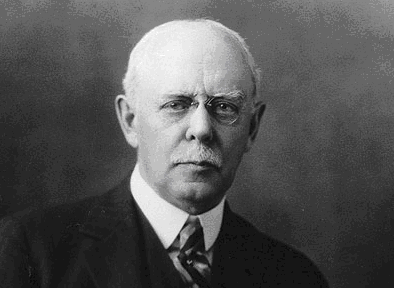
Arthur D. Little's eponymous founder

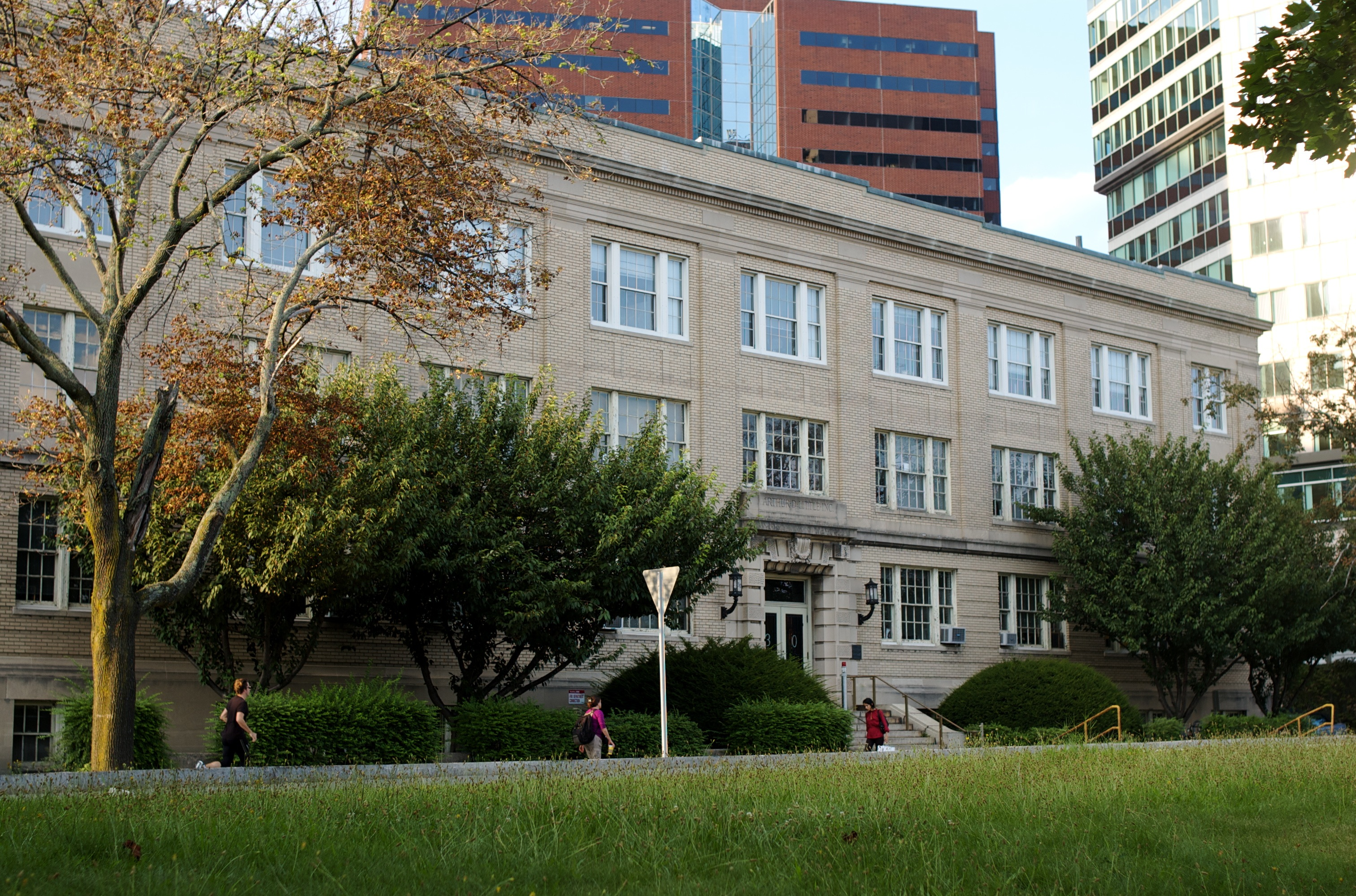
The Arthur D. Little Inc. building at 30 Memorial Drive in Cambridge, Massachusetts, near MIT, which opened in 1917.

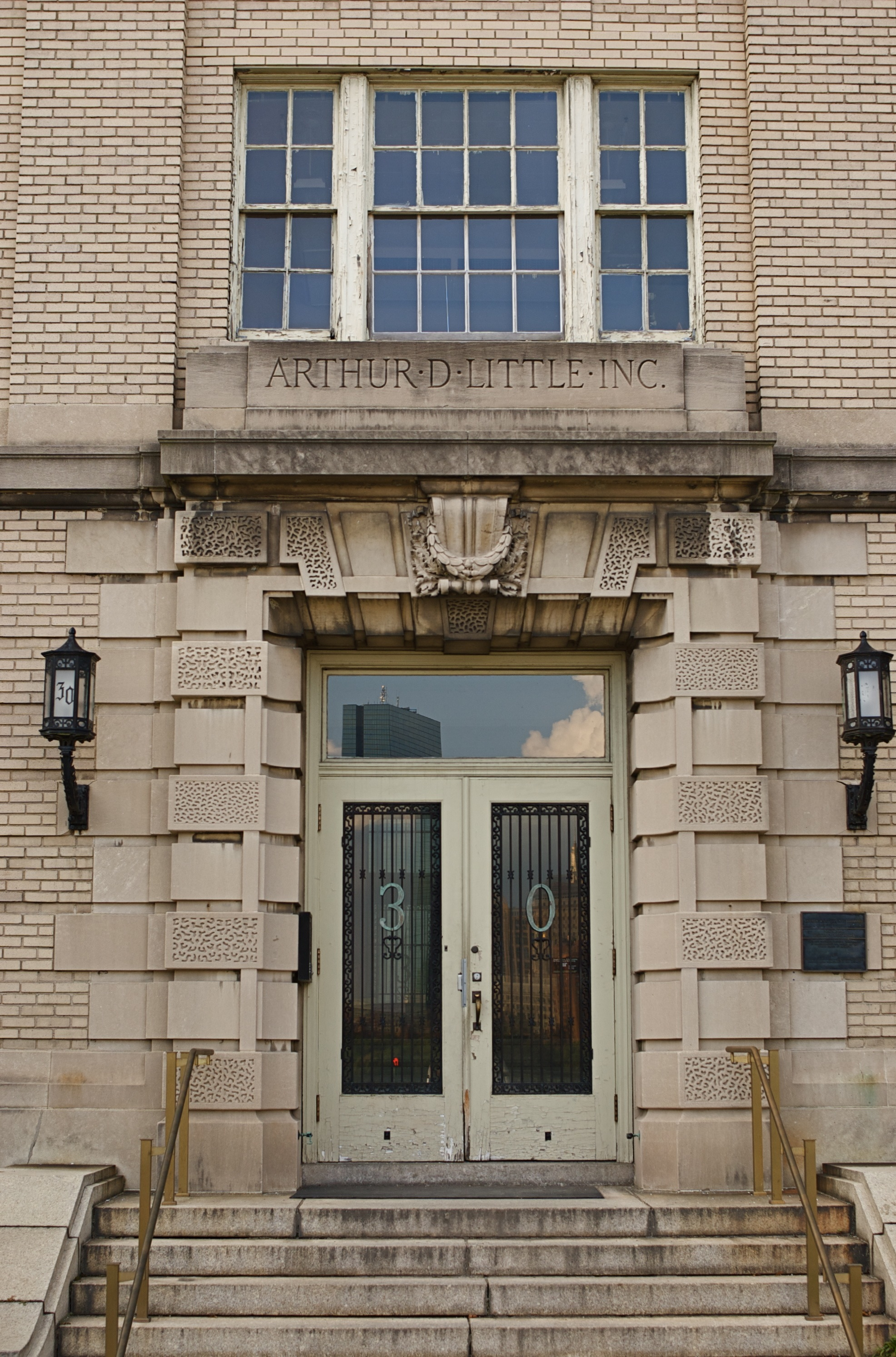
Entrance to 30 Memorial Drive ADL building

The roots of the company were started in 1886 by Arthur Dehon Little, an MIT chemist, and co-worker Roger B. Griffin (Russell B. Griffin), another chemist and a graduate of the University of Vermont who had met when they both worked for Richmond Paper Company. Their new company, Little & Griffin, was located in Boston where MIT was then located. Griffin and Little prepared a manuscript for The Chemistry of Paper-making which was for many years an authoritative text in the area. The book had not been entirely finished when Griffin was killed in a laboratory accident in 1893.

Little, who had studied Chemistry at MIT, collaborated with MIT and William Hultz Walker of the MIT Chemistry department, forming a partnership, Little & Walker, which lasted from 1900 to 1905, while both MIT and Little's company were still located in Boston. The partnership dissolved in 1905 when Walker dedicated all of his time to being in charge of the new Research Laboratory of Applied Chemistry at MIT.

Little continued on his own and incorporated the company, Arthur D. Little (ADL), in 1909. He conducted analytical studies, the precursor of the consulting studies for which the firm would later become famous. He also taught papermaking at MIT from 1893 to 1916.

In 1917, the company, originally based at 103 Milk Street in Boston, moved to its own building, the Arthur D. Little Inc., Building, at 30 Memorial Drive on the Charles River next to the new campus of MIT, which had also relocated from Boston to Cambridge. The building was added to the National Register of Historic Places in 1976. In November 1953, ADL opened a 40-acre site for its Acorn Park labs in west Cambridge, Massachusetts, about 6 miles (10 km) from MIT. The new site took its name from the company motto - "Glandes Sparge Ut Quercus Crescant," translated as "Scatter Acorns That Oaks May Grow." The Memorial Drive Trust, a tax-exempt retirement trust for the benefit of its employees, was set up.

== Selected projects ==
In 1911 ADL organized General Motors' first R&D lab, leading to the formation of the firm's dedicated management consulting division, and the birth of the management consulting industry.

In 1916 ADL was commissioned by the Canadian Pacific Railway to do a survey of Canada's natural resources.

In 1921 the firm succeeded in using a bucket of sows' ears to make a silk purse. This achievement later became part of the Smithsonian Institute's collection.

In 1961, Arthur D. Little launched the Arthur D. Little Management Education Institute, an accredited management education program to train general managers from developing countries. Following a structural reorganization it was renamed Hult International Business School

In 1968 ADL designed the NASDAQ stock exchange systems for London and Tokyo.

In 1969 ADL developed the Apollo 11 Laser Ranging Retro-Reflector experiment which were installed on the Moon as part of the Apollo 11 mission.

In 1980, ADL produced the European Commission's first white paper on telecommunications deregulation, having completed the first worldwide telecommunications database on phones installed, markets, technical trends, services and regulatory information. It also helped privatize British Rail.

== Bankruptcy, acquisition, and Management Buy Out by Partners ==
Arthur D. Little filed for Chapter 11 bankruptcy protection in 2002. At an auction in 2002, TIAX LLC, formed by Kenan Sahin, acquired the assets, contracts, and staff of Arthur D. Little's U.S. Technology & Innovation business. Paris-based Altran Technologies bought the non-U.S. assets and brand name of Arthur D. Little.

A group of partners led a management buyout from the Altran group in 2011. It was completed on 30 December 2011 with the majority of ADL directors becoming partners and shareholders. A small number of senior principals, as well as the CFO and COO, also became shareholders. The company was reestablished in the US in 2016. It has appeared on the Forbes list of "America's Best Management Consulting Firms" every year since then.

== Controversy ==
Bhopal disaster

In 1987, ADL claimed that sabotage was likely the cause of the Bhopal disaster, which resulted in the death of thousands. ADL's investigation was funded by Union Carbide, the company that owned the chemical plant responsible for the chemical disaster.

Phillip Morris-funded study on the economic impact of smoking in Czech Republic

In 2001, a Philip Morris-funded ADL study concluded that smoking can help the Czech economy Phillip Morris issued an apology following the report's publication.

== Publications ==
=== Books ===
- Guillebaud, David (2016). Disruption Denial: How Companies Are Ignoring What Is Staring Them in the Face. LID Publishing. ISBN 978-1910649770.
- Träm, Michael (2010). Innovate Your Company: Trends to Follow for a Competitive Advantage. Wiley. ISBN 9783527505227.
- Deneux, François; Rouach, Daniel; Louzoun, Steve (2010). Incubators of the World. Pearson. ISBN 978-2744064593.
- Scott-Morgan, Peter; Hoving, Erik (2001). The End of Change: How Your Company Can Sustain Growth and Innovation While Avoiding Change Fatigue. McGraw-Hill. ISBN 0071357009.
- Senge, Peter (1999). The Dance of Change: The Challenges to Sustaining Momentum in a Learning Organization. Crown Business. ISBN 0385493223.
- Deschamps, Jean-Philippe; Nayak, P. Ranganath (1995). Product Juggernauts: How Companies Mobilize to Generate a Stream of Market Winners. Boston: Harvard Business School Press. ISBN 0-87584-341-7. OCLC 31330407.
- Scott-Morgan, Peter (1994). The Unwritten Rules of the Game: Master Them, Shatter Them, and Break Through the Barriers to Organizational Change. McGraw-Hill. ISBN 0070570752.
- Jonash, Ronald; Sommerlatte, Tom (1994). The Innovation Premium: How Next Generation Companies Are Achieving Peak Performance And Profitability. Perseus Publishing. ISBN 978-0738203607.
- Nayak, P. Ranganath; Ketteringham, John M. (1994). Breakthroughs!. Pfeiffer. ISBN 0893842508.
- Roussel, Philip A.; Saad, Kamal N.; Erickson, Tamara J. (1991). Third Generation R & D: Managing the Link to Corporate Strategy. Boston: Harvard Business School Press. ISBN 0-87584-252-6. OCLC 22596604.

=== Global reports and studies ===
- Twice a year, Arthur D. Little publishes its latest thinking on strategy, technology and innovation in its corporate magazine Prism.
- The Annual Arthur D. Little - Exane BNP Paribas report which has provided in-depth analysis of the telecoms sector since 2001
- Media Flow of Funds 2017 : Consolidate, Diversity, or Perish, which is the most recent in a multi-year study assessing the digital shifts in the content industry and the associated shifts in value along the industry ecosystem.
- Telecoms & Media Flagship Report 2017 : Major strategic choices ahead of TelCos: Reconfiguring for value which assesses how digitalization will impact telecommunication operators' configuration.
- The Future of Urban Mobility Study (2014 version in cooperation with International Association of Public Transport) which is a comprehensive global urban mobility benchmarking report
- The Global Innovation Excellence Study which benchmarks innovation performance is published every 2–3 years and is in its 9th iteration
- Socioeconomic Effects of Broadband Speed

== Notable current and former employees ==
Business

- Al Angrisani, Angrisani Turnarounds, LLC
- William J. J. Gordon and George M. Prince, creators of Synectics.
- Bruce Henderson, founder of the Boston Consulting Group
- Charles Koch, chairman and chief executive officer, Koch Industries
- Royal Little, founder of Textron, Inc.
- H. Donald Wilson, first president of LexisNexis database
- Merrill Cook, former member of the United States House of Representatives from Utah.
- Musadik Malik, Federal Minister of State for Petroleum of Pakistan.
- Glen Fukushima, advisor to U.S. President Bill Clinton
- James M. Gavin, US Army Lieutenant General, World War II veteran, Commander of the 82nd Airborne Division, and later US Ambassador to France
- David Brown, Chief Executive IChemE (Institution of Chemical Engineers)
- Earl P. Stevenson, Arthur D. Little's president and chairman of the Ad Hoc Committee on Chemical and Biological Warfare, which in 1950 expedited the creation of Camp Detrick's Special Operations Division that consolidated chemical and biological warfare projects in one location.
- Winnett Boyd, engineer
- Fischer Black, economist who co-developed option pricing, which led to a Nobel Prize for his co-authors (the Nobel prize is not awarded posthumously)
- Philip Chapman, Australian-born American astronaut
- Raymond Gilmartin, American businessman, who worked as a consultant for eight years after graduation from Harvard Business School
- Peter Glaser, inventor of the Solar power satellite
- David Levy, inventor
- Pamela Low, developed the flavored coating for Cap'n Crunch cereal
- Donald Schön, academic
- Peter Scott-Morgan, Academic & Cyborg
- Jack Treynor, economist
- Bernard Vonnegut, atmospheric scientist
