= George Prince =

George Prince may refer to:

- George Prince (footballer) (1918–2002), Australian rules football player
- George M. Prince (1918–2009), co-creator of synectics with William J. J. Gordon
- George W. Prince (1854–1939), U.S. Representative from Illinois
- MV George Prince, American passenger ferry which sank in 1976
