= Cambridge Discovery Park =

Coordinates: 42°23′53.50″N 71°8′50.63″W

Cambridge Discovery Park (CDP or the Park), formerly known as Acorn Park, is a 30 acres (12 ha) office and laboratory campus in Cambridge, Massachusetts. It is located along Massachusetts Route 2, and is connected to the Alewife Red Line subway terminus and bus station by a walking path, and to the Minuteman Bikeway.

It was the home office of Arthur D. Little, an international management consulting firm, from 1953 to 2002.

Since 2000, CDP has been owned and managed by an affiliate of Bulfinch, a real estate firm. Bulfinch has since redeveloped the office park, positioning it as a "world-class sustainable urban office and research campus".

The Park is master-planned for six different LEED-certified office and laboratory buildings totaling up to 820,000 sf and two structured parking garages. It includes green space with walking and bicycle trails as well as two buildings and a parking garage.

Cambridge Discovery Park and surrounding Alewife Brook Reservation represents one of the largest campuses in Cambridge (after Harvard and MIT) and is home to tenants including Forrester Research, the Smithsonian Astrophysical Observatory, Siemens, Pfizer, and Genocea Biosciences.

== History and original uses ==
The site of Cambridge Discovery Park was used for farming until 1950 when Arthur D. Little, Inc., the world's first management consultancy firm, which pioneered the concept of contracted professional services, bought seven acres of farmland, and began construction of one of the first post-war suburban office parks.

In 1953, the Park opened and was named Acorn Park, based on the company's motto: Glandes Sparge Ut Quercus Crescent 'Scatter Acorns That Oaks May Grow', and it grew to approximately 40 acres as new buildings were added. With simple exteriors and austere interiors, the Park projected a utilitarian image for a major industrial research centers. In total, Acorn Park consisted of 14 buildings and over 400,000sf with multiple surface parking lots. Arthur D. Little owned the site until 1999 and continued to occupy the site as a tenant until 2002.

The original buildings at Acorn Park were demolished by Bulfinch over several years beginning in 2003, partly to restore and preserve the neighboring wetlands. A memorial stands on the site to commemorate Arthur D. Little and includes the 1953 cornerstone of the first Arthur D. Little building. In 2011, Bulfinch received a preservation award from the Cambridge Historical Commission for this memorial.

== Development ==
Cambridge Discovery Park is master-planned and permitted for 820,000 sf and is being developed in phases. Building 100 (150,00sf +/-) was first developed and leased by the Smithsonian Astrophysical Observatory; Building 200-300 (200,000 sf +/-LEED-Gold certified) followed and is currently leased by Forrester Research, and a 650 space +/-parking garage also has been developed. Approximately 450,000 sf +/- of office and/or laboratory space and an additional parking garage remain to be developed. Bulfinch manages the property.

== Sustainability ==
When Bulfinch purchased the Arthur D. Little site in 2000, it returned nearly 10 acres back to open space and natural vegetation, restoring areas of the 1950s post-war office park into green space. Bulfinch also converted former parking lots and impervious areas into a natural buffer between the Little River and portion of the property to be developed (closest to Route 2), including adding ponds and other natural features to treat storm water, which earned Bulfinch the "Go Green" Award from the City of Cambridge for Stormwater Management Design.

Future buildings are intended to be LEED certified "silver" or higher

== Location ==
Cambridge Discovery Park is located adjacent to Route 2, the major highway for commuters coming from the North Western suburbs into Boston.

It is in close proximity to Harvard and MIT, it is not far from Logan International Airport and downtown Boston, and adjacent to the Alewife Reservation and Little River.

The Park is situated 10 minutes away from Massachusetts Route 128, which provides easy access to the Western Boston suburbs.

Public transportation can be accessed via a 300-yard pedestrian footpath or a shuttle bus to the MBTA Alewife Red Line station. The Park also is easily accessible by bicycle via the Minuteman Bike Path.

The Park is situated in a rapidly developing area of North Cambridge along Route 2, with numerous residential projects underway including the adjacent Vox on Two apartment complex, plus over 1,000 multi-family units within approximately ½ mile of the campus.

== Gallery ==
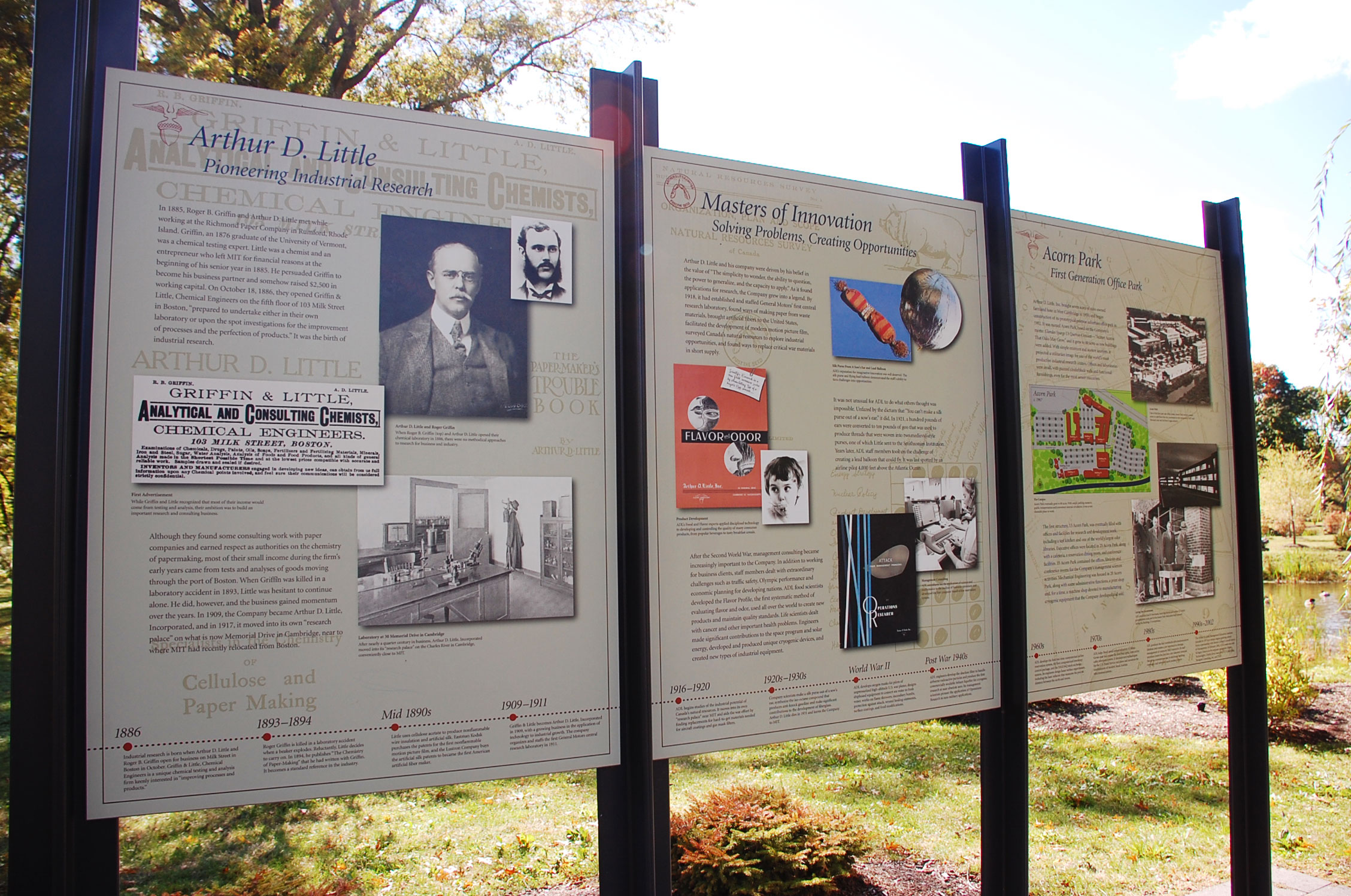
A memorial sits on-site today to commemorate Arthur D. Little and the impact they had on the world.

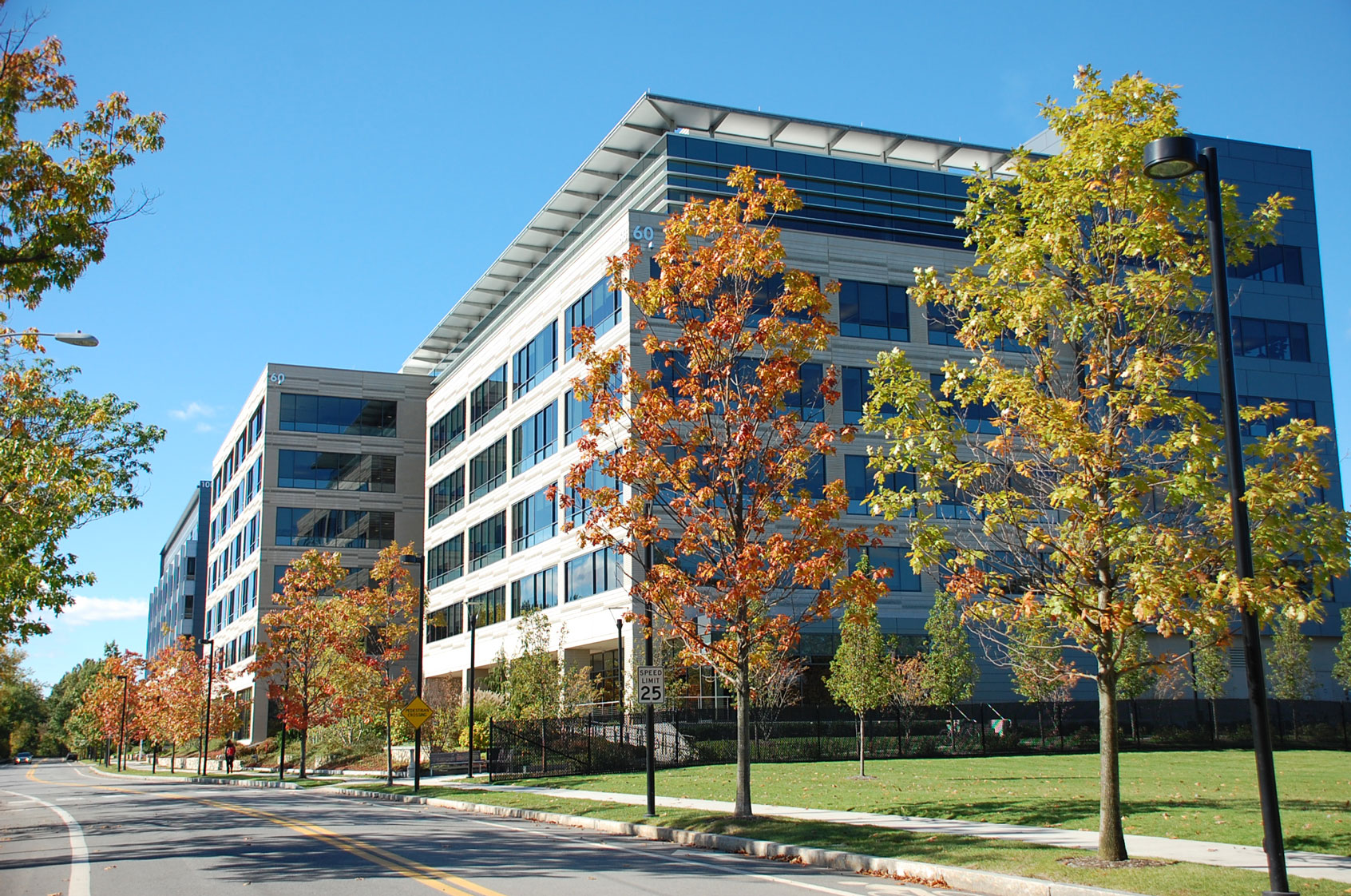
Green space, walking trails, and bike paths fill the Park.

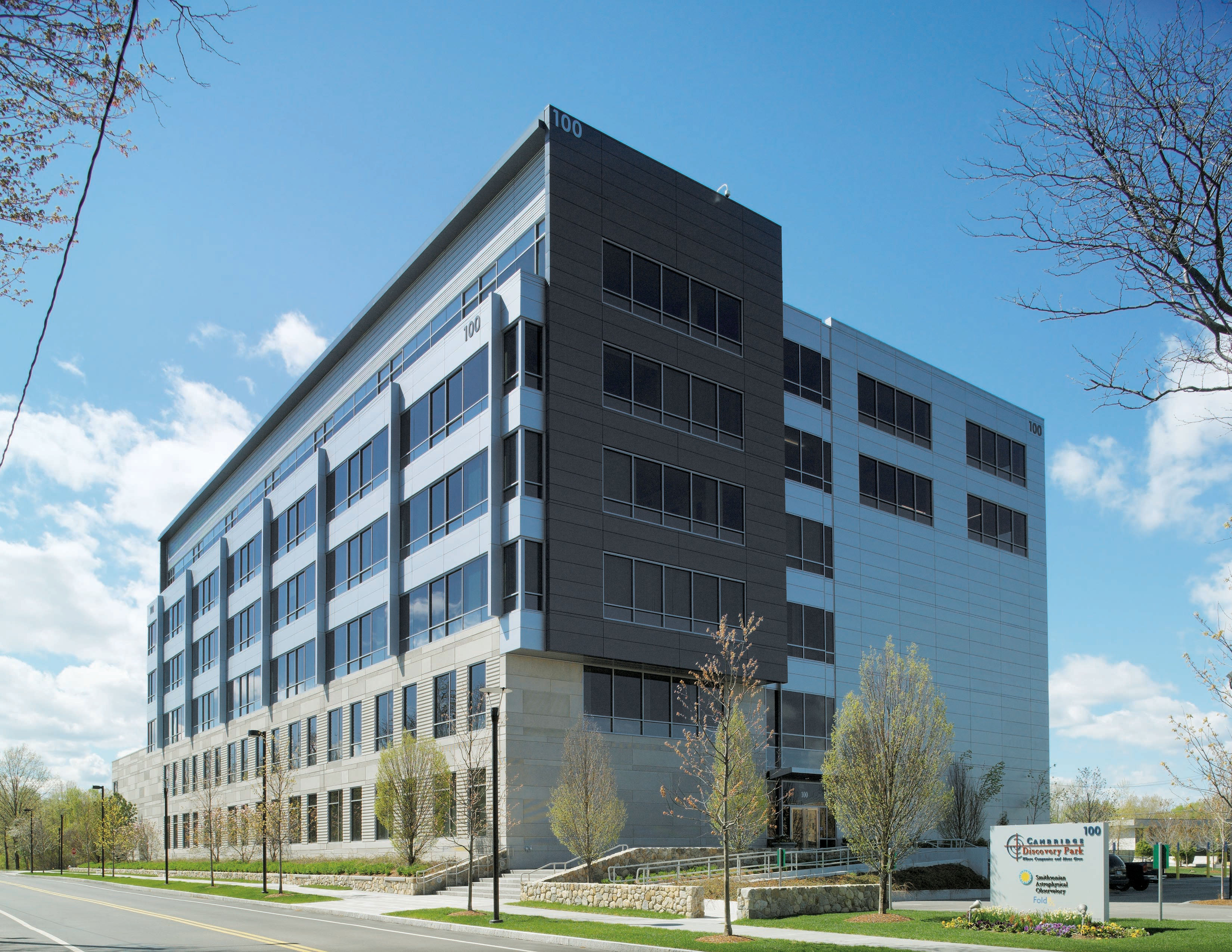
Building 100 of Cambridge Discovery Park, home to The Smithsonian Institution Astrophysical Observatory

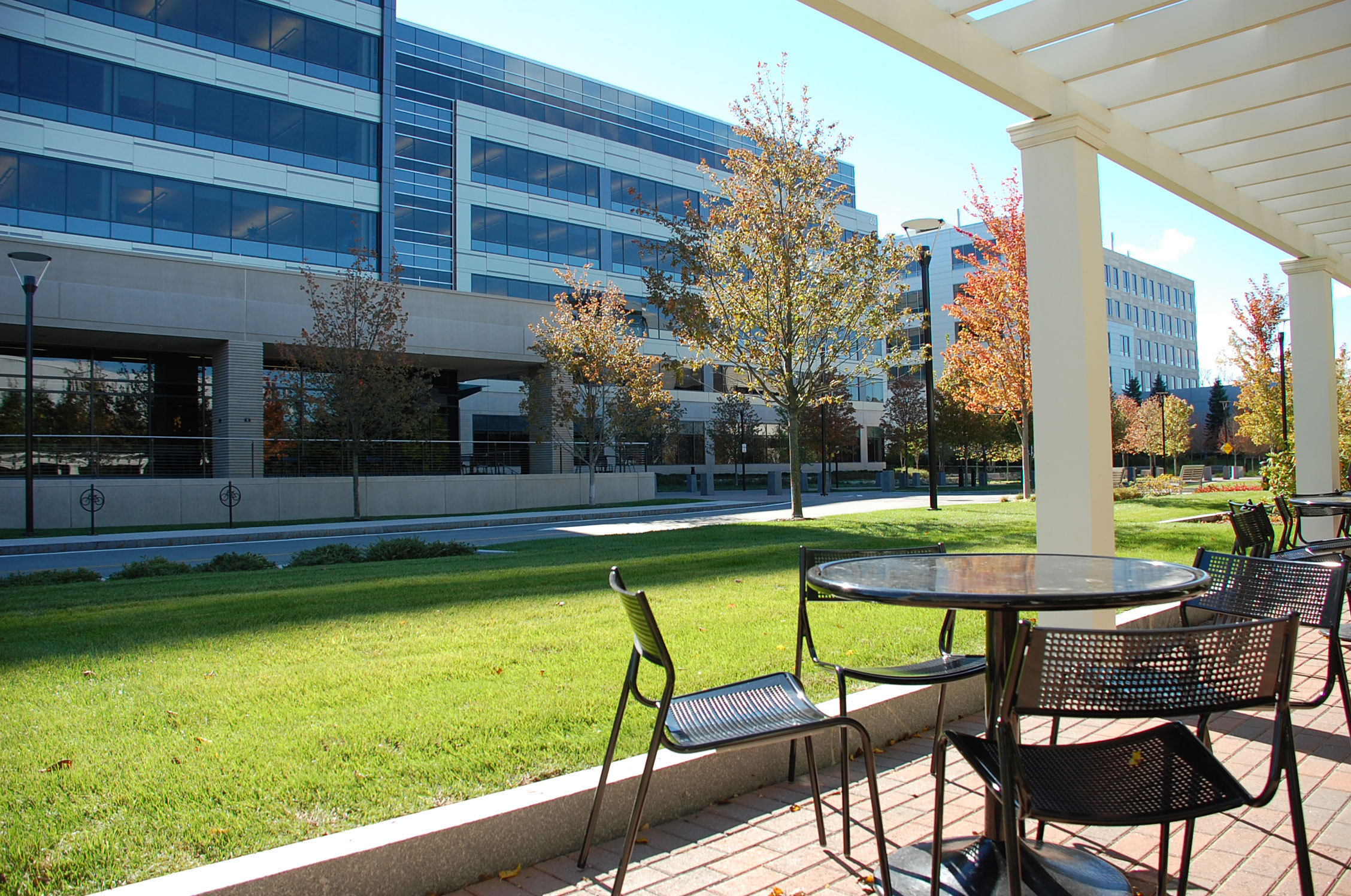
Green space and outdoor seating on campus

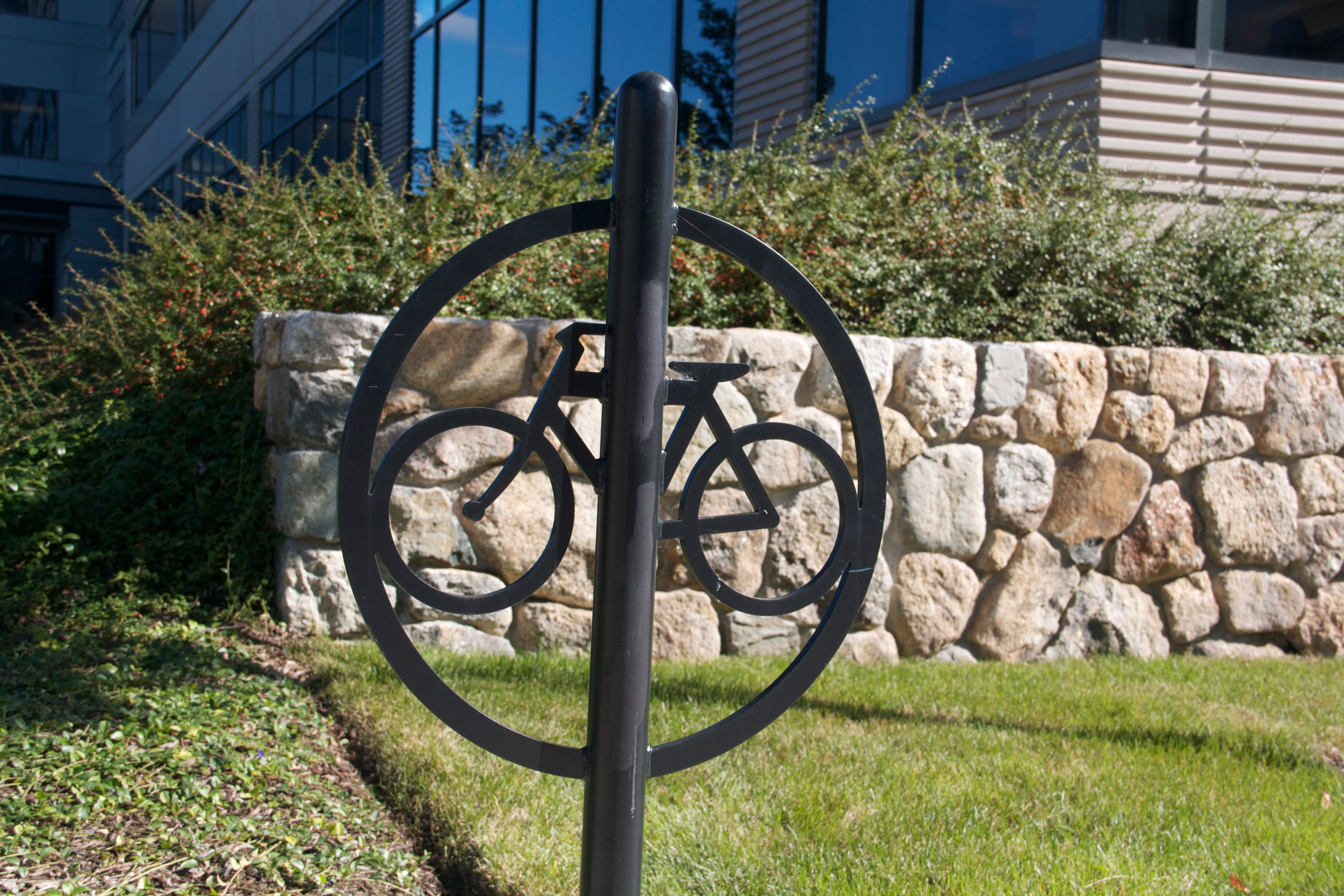
Sustainable practices throughout the campus

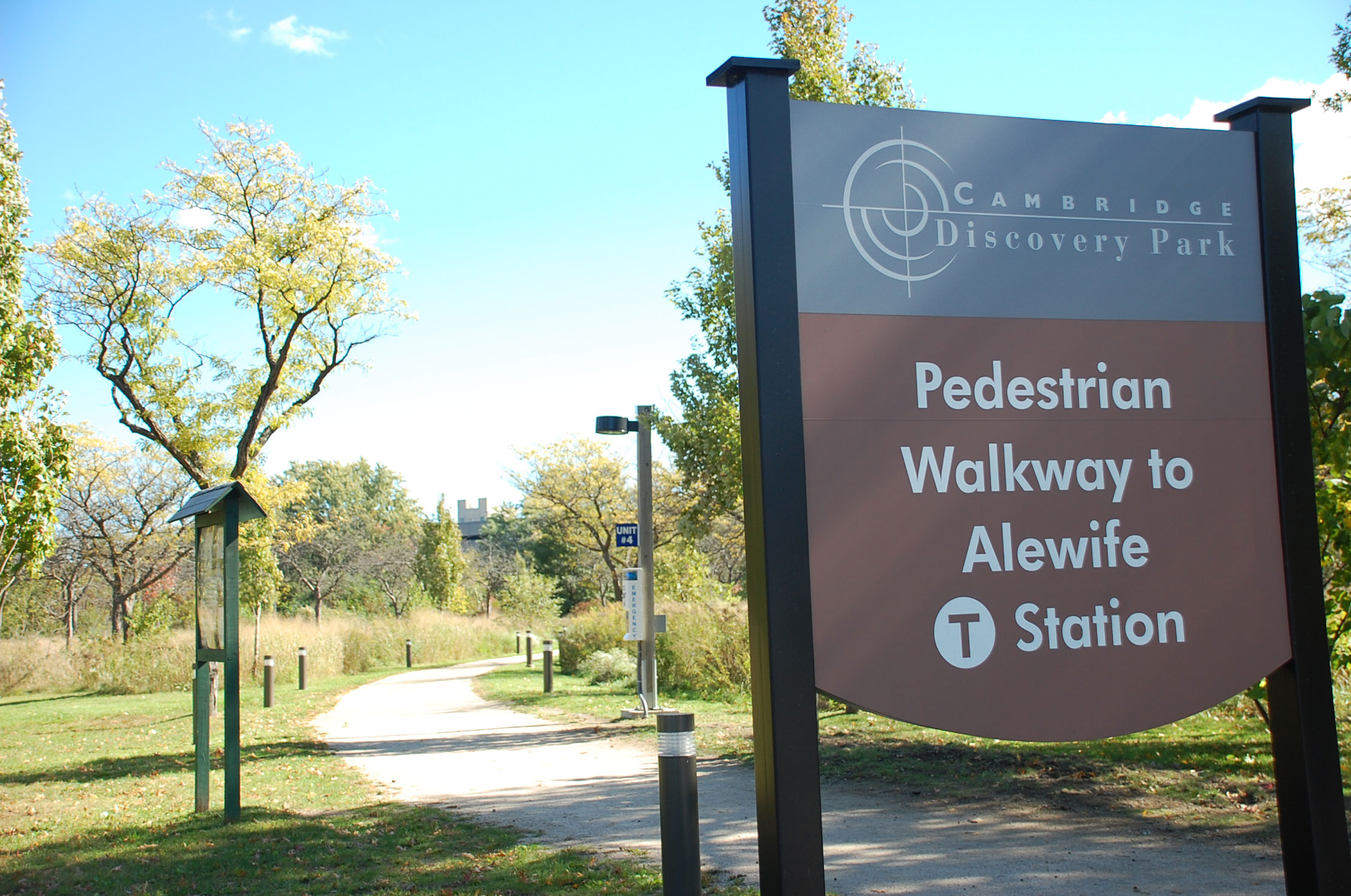
The campus is in walking distance to the Alewife MBTA Station.

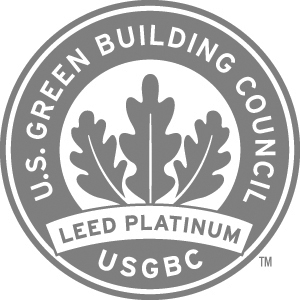
CDP has earned a LEED-Platinum certification from the USGBC.

== Honors and awards ==
- In 2008, the American Council of Engineering Companies of Massachusetts (ACEC MA) awarded Cambridge Discovery Park a Silver Award Certificate of Merit for Engineering Excellence.
- In 2011, the City of Cambridge awarded Cambridge Discovery Park the GoGreen Award for outstanding storm water design and efficiency.
- In 2011, City of Cambridge Historic Commission. awarded a Certification of Preservation Merit for the interpretative signage that chronicles the history of Acorn Park and features the original 1953 cornerstone of the initial Arthur D. Little building.

== Conflicts with neighboring apartment buildings ==
On September 22, 2021, locked gates were constructed surrounding this park, greatly limiting its bicycle and pedestrian accessibility.
