= William J. J. Gordon =

American psychologist (1919–2003)

William J. J. Gordon (September 9, 1919 – June 30, 2003) was an inventor and psychologist. He is recognized as the co-creator of a problem solving approach called synectics, which he developed along with George M. Prince while working in the Invention Design Group of Arthur D. Little.

Gordon also held numerous United States patents for various products and services, including a rotatable multiple tool support unit (No. 2,743,746 – May 1, 1956), a catamenial device (No. 2,879,769 – March 31, 1959), an impact tool (No. 2,974,651 – March 14, 1961), artificial snow (No. 3,020,811 – February 13, 1962), a dispenser (No. 3,035,299 – May 22, 1962), a boat fender (No. 3,055,335 – September 25, 1962), an apparatus for continuous restaurant counter place mats (No. 3,092,045 – June 4, 1963), a lipstick container (No. 3,737,241 – June 5, 1973), and an animal track teaching method (No. 4,204,705 – May 27, 1980).

Built in 1843 by lexicographer and dictionary author Joseph Emerson Worcester on what was originally part of the Vassall-Craigie Estate, Gordon’s 7,150-square-foot, 15-room home on Brattle Street in Cambridge, Massachusetts was purchased by London art historian Margaret Koster and her husband, Joseph Koerner, in 2006.

Gordon attended the University of Pennsylvania in 1937 and 1938, but according to the university archives, did not receive a degree. He was also the youngest son of Nathan H. Gordon, the motion picture executive.
