= Arthur D. Little Inc., Building =

- Arthur D. Little, Inc., Building
- U.S. National Register of Historic Places
- U.S. National Historic Landmark
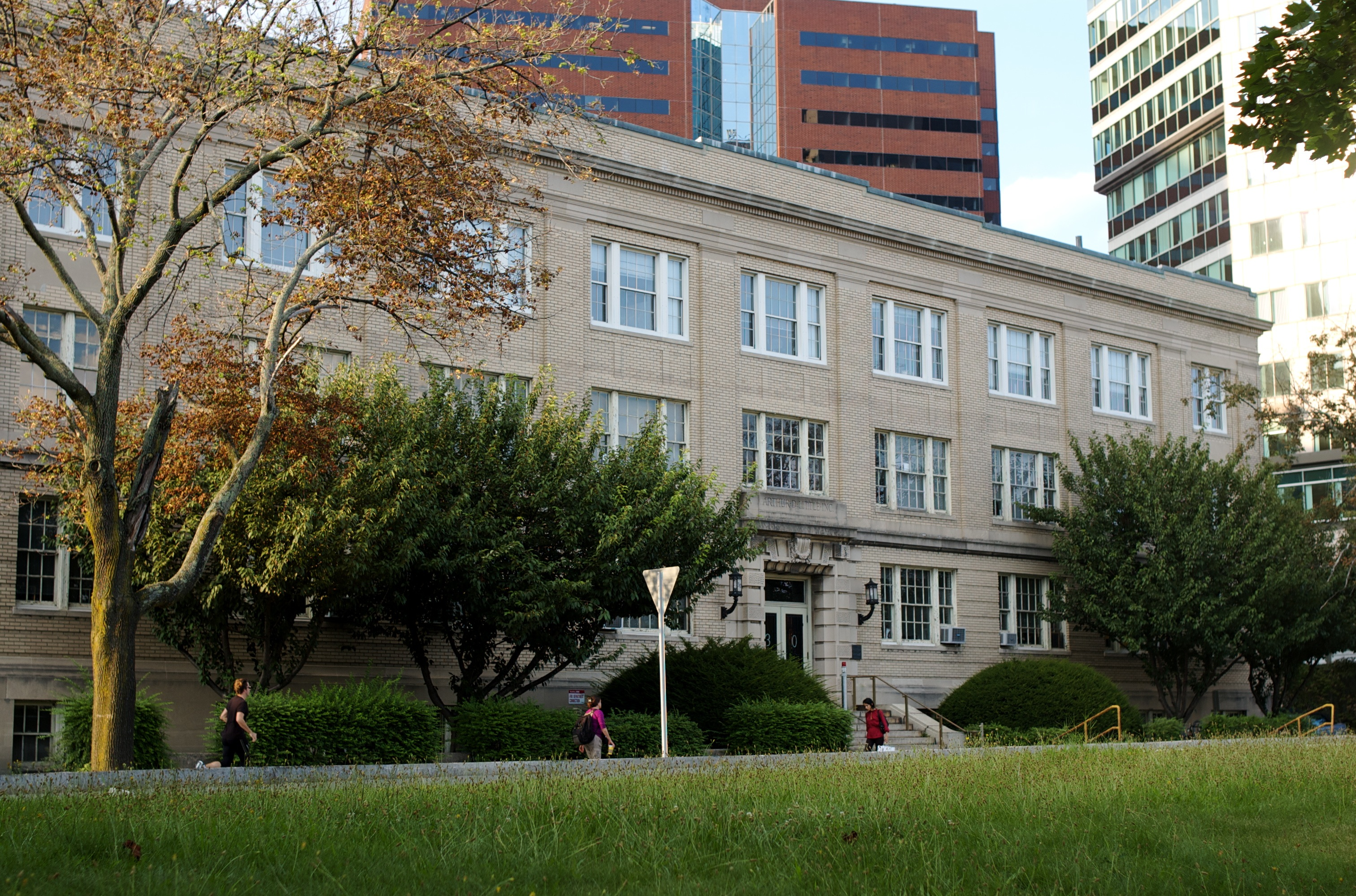

- Location within Massachusetts Location within the United States
- Location: 30 Memorial Drive; Cambridge, Massachusetts
- Coordinates: 42°21′40.1″N 71°4′55.9″W
- Built: 1917
- NRHP reference No.: 76001970

Significant dates
- Added to NRHP: December 8, 1976
- Designated NHL: December 8, 1976

The Arthur D. Little Inc., Building is a National Historic Landmark at 30 Memorial Drive in Cambridge, Massachusetts. The building was constructed in 1917 for the Arthur D. Little Company alongside the campus of the Massachusetts Institute of Technology and now serves as headquarters for the dean of the MIT Sloan School of Management and other Sloan administrative groups.

The Arthur D. Little Company was founded in 1886 by Arthur Dehon Little, and was originally located on Milk Street in Boston. The three-story brick building on Memorial Drive was constructed by the company to meet increasing demand for laboratory space, and is an architecturally unexceptional commercial structure. The building was declared a National Historic Landmark for its association with the Little company, the first business to be established as a consulting laboratory in the nation. Prior to its founding, individual businesses established their own research laboratories to make technological innovations. Little, and his partner William H. Walker, were among the first academically oriented researchers to create a consulting laboratory whose services could be hired by businesses. At first focused on the chemistry of cellulose and its uses in textiles and paper, the company was by 1909 the largest consulting industrial laboratory in the nation, and worked a wide array of research disciplines. Little was an early advocate of the importance of technological innovation, recognizing its importance in maintaining commercial success. He ran the company until his death in 1935, and willed his shares to MIT.

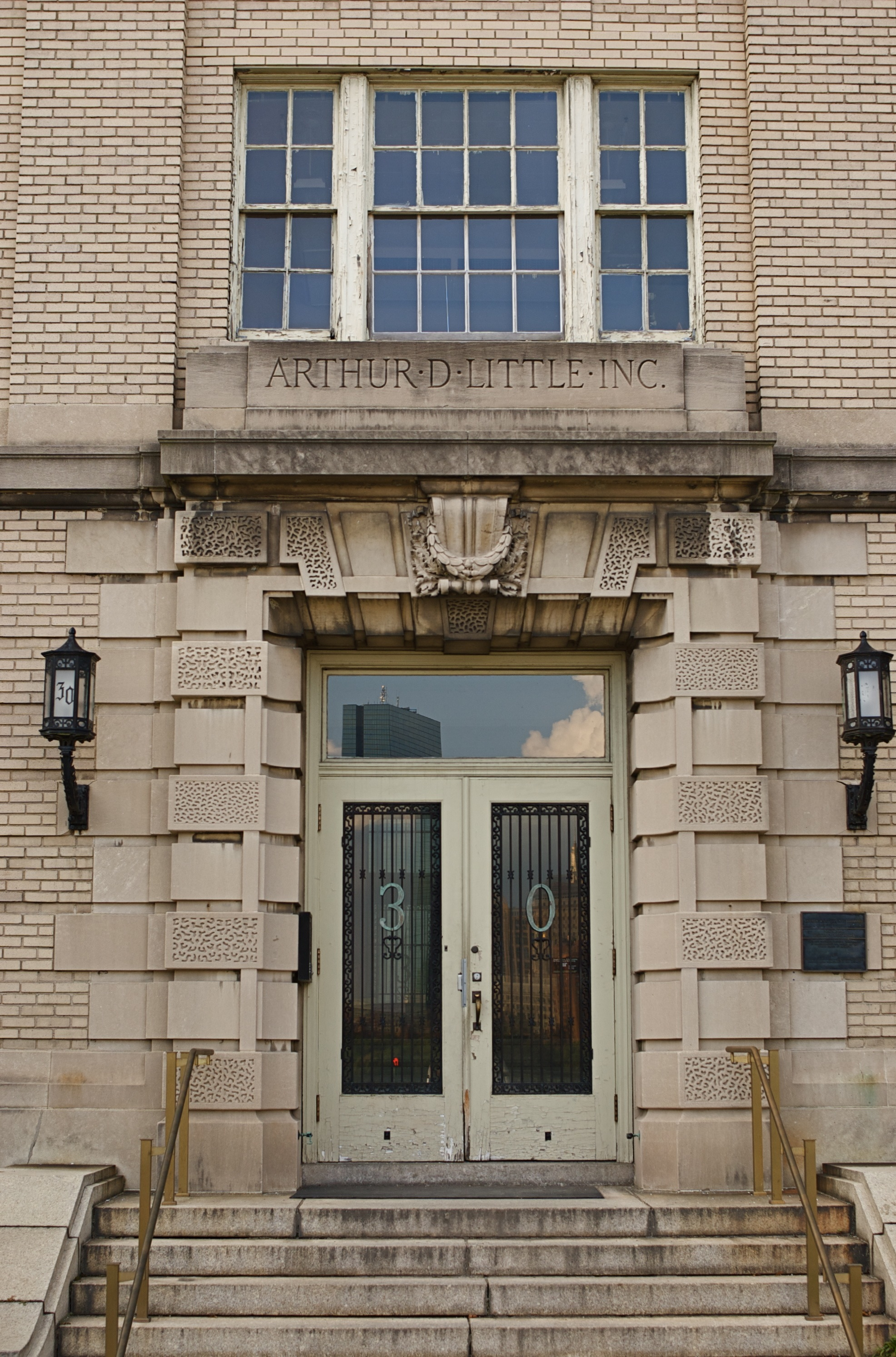
Detail

The building was added to the National Register of Historic Places in 1976.

== See also ==
- List of National Historic Landmarks in Massachusetts
- National Register of Historic Places listings in Cambridge, Massachusetts
