= The Bulfinch Companies =

American real estate firm

The Bulfinch Companies, Inc.
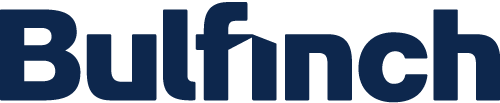
- Company type: Private
- Industry: Real Estate
- Founded: 1936
- Founder: Samuel W. Poorvu
- Headquarters: Boston, Massachusetts, U.S.
- Key people: Eric Schlager, CEO, Robert Schlager, President, S. Lawrence Schlager, Chairman Emeritus
- Products: Property management, property development
- Website: bulfinch.com

The Bulfinch Companies, Inc. is an American real estate firm headquartered in Boston, Massachusetts. Since its inception, Bulfinch has "developed, acquired, and re-positioned in excess of $4 billion in commercial real estate assets." Bulfinch owns and operates nearly 4 million square feet of property, primarily centered in New England.

== History ==
Bulfinch was founded in 1936 by Samuel W. Poorvu, a Lithuanian immigrant who began his career as a bricklayer. Poorvu started a small company in Boston building and developing Post Offices, which consequently dubbed him as "the Post Office King of America" by the Wall Street Journal for his role in developing over 100 postal facilities nationwide for the United States Postal Service.

Bulfinch is currently in its third generation of management. Bulfinch is owned and has been continuously operated by the Schlager family.

== Acquisitions ==
=== Osborn Triangle ===
Located adjacent to MIT's campus in Kendall Square, Bulfinch, in partnership with MIT and Harrison Street Real Estate Capital, acquired three buildings: 610 Main Street North, 700 Main Street and 1 Portland Street "for 1.1 Billion Dollars". The three properties feature 677,000 square feet of lab, office and retail space, with a parking garage that includes 650 spaces. Key tenants include: Pfizer, Novartis, Lab Central as well as restaurants Sulmona, Café Luna Revela, and Boston Burger.

=== 10 Brookline Place ===
Bulfinch acquired 10 Brookline Place in 2018 for 153 million dollars. The property consists of six floors with a total of 173,000 square feet of office space with 240 parking spaces available on 1.7 acres of land.

=== Lifetime Center ===
In July 2012, Bulfinch acquired the 300,000 square foot Atrium Mall in Chestnut Hill, Massachusetts from Simon Property Group, with plans to re-position it as a mixed-use medical office property, partially demolishing it, and then rebuilding and renovating it. The Lifetime Center reopened in Fall 2017 with Lifetime Fitness and Dana–Farber Cancer Institute as anchor stores.

=== The Harvard Square Post Office ===
Samuel Poorvu originally developed the Harvard Square United States Post Office located in Cambridge, Massachusetts in 1954. This facility was redeveloped in 2000 by Bulfinch.

=== The Polaroid Building ===
The building was the "first modern industrial structure in Cambridge, Massachusetts" and was designed by Shepley Bulfinch in 1938 for B B Chemical Company. The building was acquired by Polaroid Corporation and was used as their corporate headquarters for some time. The building is listed on the National Register of Historic Places since 1982. Bulfinch acquired the property in 2000. The Information Technology group of Harvard University (HUIT) is currently the sole tenant.

=== Cambridge Discovery Park ===
Cambridge Discovery Park is located on the site of the former Arthur D. Little Company headquarters in Cambridge, Massachusetts. It is an 820,000 SF master-planned development with multiple LEED certified buildings. It is home to Forrester Research world headquarters and the Harvard-Smithsonian Astrophysical Observatory. Siemens AG also leases space in the property.

== Awards ==
Bulfinch was awarded the "Distinguished Real Estate Award" by the National Association of Industrial & Office Properties in 2007. Bullfinch has also been awarded commendations by the Mayor of Cambridge, Massachusetts. The City of Cambridge, Massachusetts awarded Bulfinch the Certificate of Preservation Merit. Bullfinch received LEED Gold Certifications by the USGBC.

Several Bulfinch properties have earned the United States Environmental Protection Agency's Energy Star certification. Banker & Tradesman has identified several Bulfinch sites as "Hot Properties". The American Council of Engineering awarded Bulfinch a silver award for Cambridge Discovery Park in 2008. Bulfinch received recognition at the 2011 GoGreen Awards for "their work in reducing storm water runoff and improving water quality".

== See also ==
- Pyramid Management Group
- Brookfield Properties
