= Kenan Sahin =

Turkish-born American scientist

- Born: Turkey
- Citizenship: United States
- Education: MIT Sloan School of Management
- Occupation: Businessman

Kenan Eyüp Şahin, (commonly known as Kenan Sahin) is a Turkish-born American scientist and entrepreneur. He is the founder, President and the Chief Technology Officer of TIAX LLC in Lexington, Massachusetts. He is also the founder and CEO of CAMX Power which formerly was a division of TIAX LLC and in May 2014, became a separate company.

== Early life and education ==
He was born in Aydın, Turkey. His father, Eyüp Şahin, was an industrialist and a member of the Turkish parliament. He completed elementary school in Aydın, graduated from Robert Academy (middle school) in Istanbul, Turkey. He started high school at Robert College but completed it at Inglewood High School in California. He then started his college studies at Robert College (now the Boğaziçi University) and then transferred to MIT as a junior to finish his BS. He completed his PhD at the MIT School of Industrial Management.

== Business career ==
The early years of Dr. Sahin's entrepreneurial career overlapped with the final years of his academic career which began at the Massachusetts Institute of Technology and continued at MIT with interleaved periods at Robert College of Istanbul (now the Boğaziçi University) Harvard University, and the University of Massachusetts Amherst. He has global patents and numerous academic publications.

In 1982, Dr. Sahin founded Kenan Systems with a $1,000 personal investment, as part of his outreach activities while at MIT. The company grew to become a world leader in telecommunications software, creating nearly 1,000 professional jobs. Dr. Sahin was named the Ernst & Young New England Entrepreneur of the Year in 1998.

In 1999, Dr. Sahin sold Kenan Systems to Lucent Technologies/Bell Laboratories for $1.5 billion in a stock swap when the Lucent stock was trading at $50 a share. Subsequent to the sale, accepting a two-year offer from Lucent/Bell Labs, he became Vice President of Software Technology at Bell Labs, a member of the managing group of Bell Labs and then the President of Lucent's Software Products Group, managing 4,500 people. The same year he made a major unrestricted gift to MIT, the largest ever until then, which MIT allocated to its School of Humanities and Social Science, also endowing the Dean of the same school.

Dr. Sahin left Lucent/Bell Labs in early 2001 to return to Boston and later to start TIAX LLC. He significantly expanded TIAX in early 2002 by acquiring assets and hiring staff from the Technology and Innovation unit of Arthur D. Little, Inc. which had come to an end.

In 2003, the World Economic Forum named Dr. Sahin one of its 40 Technology Pioneers. He received the New England Business and Technology's first "Circle of Excellence" award in 2004. In 2006, he was given the Golden Door Award by the International Institute of Boston in recognition of his achievements as both an entrepreneur and an academic. In 2007, TIAX was recognized as one of the Global Growth companies by the World Economic Forum, and Dr. Sahin was invited to Davos-East held in Dalian, China to address Innovation. In 2010, he was awarded the Ellis Island Medal of Honor and this recognition was entered into the US Congressional records. In 2015, he was given an honorary doctorate in engineering by Boğaziçi University in Istanbul, Turkey.

== Board memberships ==
He serves on the Board of MIT (life member), Council of Competitiveness Executive Committee, the Board of Robert College of Istanbul and the Board of Overseers of the Boston Symphony Orchestra ( Emeritus). He served on the Board Argonne National Laboratory, National Electrical Manufacturers Association Board in Washington, DC, on the MIT Energy Initiative Advisory Board, on the Boards of Museum of Fine Arts, Boston, AFS Intercultural Programs, and as a team member for the Center for the Study of the Presidency and Congress.

== Personal life ==
Dr. Sahin currently resides in Massachusetts.
