= TIAX =

TIAX LLC
- Predecessor: Arthur D. Little's Technology & Innovation business
- Founded: 2002
- Founder: Kenan Sahin (president)
- Headquarters: Lexington, Massachusetts
- Website: www.tiaxllc.com

TIAX LLC is a laboratory-based technology development company that takes early stage inventions, and in its labs, transforms them into technology-enabled products ready for spin-out and commercialization. TIAX is headquartered in Lexington, MA.

== History ==
In 2002, Kenan Sahin formed TIAX LLC, which acquired the assets, contracts, and staff of Arthur D. Little's Technology & Innovation business for $16.5 million. A Turkish-born MIT professor turned technologist, Kenan Sahin is the founder and President of TIAX.

TIAX is ISO 9001:2015 certified and maintains a US Government Contract Audit Agency compliant financial accounting system. TIAX actively participates in the Small Business Innovative Research (SBIR) program and is a successful commercialization entity in the U. S. SBIR community.

TIAX has received patents for its lithium-ion battery technology. TIAX's advanced lithium-ion battery and battery component development facility is one of the largest independent development environments in the United States. In 2009, TIAX was selected for negotiation of an award from the U.S. Department of Energy (DOE) for up to $2.36 million for a project "aimed at understanding and preventing internal short circuits in lithium ion cells."

In 2002, TIAX was the recipient of two prestigious Good Design Awards from The Chicago Athenaeum: Museum of Design and Architecture. The awards recognize TIAX's innovation in product design for its clients, Nuvera Fuel Cells and Tandem Medical. For Nuvera, TIAX designed the shell for the company's 1 kW Hydrogen Power Module (H2PM), a fuel cell-based power source that uses proprietary technology to generate electricity.

== Noteworthy Projects ==
=== Integrated Aircrew Ensemble ===
TIAX was awarded the multi-year Integrated Aircrew Ensemble (IAE) contract by the United States Air Force. This IAE program, which was competitively won and is an SBIR Phase III activity, derives from successful SBIR Phase I and Phase II efforts. With an initial focus on ejection seat aircraft, TIAX is leading a multi-company team in the development and verification of a neck-down ensemble that protects against acceleration, cold water immersion, chem/bio agents, and flame while concurrently improving cockpit compatibility and aircrew well-being. TIAX licensed this technology to two aircrew flight equipment companies – Mustang Survival and RFD Beaufort, who are team members on the IAE contract. Led by TIAX, the team of TIAX, RFDB, and Mustang Survival was recently awarded an SBIR Phase III contract to develop, verify, and deliver IAE to the U.S. Air Force – first at low rate initial production (LRIP) and then full rate production (FRP).

=== Netzsch Calorimeter ===
In 2009, the Netzsch Analysing and Testing Business Unit acquired TIAX accelerating rate calorimeters (ARC) and automatic pressure tracking adiabatic calorimeters (APTAC). These products were merged with NETZSCH's worldwide Thermal Analysis business.

=== Samuel Adams Beer Glass ===
Food reformulation is one of TIAX's technology development projects. In February 2007, TIAX developed a new type of pint glass for the Boston Beer Company, which brews Samuel Adams. TIAX put all its findings into a 300-page report for Koch, who took it to half-a-dozen glassmakers around the world to create prototypes. German glassware manufacturer Rastal shaped a glass that best met the criteria developed by TIAX. The glass is designed to bring out the flavor of a Samuel Adams Boston Lager and features a curvier shape, thinner walls, a beaded rim and outward-turning lip. The neck-and-lip design helps retain the hop aroma and sustain the head. The bead inside the rim creates turbulence to release flavor and aroma as beer enters the mouth. A laser-etched nucleation site within the glass creates bubbles for constant aroma release.

=== Full Fuel Cycle Analysis ===
TIAX California assessed the carbon intensity of KiOR's renewable gasoline and diesel fuels from biomass feedstocks.

== Noteworthy Publications ==
=== Canadian Oil Sands Study ===
TIAX California studied the greenhouse gas (GHG) emissions and energy use of Canadian oil sands versus conventional oil sources in a 2009 study for the Alberta Energy Research Institute (AERI). Jacobs Consultancy Canada Inc. and TIAX LLC conducted the research and authored the two studies. TIAX's study has been referenced and cited in assessing the environmental impact of oil sands, garnering press attention through WSJ.

=== Full Fuel Cycle Assessment ===
In 2007, TIAX supported the State of California's landmark Global Warming Solutions Act by assessing the market rollout and adoption of multiple alternative fuels. TIAX assisted the California Energy Commission in developing an alternative fuels plan for California by performing a life cycle analysis of energy use and emissions from alternative and conventional fuels and technologies. The resulting storylines were incorporated into the California Assembly Bill 1007 Alternative Fuels Plan to guide the increased use of alternative fuels in the state.
