= Royal Little =

American businessman (1896–1989)

- Born: March 1, 1896; Wakefield, Massachusetts, US
- Died: January 10, 1989 (aged 92); Nassau, Bahamas
- Known for: Founder of Textron

Royal Little (March 1, 1896 – January 10, 1989) was an American business executive, founder and chair of Textron.

Little graduated from Noble & Greenough School in 1915 and from Harvard University in 1919, despite having been on academic probation. He soon began working for various textile firms, before founding Special Yarns Corporation in 1923 on $10,000 (equivalent to $189,000 in 2025) in borrowed money. He changed the name to Textron in 1944. Little spent much of his time acquiring other textile firms, and was successful in his efforts. By 1947, the company reported sales of $125 million (equivalent to $1.4 billion in 2025).

By the 1950s, realizing that the textile industry was not consistently viable, Little began to acquire firms in other industries, beginning the modern conglomerate. Throughout the decade, Textron acquired assets in pneumatic tools, antennas, plastics, plywood, aluminum, helicopters, chain saws, and leather, among others.

Little retired in 1960, at which time Textron was one of the top 100 companies in the US. Other corporations, following Textron's model, attempted to diversify their holdings in industry. In his retirement, he wrote How to Lose $100,000,000 and Other Valuable Advice in 1979.

Little died at his home in the Bahamas in 1989. At his request, there was no funeral.

Royal Little was the nephew of Arthur Dehon Little, the founder of Boston's Arthur D. Little management consulting firm.
