= B B Chemical Company =

- U.S. National Register of Historic Places
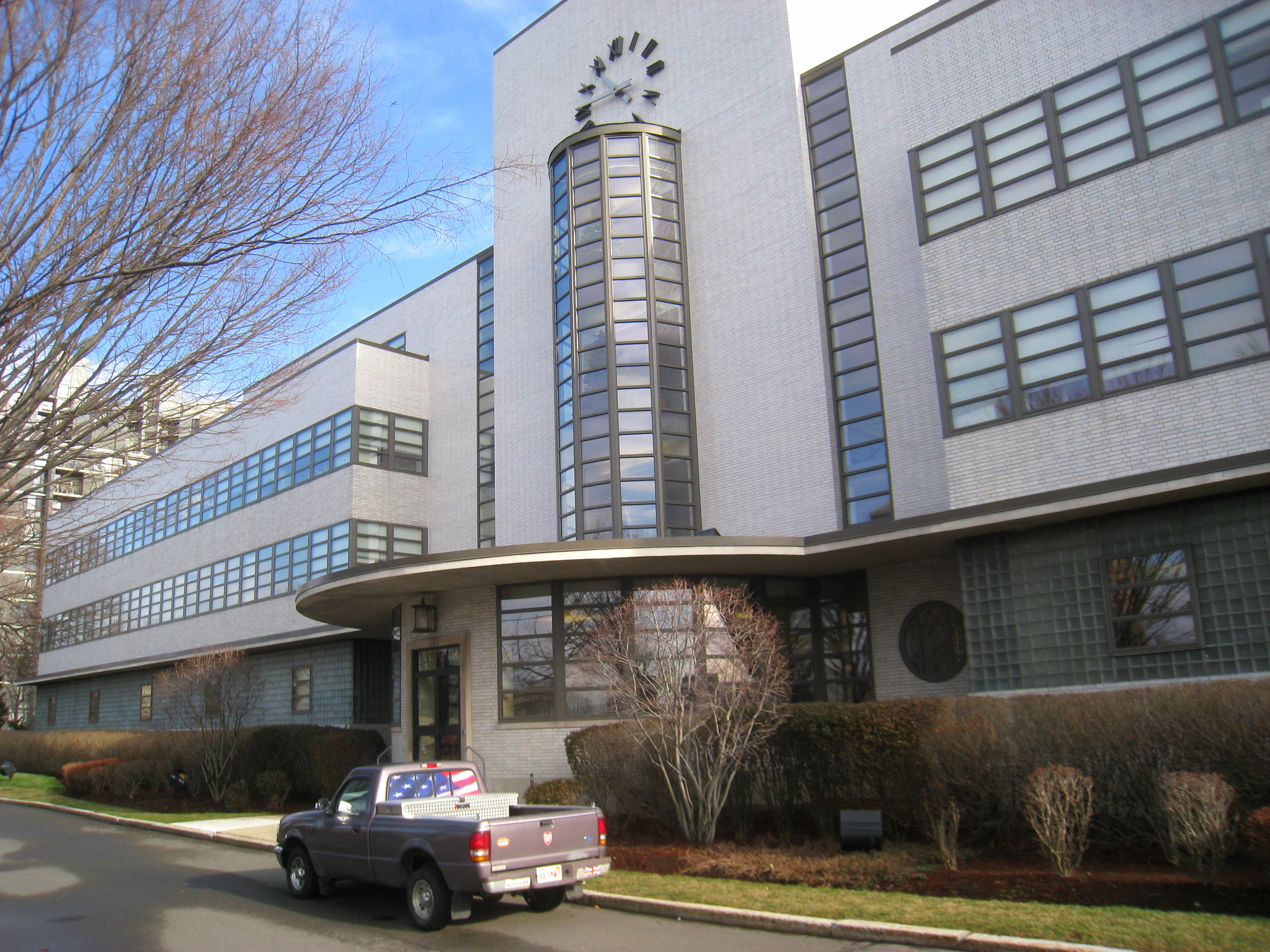

- Location within Massachusetts Location within the United States
- Location: 784/780 Memorial Drive, Cambridge, Massachusetts
- Coordinates: 42°21′35″N 71°06′55″W
- Built: 1937
- Architect: Coolidge, Shepley, Bulfinch & Abbott
- Architectural style: Streamline Moderne
- MPS: Cambridge MRA
- NRHP reference No.: 82001918
- Added to NRHP: April 13, 1982

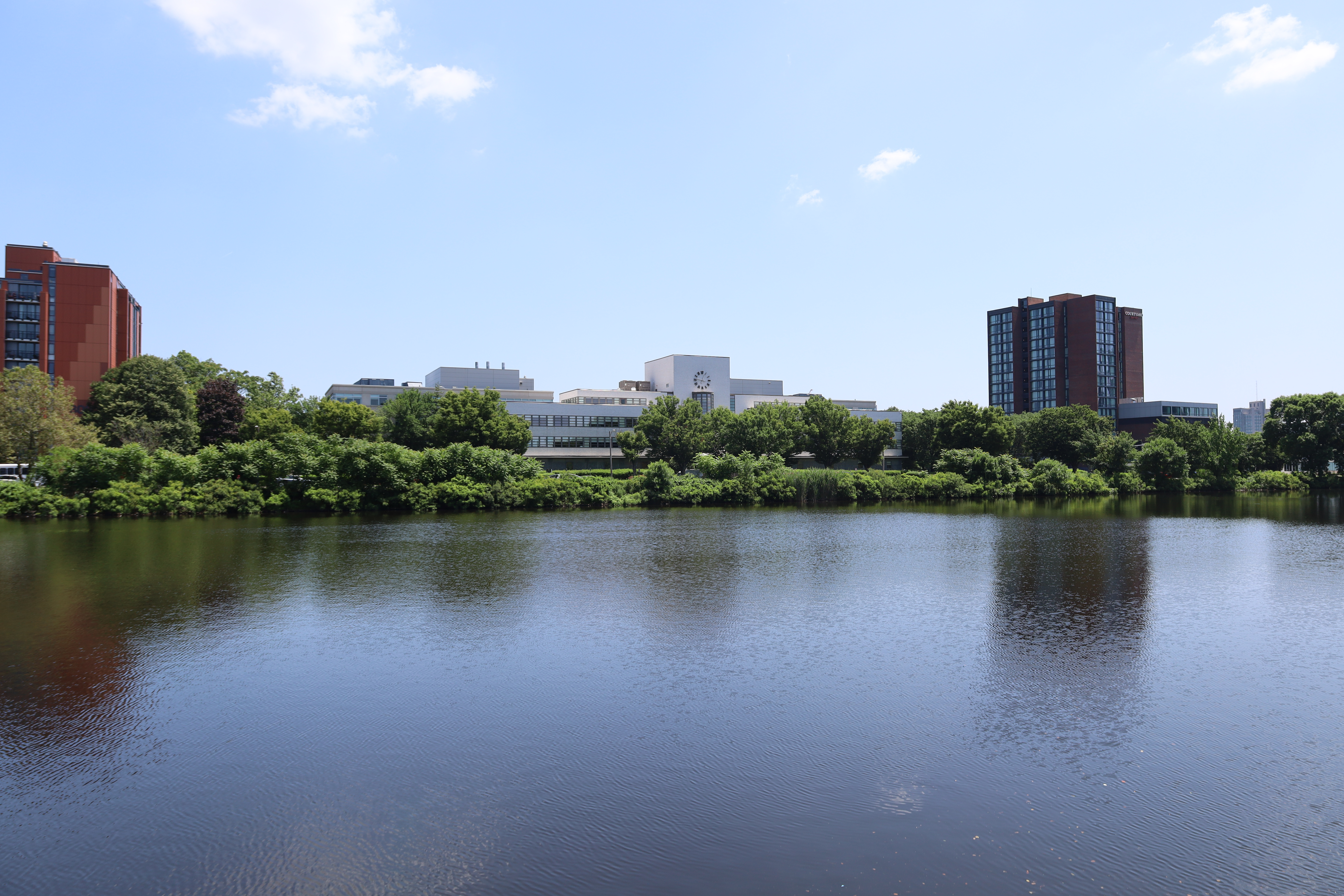
The building from across the Charles River in 2023

The B B Chemical Company is an historic office and industrial building at 784 Memorial Drive in Cambridge, Massachusetts. It was built in 1937 for the Boston Blacking Company, an adhesive manufacturer whose most famous brand name was Bostik, to a design by Coolidge, Shepley, Bulfinch & Abbott, and is a prominent local example of Streamline Moderne architecture. From 1979 to 1996, it served as the headquarters of the Polaroid Corporation. The building was added to the National Register of Historic Places in 1982 under the incorrect name "B and B Chemical Company". It is now owned by The Bulfinch Companies of Needham, Massachusetts.

== Description and history ==
The former B B Chemical Company building is located in the Cambridgeport neighborhood of Cambridge, on the east side of Memorial Drive between River Street and Pleasant Street Extension. It is a basically rectangular structure, with a four-story central section flanked by three-storey wings. It has a frame of steel and concrete, and is mainly faced in buff brick. The central section is recessed from the wings, but a projecting cornice on the wings extends over the recess area to provide a curved canopy over the entrance. The central part of the center section is even taller, with a projecting rounded window bay topped by a clock face. The wings are symmetrical, with the ground floor composed mainly of glass blocks interspersed with regularly spaced horizontal windows. The upper floors are defined by long bands of horizontal windows.

The building was designed by Coolidge, Shepley, Bulfinch & Abbott and built in 1937 for the B B Chemical Company, a subsidiary of the United Shoe Machinery Corporation since 1929. In 1946, it described itself as supplying "adhesives and related compounds for the shoe leather, aircraft, rubber clothing and shipbuilding industries". The facility, which include a more simply designed second building behind this one, produced adhesives used in the shoe manufacturing process at other plants. It served as the headquarters for the Polaroid Corporation starting in 1979. It is now owned by The Bulfinch Companies, and is occupied by Harvard University's Information Technology group (HUIT).

== See also ==
- National Register of Historic Places listings in Cambridge, Massachusetts
