= Peter Scott-Morgan =

English-American organizational theorist and robotics expert (1958–2022)

- Born: Peter Bowman Scott; 19 April 1958; Wandsworth, London, England
- Died: 15 June 2022 (aged 64); Torquay, Devon, England
- Education: Imperial College London
- Spouse: Francis Morgan (m. 2005)

Peter Bowman Scott-Morgan (né Scott; 19 April 1958 – 15 June 2022) was an English-American organizational theorist, author, and expert in robotics. He had motor neurone disease and was known for his efforts to extend his life by becoming what he called a human cyborg. In 2020 he was the subject of Channel 4's documentary Peter: The Human Cyborg.

== Early life and career ==
Peter Scott was born on 19 April 1958 in Wandsworth, London. He was educated at King's College School, Wimbledon, where he became head boy of the junior school. He had a BSc in computing science and a PhD (1986) from Imperial College London which was the first doctorate awarded by a robotics department in a British university. His thesis was "A technical and managerial methodology for robotisation: an approach to cost-effective introduction of robotics technology into industry with particular reference to flexible assembly systems". According to his own website, he was a Chartered Engineer (CEng) and Chartered IT Professional (CITP).

He helped develop new techniques in management consultancy while working at Arthur D. Little and teaching at the London Business School, Rotterdam School of Management and the Hult International Business School in Boston. He published his first book, The Robotics Revolution, in 1984. According to his website, he wrote on methods of identifying the nature and behaviour of complex social systems, and their risks and his techniques were widely adopted by managers, academics, consultants, and others. He published analyses of the ways in which the world economy and international communities behave, and ways of resolving the problems that arise, with an increasing focus on addressing global threats. His other books include The Unwritten Rules of the Game describing a radical new approach to diagnosing culture and incentives within organisations (1994), and The Reality of Our Global Future (2012).

== Adopting technology ==
After being diagnosed with amyotrophic lateral sclerosis in 2017, Scott-Morgan underwent a series of operations which allowed him to control, through technological innovation, the muscles, and organs which were wasting as a result of the condition. To become what he called a human cyborg, he adopted procedures using technology to bypass his natural body systems, including a full laryngectomy, and laser eye surgery to optimise his sight at a suitable distance from his computer screen. He also developed an avatar of his face to allow him to indicate a greater range of expressions. He became able "to operate a computer using eye-tracking technology, stand up using his wheelchair, and demonstrate emotions through the avatar he created. His disease caused his muscles to atrophy, so he eventually needed a catheter and colostomy bag ... as well as surgery on his larynx to keep saliva from filling his lungs."

The transformations were shown in a Channel 4 documentary, Peter: The Human Cyborg, in 2020, and Scott-Morgan wrote a book about the experience, Peter 2.0.

== Personal life ==
Scott-Morgan and his husband Francis, né Morgan, became a couple in 1979, jointly adopted their merged surname in 1990, and entered a civil partnership on 21 December 2005, being the first couple in England to do so, on the day it became legally possible. Nine years later, at 8.30 am on 10 December 2014, they were among the first couples in England to retrospectively convert their partnership to a marriage, and because the marriages were retrospective to the time and date of civil partnership, they are listed as the first gay marriage in England. They lived in Torquay, Devon.

From 2018, Scott-Morgan was a trustee of the Motor Neurone Disease Association. He and his husband also set up a foundation, "Right to Thrive", campaigning for additional funding, changes to health guidelines, and the greater use of technology to support those with the disease.

== Death ==
He died on 15 June 2022, aged 64, from complications of motor neurone disease.

== Selected publications ==
- Scott-Morgan, Peter (2021). Peter 2.0. Michael Joseph. ISBN 978-0241447093.
- Scott-Morgan, Peter (2012). The reality of our global future : how five unstoppable high-tech trends will dominate our lives and transform our world. [North Charleston, S.C.]: [Createspace]. ISBN 978-1470115487.
- Scott-Morgan, Peter (2012). The reality of global crises : why good beginnings are ending badly and leaving world-leaders increasingly powerless. [North Charleston, S.C.]: [Createspace]. ISBN 9781470115425.
- Scott-Morgan, Peter (1994). The unwritten rules of the game : master them, shatter them, and break through the barriers to organizational change. New York: McGraw-Hill. ISBN 978-0070570757.
- Scott, Peter B. (1984). The robotics revolution : the complete guide for managers and engineers. Oxford, OX, U.K.: B. Blackwell. ISBN 978-0631131625.
