= Public Finance Balance of Smoking in the Czech Republic =

2001 report

External media

Images
- Advert

Audio
- Richard Daynard, Tobacco Products Liability Project (RealMedia format), BBC

Video
- The BBC's Chiaka Nwosu (RealMedia format)
- "Death Saves You Money", NPR
- "Smoking good for the economy: Study", CTV

The Public Finance Balance of Smoking in the Czech Republic was a 2001 report commissioned by Philip Morris's Czech division following concerns raised by the Czech health ministry that smoking's costs outweighed its fiscal benefits.

== Report ==
The study was conducted by Arthur D. Little and found that smokers' early mortality and cigarette-tax revenue outweighed the costs of health-care and lost tax revenue from early death. The study concluded through cost-benefit analysis "based on up-to-date reliable data and consideration of all relevant contributing factors, the effect of smoking on the public finance balance in the Czech Republic in 1999 was positive, estimated at +5,815 mil. CZK."

On July 16, 2001, a leaked report associated with Philip Morris sparked widespread condemnation and intense criticism from various quarters, including politicians, anti-smoking activists, economists, and watchdog groups. In response to the backlash, Philip Morris disowned the report and issued an apology for its conclusions. Following this incident, economist Hana Ross conducted a study which revealed that smoking had a significant negative financial impact on the Czech government's budget, costing at least 14,455 million CZK (approximately $373 million) each year. This study effectively countered the report's argument that there were financial benefits from smoking-related deaths.

The report was unusual as historically, tobacco companies had denied the link between smoking and early mortality, whereas the report used early mortality as a selling point. Though similar studies in Europe had been done a decade earlier, Philip Morris stated that it had canceled any new similar reports in countries including Poland, Slovakia, Hungary, and Slovenia. CNN reported that an Arthur D. Little representative had told them that Philip Morris had commissioned similar studies in Canada and the Netherlands, though Philip Morris stated it had no such on-going reports.

The Czech Prime Minister, Miloš Zeman, had previously remarked on the financial advantages of smoking for the state budget. He humorously suggested that his smoking habit was a contribution to the state's fiscal stability, noting, "By smoking, I contribute to the stability of the state budget. By buying cigarettes, I increase state revenues, and when I die of lung cancer, the state won’t have to pay me a pension." Additionally, Zeman pointed out that smokers support the state budget through tobacco taxes and indirectly reduce state expenditures by having shorter lifespans, thereby diminishing the need for state-provided elderly care.

The stated objective of the report "was to determine whether costs imposed on public finance by smokers are offset by tobacco-related tax contributions and external positive effects of smoking."

== Public relations timeline ==
Following the leak, the company initially defended the report. Philip Morris spokesman Remi Calvert stating that "It is very unfortunate that this is one aspect of the study that is being focused on" adding that "We understand that it appears quite cold, but tobacco is a controversial product." Robert Kaplan, director of communications at Philip Morris International stated that the report's purported death benefit was "just one point" and "was not the point we were emphasizing."

The company subsequently apologized for the report. Kaplan later stated that "We are not in any way suggesting that the social cost of smoking is of benefit to society." Steven Parrish, vice-president at Philip Morris, stating that "We understand that this was not only a terrible mistake, but that it was wrong. To say it's inappropriate is an understatement." In an internal memo, CEO John R. Nelson agreed with critics that the report "exhibited a callous and cynical disregard of basic human values." On July 26, 2001, Phillip Morris issued an apology in The Wall Street Journal:

For one of our tobacco companies to commission this study (AD Little Report concluding that smokers save the state money - by dying early) was not just a terrible mistake, it was wrong. All of us at Philip Morris, no matter where we work, are extremely sorry for this. No one benefits from the very real, serious and significant diseases caused by smoking. We understand the outrage that has been expressed and we sincerely regret this extraordinarily unfortunate incident. We will continue our best efforts to do the right thing in all our business, acknowledging mistakes when we make them and learning from them as we go forward.

The release of the report was viewed as a setback for Philip Morris which had been making charitable donations to improve its public image.

== Reaction ==
"Further complicating life for the weekly opinion distributor is the overabundance of events and statements which invite comment, usually critical. So much folly, so little space."
—Waldo Proffitt, Sarasota Herald-Tribune

Mladá Fronta Dnes described the report as "first-class cynicism and hyena-ism" comparing it to how Nazis determined the value of life in Nazi concentration camps adding "What an offer: `come help us make money on the death of your citizens." The Sarasota Herald-Tribune described the report as "The Philip Morris Health Plan" comparing it to Jonathan Swift's A Modest Proposal.

Following the report, anti-smoking groups placed ads in prominent newspapers such as the New York Times depicting a corpse with a price tag stating "$1,227, [£860] that's how much a study sponsored by Philip Morris said the Czech Republic saves on healthcare, pensions and housing every time a smoker dies".

Academia

- The report is commonly covered as a case study in morality.

Politicians

- On 17 July 2001, U.S. Senator Dianne Feinstein called the report "appalling" and wrote to CEO Geoffry Bible that "by including a cost-benefit analysis of human lives in its calculations, Phillip Morris has stepped well-past the lines of decency and demonstrated, once again, that it conducts business in a manner completely disconnected from any sense of right and wrong.
- Libor Rouček, stated that "It is unbelievable that Philip Morris dares to conduct this study in this country" adding that "It is ethically unacceptable to think and write about human life in those categories."

Watchdogs

- INFACT stated "Even if it were true that smokers dying young would save money for the economy, it's a real scary logic on which to base policy."
- Campaign for Tobacco-Free Kids questioned whether "a responsible, reformed tobacco company tell foreign governments that dead smokers are a good thing for their budgets?"
- Tobacco Products Liability Project stated that "The governments role normally is to protect the health and safety and welfare of their citizens so the idea that somehow or another the government or the state could be benefiting by their citizens dying off would strike anybody who has their conscious reasonably intact as being really quite dreadful."

== See also ==
- Cost-benefit
- Value of life
- The Smoke Screen
