= Synectics =

Thought process for making the strange familiar and the familiar strange

Synectics is a problem solving methodology that stimulates thought processes of which the subject may be unaware. This method was developed by George M. Prince (1918–2009) and William J.J. Gordon (1919–2003), originating in the Arthur D. Little Invention Design Unit in the 1950s.

According to Gordon, Synectics research has three main assumptions:

- the creative process can be described and taught
- invention processes in arts and sciences are analogous and are driven by the same "psychic" processes
- individual and group creativity are analogous

== History ==
The process grew out of recording meetings—first audio and later video—followed by analysis of the recordings and trials of alternative ways to address obstacles encountered during sessions. In this context, "success" was defined as arriving at a creative solution to which the group was committed to proceed with implementation.

The term Synectics derives from the Greek and denotes the joining together of different, seemingly unrelated elements.

Gordon and Prince applied the name Synectics both to their practice and to the company they founded, a dual use that can lead to confusion, since people outside the company have also been trained in and use the method. Although the name was trademarked, it has come to be used as a generic label for group-based creative problem solving.

== Theory ==
Synectics is a way to approach creativity and problem-solving in a rational way. "Traditionally, the creative process has been considered after the fact... The Synectics study has attempted to research creative process in vivo, while it is going on."

According to Gordon, Synectics research has three main assumptions:

- The creative process can be described and taught;
- Invention processes in arts and sciences are analogous and are driven by the same "psychic" processes;
- Individual and group creativity are analogous.

With these assumptions in mind, Synectics believes that people can be better at being creative if they understand how creativity works.

One important element in creativity is embracing the seemingly irrelevant. Emotion is emphasized over intellect and the irrational over the rational. Through understanding the emotional and irrational elements of a problem or idea, a group can be more successful at solving a problem.

Prince emphasized the importance of creative behaviour in reducing inhibitions and releasing the inherent creativity of everyone. He and his colleagues developed specific practices and meeting structures which help people to ensure that their constructive intentions are experienced positively by one another. The use of the creative behaviour tools extends the application of Synectics to many situations beyond invention sessions (particularly constructive resolution of conflict).

Gordon emphasized the importance of "'metaphorical process' to make the familiar strange and the strange familiar". He expressed his central principle as: "Trust things that are alien, and alienate things that are trusted." This encourages, on the one hand, fundamental problem-analysis and, on the other hand, the alienation of the original problem through the creation of analogies. It is thus possible for new and surprising solutions to emerge.

Within Spanish-language educational literature, educator Saturnino de la Torre developed classroom procedures centered on analogy and metaphor that intersect with synectic practice. His Diálogo Analógico Creativo (Analogical Creative Dialogue, DAC) approach organizes sequences of analogy generation, perspective shifting, and the stepwise development of ideas in groups, with the aim of turning initial intuitions into actionable proposals; a design that resonates with Synectics’ "springboarding" as well as the role of the trained facilitator.

As an invention tool, Synectics invented a technique called "springboarding" for getting creative beginning ideas. For the development of beginning ideas, the method incorporates brainstorming and deepens and widens it with metaphor; it also adds an important evaluation process for Idea Development, which takes embryonic new ideas that are attractive but not yet feasible and builds them into new courses of action which have the commitment of the people who will implement them.

Synectics is more demanding of the subject than brainstorming, as the steps involved imply that the process is more complicated and requires more time and effort. The success of the Synectics methodology depends highly on the skill of a trained facilitator.

== Books ==
- The Practice of Creativity: A Manual for Dynamic Group Problem-Solving. George M. Prince, 2012, Vermont: Echo Point Books & Media, LLC, 0-9638-7848-4
- The Practice of Creativity by George Prince 1970
- Synectics: The Development of Creative Capacity by W. J. J. Gordon, London, Collier-MacMillan, 1961
- Design Synectics: Stimulating Creativity in Design by Nicholas Roukes, Published by Davis Publications, 1988
- The Innovators Handbook by Vincent Nolan 1989
- Creativity Inc.: Building an Inventive Organization by Jeff Mauzy and Richard Harriman 2003
- Imagine That! by Vincent Nolan and Connie Williams, Publishers Graphics, LLC, 2010

== See also ==
- List of thought processes
