= David Levy (inventor) =

David Levy (born December 30, 1962) is an inventor with more than a dozen patents. He also served as "Inventor in Residence" to Arthur D. Little Consulting. He received a bachelor's degree in mechanical engineering with a concentration in architecture and master's degree in mechanical engineering at the Massachusetts Institute of Technology in 1987 and a doctorate in mechanical engineering from MIT in 1997. Between degrees he worked for five years at Apple, replacing the Trackball with the first Touchpad and repositioning the laptop keyboard from the front to the back.

He is a native of Manhattan Beach, California and lived in Cambridge, Massachusetts, for many years, but as of 2010 has been a resident of Berkeley, California.

In 1989, he started his first company TH Inc., without venture capital to license his own patents.

In 1999, Levy started a company called Digit Wireless, with the help of angel investors and venture capital, ultimately raising $21 million. Digit Wireless was started with the purpose of developing Levy's Fastap keypad technology for cell phones/PDA devices. As of 2007, there were three Fastap-enabled cell phones introduced in North America—two in Canada and one in the United States. In 2003, he invented the concept of tracing a finger over the image of a QWERTY keyboard to indicate which word the user is trying to type, for which he received US patent 7,175,438. Digit Wireless was sold to Nuance Communications in March 2010.

In 2013 he joined Innovate America, LLC, a Boston-based biotechnology startup as a business consultant. Levy restructured the company and renamed it "OH2 Laboratories", then to focus exclusively on monetizing a collection of patents on solubilizing G-Protein Coupled Receptors, a technology invented by Shuguang Zhang PhD and licensed from MIT. The OH2 business plan is to use solubilized GPCRs as a new path to drug discovery, especially monoclonal antibodies.

== Inventions ==
- Peelables—layered self-adhering labels that peel off to uncover new ones, licensed to 3M and BASF for video cassettes and computer diskettes.
- Fastap keypad, formerly known as OneTouch. Recognized by the Guinness Book of World Records as the world's smallest keypad
- Wedgie bicycle seat lock, to prevent bicycle seats from being stolen. Licensed by Kryponite Corp, but not developed into a product.
- Trace Fast Typing Method (US Patent 7175438) - Acquired by Nuance Communications.
- Improved Vascular Splicing Method" using biocompatible O-rings to minimize blood contamination and reduce the time to seal blood vessels during surgery;
- Pass-It TV remote control, designed to be thrown around like a football (co-invented with 1997 Lemelson-MIT Student Prize winner Nathan Kane).
