= George M. Prince =

George Mather Prince (April 5, 1918 – June 9, 2009) was an American author and the co-creator of synectics with William J. J. Gordon.

Prince was born in Richmond, New York to Howard Prince, a surgeon, and Marguerite Prince. He grew up in Rochester, New York and attended Phillips Exeter Academy and Williams College. He joined the Arthur D. Little Consulting Company when he heard about the creativity experiments going on there.

George Prince died in Weston, Massachusetts at the age of 91.

== Works ==
Books

- The Practice of Creativity: A Manual for Dynamic Group Problem-Solving. George M. Prince, 2012, Vermont: Echo Point Books & Media, ISBN 978-0963878489
- The Practice of Creativity. George M. Prince, 1970, New York: Collier Books, Div. of Macmillan Publishing, Co. Inc.
- Mindspring! George M. Prince, Private printing, Copyright 1980
- Your Life is a Series of Meetings - Get a Good Life George M. Prince with Kathleen Logan-Prince, 2002 1st Books Library, www.1stbooks.com
- Culture and Creativity, George M. Prince, working manuscript, 2003
- Managing the Field, George M. Prince, workshop manual, 1988
- Mind-Free Program - Player/Coach Manual George M. Prince, 1988
- An Experiment to Examine and Reduce Self-Punishment George M. Prince, unpublished manuscript, 1988

Articles

- "How to Be a Better Meeting Chairman," Harvard Business Review, Jan. 1969.
- "Synectics: Twenty-five Years of Research into Creativity and Group Process," American Society for Training and Development,1982.
- "Synectics Group Planning and Problem-Solving Methods in Engineering," John Wiley & Sons,1982.
- "Recognizing Genuine Teamwork," Supervisory Management, April 1989.
- "Creative Meetings Through Power Sharing," Harvard Business Review, July 1, 1972.
- "Mindspring: Suggesting Answers to Why Productivity is Low," Chem Tech, May 1976.
- "Creativity and Learning As Skills, Not Talents," The Philips-Exeter Bulletin, June - July 1980.
- "Creativity, Self and Power," Perspectives in Creativity, edited by Irving A. Taylor & J.W. Getzels, Aldine Publishing Company, Chicago, 1975.
- "Training Both Sides of the Brain to Work Together," Training/HRD magazine *"Liberating Creativity and Learning," Chapter in Creative Education: Educating a Nation of Innovators, V.C. Nolan, editor, Synectics Education Initiative, Stoke Mandeville
