= Textron =

American industrial conglomerate

Textron Inc.

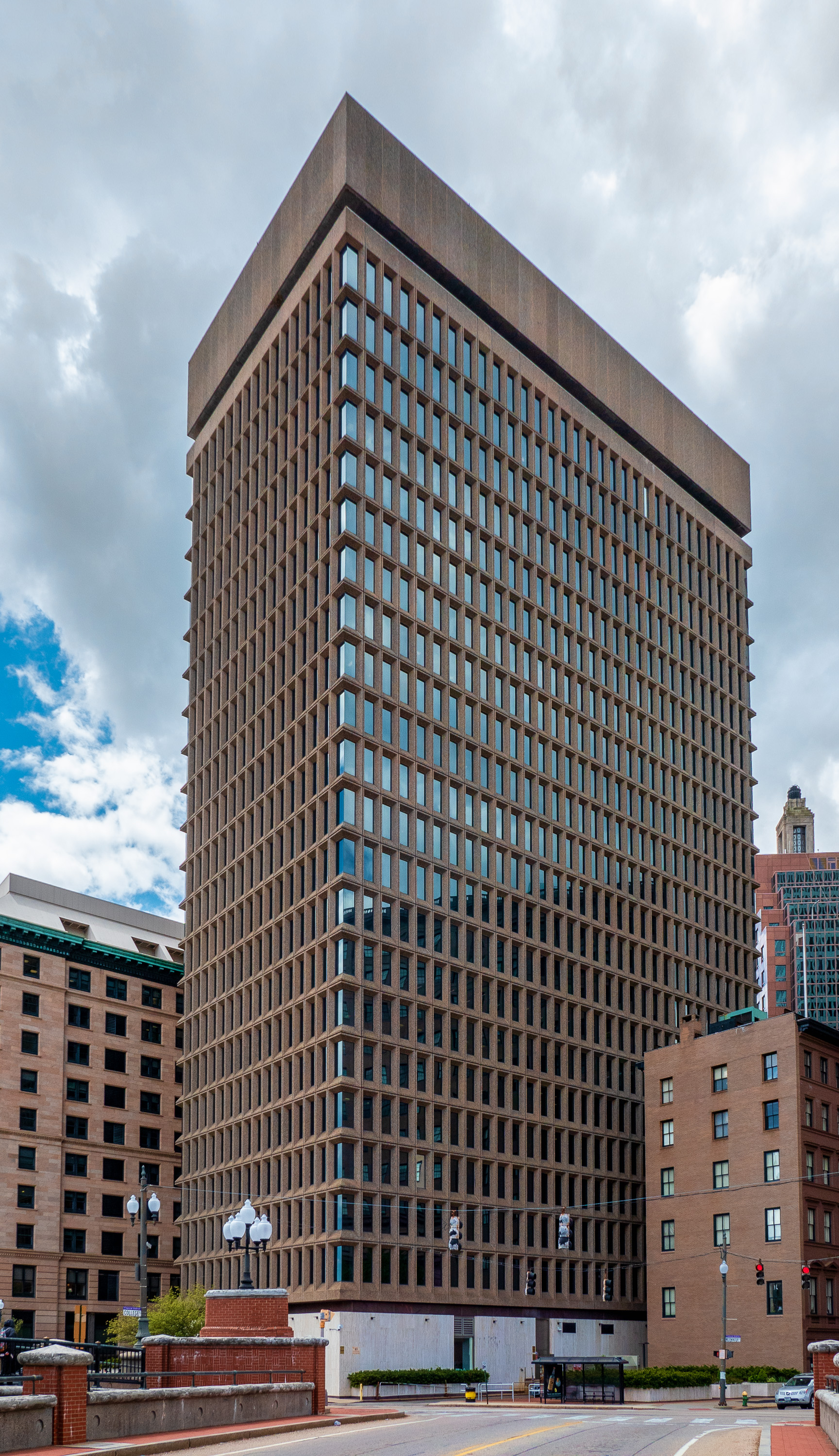
- Textron Tower, the company's headquarters
- Formerly: Special Yarns Company
- Type: Public
- Traded as: NYSE: TXT; S&P 500 component
- ISIN: US8832031012
- Industry: Aerospace; Automotive; Defense
- Founded: 1923; 103 years ago
- Founder: Royal Little
- Headquarters: Textron Tower, Providence, Rhode Island, US
- Key people: Lisa Atherton (CEO & president)
- Revenue: ▲US$13.7 billion (2024)
- Operating income: ▼US$777 million (2024)
- Net income: ▼US$824 million (2024)
- Total assets: ▼US$16.8 billion (2024)
- Total equity: ▲US$7.20 billion (2024)
- Number of employees: c. 34,000 (2024)
- Subsidiaries: Subsidiary list: AAI Corporation; Able Aerospace Services; Advanced Information Solutions; Arctic Cat; Avco; Beechcraft; Bell Textron; Cessna Aircraft; E-Z-GO; Geospatial Solutions; Jacobsen Manufacturing; Kautex; Lycoming Engines; Pipistrel; Textron AirLand; Textron Marine & Land Systems; Textron Weapon & Sensor Systems; TRU Simulation & Training
- Website: textron.com

Textron Inc. is an American industrial conglomerate based in Providence, Rhode Island. Textron's subsidiaries include Bell Textron, Kautex, Textron Aviation (which itself includes the Beechcraft and Cessna brands), and Lycoming Engines. It was founded by Royal Little in 1923 as the Special Yarns Company.

In 2026, Textron employed over 45,000 people in 25 countries. The company ranked 265th on the 2021 Fortune 500 of the largest United States corporations by revenue.

== History ==
=== Early history ===
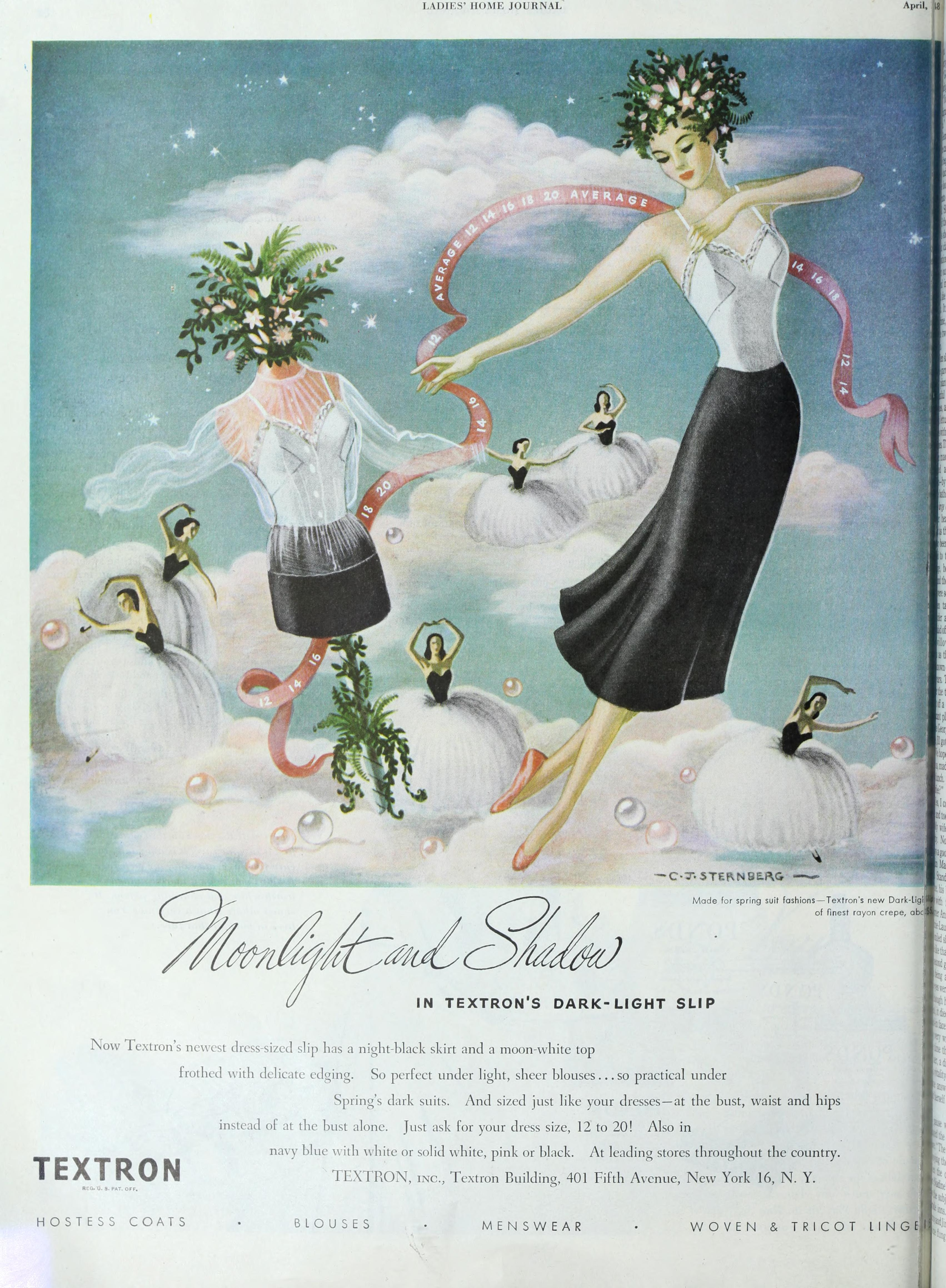
Textron fabrics ad from 1948

Textron started as a textile company in 1928, when 37-year-old Royal Little founded the Special Yarns Corporation in Boston, Massachusetts. The company manufactured synthetic yarns, a niche product at the time. By the start of World War II, the company was known as Atlantic Rayon Corporation and manufactured parachutes. As war production wound down, the company started making civilian products as well and was renamed Textron: "Tex" for "textiles" and "tron" from synthetics such as "Lustron". The company was listed on the NYSE in 1947.

Royal Little began the process of turning Textron into a conglomerate in 1953, with the purchase of Burkart Manufacturing Company (upholstery filling for the automotive industry) in September 1953, followed by the purchase of Dalmo-Victor (airborne Radar Antennae) and MB Manufacturing Company in early 1954. The push for diversification would see Textron purchase various other manufacturing companies. In 1960, the company also bought Bell Aerospace and E-Z-Go. The textile division was sold to Deering Milliken in 1963.

Later CEOs included G. William Miller (1968–1977), Joseph Collinson (1977–1979) and Robert P. Straetz (1979–1986). In 1984, Textron took on more debt and bought Avco, a conglomerate almost as big as itself. Later on, James Hardymon took over as CEO. This $1.4 billion acquisition included the parent of Paul Revere Insurance Company (through 1996, when they sold it).

=== Campbell era ===
James Hardymon brought in Lewis B. Campbell, who became CEO in 1998. Starting in 2000, Campbell led a company-wide restructuring program. The share price fell to as low as $13/share in March 2003 after the economic downturn following the collapse of Internet companies and the terrorist attacks on the World Trade Center. Diminished demand for helicopters and airplanes led to layoffs at Cessna and Bell Textron.

In 2007, the Wall Street Journal reported that Campbell had received $494,700 in compensation in the form of his use of a corporate jet to travel between his home and office, which made him the most expensive CEO in the country in terms of use of jet travel. Some shareholders have questioned whether it is a good use of shareholder dollars to pay for the personal lifestyle choice of the CEO to live in one state and work in another. Shares in Textron plummeted to as low as $10.09 per share in the aftermath of the 2008 economic downturn, driving its market capitalization down to just $3.17 billion.

=== After Campbell ===
Scott C. Donnelly became CEO in December 2009. Textron acquired Mechtronix in Montreal, Quebec, and OPINICUS in Tampa, Florida, in 2013. Donnelly combined these flight simulation companies, along with Textron's AAI Logistics & Technical Services, to form TRU Simulation & Training in 2014.

On December 26, 2013, Textron agreed to purchase Beechcraft, including the discontinued Hawker jet line, for $1.4 billion. The sale closed in March 2014. The company formed a new company called Textron Aviation to market the products of Beechcraft, Cessna and Hawker as individual brands.

From 2013 to 2016, R&D investments were 4.3%, 4.0%, 4.6%, and 4.2% of its revenues ($13.78 billion in 2016) and totaled more than $2.2 billion as it developed seven aircraft: the Bell 525 Relentless, Bell V-280 Valor tiltrotor, Cessna Citation Longitude, Cessna Citation Hemisphere, Beechcraft Denali single-engine turboprop, the Cessna SkyCourier twin cargo hauler and the Textron Scorpion close support jet after the certification of the Bell 505 Jet Ranger X.

In March 2022, Textron agreed to acquire Pipistrel, an electrically powered aircraft manufacturer based in Italy and Slovenia.

On April 5, 2022, U.S. authorities announced criminal as well as civil charges in a Manhattan federal court against the former head of a now-defunct London-based company, Xcalibur Aerospace Ltd., for making a fraudulent bid to buy Textron for $13.8 billion. The Department of Justice and the SEC claimed that Xcalibur Aerospace was never in a position to complete a tender offer for Textron and lacked the finances to do so.

In October 2025, it was announced that Lisa Atherton will be President and CEO, effective January 4, 2026

Textron, the American group that controls aircraft manufacturers such as Cessna, Beechcraft, and Bell, announced on 2026 November 18, the sale of its industrial division for US$ 1.2 billion.

== Divisions ==
=== Able Aerospace Services ===
Able Aerospace Services is an international business and $70 million aerospace enterprise that is performing more than 2,800 proprietary FAA-approved repairs on aircraft and components.

=== ATAC ===
Airborne Tactical Advantage Company (ATAC) is a government contractor based in Newport News, Virginia.

=== Arctic Cat ===
On March 6, 2017, Textron acquired Arctic Cat for US$247 million. Arctic Cat is a manufacturer of snowmobiles, all-terrain vehicles, and side-by-sides. Textron sold the Arctic Cat division in April of 2025 to former executive Brad Darling. This came a few months after Textron announced it was halting manufacturing at its Thief River Falls and Saint Cloud, MN locations. Textron operated Arctic Cat as a subsidiary of Textron Specialized Vehicles.

=== Bell Textron ===
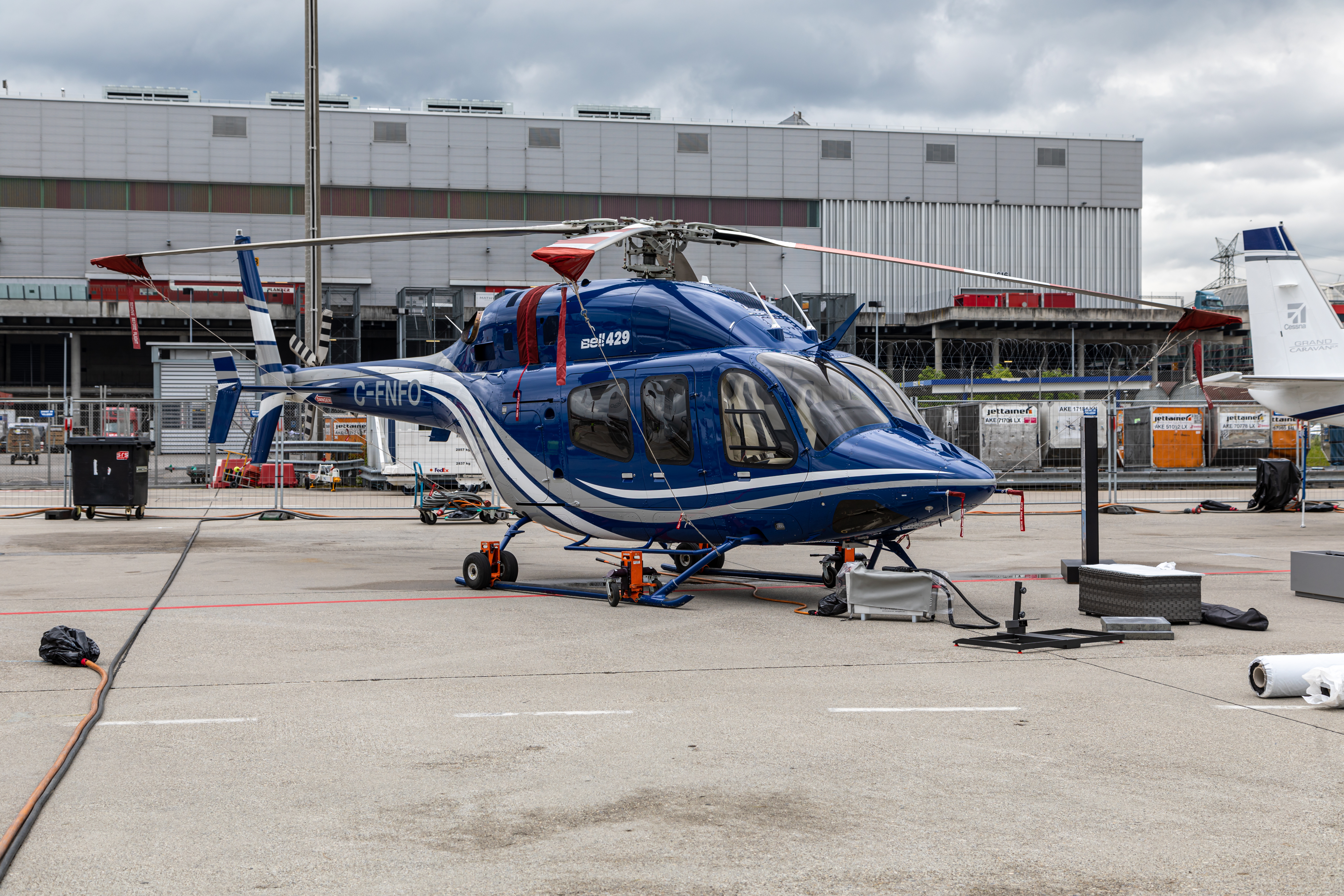
Bell 429 Helicopter

Bell Textron is an American helicopter and rotorcraft manufacturer headquartered in Fort Worth, Texas.

=== E-Z-GO ===
Acquired by Textron in 1960, E-Z-GO is a designer and manufacturer of light transportation vehicles for golf courses, planned communities, campuses, and other uses. Products include electric and internal combustion golf carts, low speed vehicles and other multipurpose utility vehicles under the E-Z-Go, Cushman and Bad Boy Buggy brands.

=== Greenlee ===
Greenlee Textron is an industrial and electrical tool company headquartered in Rockford, Illinois. It was founded in 1862 by brothers Robert and Ralph Greenlee to manufacture their invention, a drill surrounded by four chisel blades, used in making the pockets for a mortise and tenon joint for the furniture industry in Rockford. This device is still used in cabinetmaking. The brothers later diversified into a variety of hand woodworking tools as well as machinery for making wooden barrels. The company was acquired by Textron in 1986. Greenlee produces various wire and cable installation tools that are used in a variety of fields. On April 18, 2018, Textron announced that it would sell its Greenlee brand to Emerson Electric.

=== Jacobsen ===
Textron purchased Jacobsen Manufacturing in June 1978 and continued to produce Jacobsen garden tractors into the 1990s. Today, Jacobsen sells various products used for turf care: maintenance equipment, vehicles, and other products.

=== Kautex Textron ===
Kautex Textron is a supplier to the automotive industry. The company produces plastic fuel systems, selective catalytic reduction systems, windshield and headlamp washer systems, and other products. In August 2019, Textron Inc. was looking to spin off or sell this division to focus on higher-margin parts of their business.

=== Textron AirLand ===
Textron AirLand, LLC is a joint venture between Textron Inc. and AirLand Enterprises, LLC that is currently developing the Textron AirLand Scorpion aircraft as a private venture.

=== Textron Aviation ===
Textron Aviation is a new venture formed in March 2014 from Beechcraft and Cessna, retaining the Beechcraft, Cessna and Hawker aircraft type names as brands.

- Beechcraft Corporation is an American manufacturer of general aviation and military aircraft, ranging from light, single-engined aircraft to twin-engined turboprop transports and military trainers.
- The Cessna Aircraft Company is an American general aviation aircraft manufacturing corporation headquartered in Wichita, Kansas. It was merged into Textron Aviation in March 2014.

=== Textron eAviation ===
In March 2022 Textron agreed to buy Slovenian aircraft builder Pipistrel and form a new division for electric aircraft development, called Textron eAviation. Pipistrel will continue as a brand and retain its existing headquarters and operations in Slovenia and Italy. Textron will invest in the division to hasten future aircraft development and production. Pipistrel's founder and CEO, Ivo Boscarol, will stay on as a minority shareholder and also as the Chairman Emeritus. The purchase was completed in April 2022, for a price of US$235M.

=== Textron Fastening Systems ===
Textron combined its 1995 acquisition of Avdel with its 1959 acquisition Cherry Aerospace to form Textron Aerospace Fasteners. Rebranded to Textron Fastening Systems in 2003, the division was sold to Platinum Equity in 2006 and renamed Acument Global Technologies.

=== Textron Systems ===
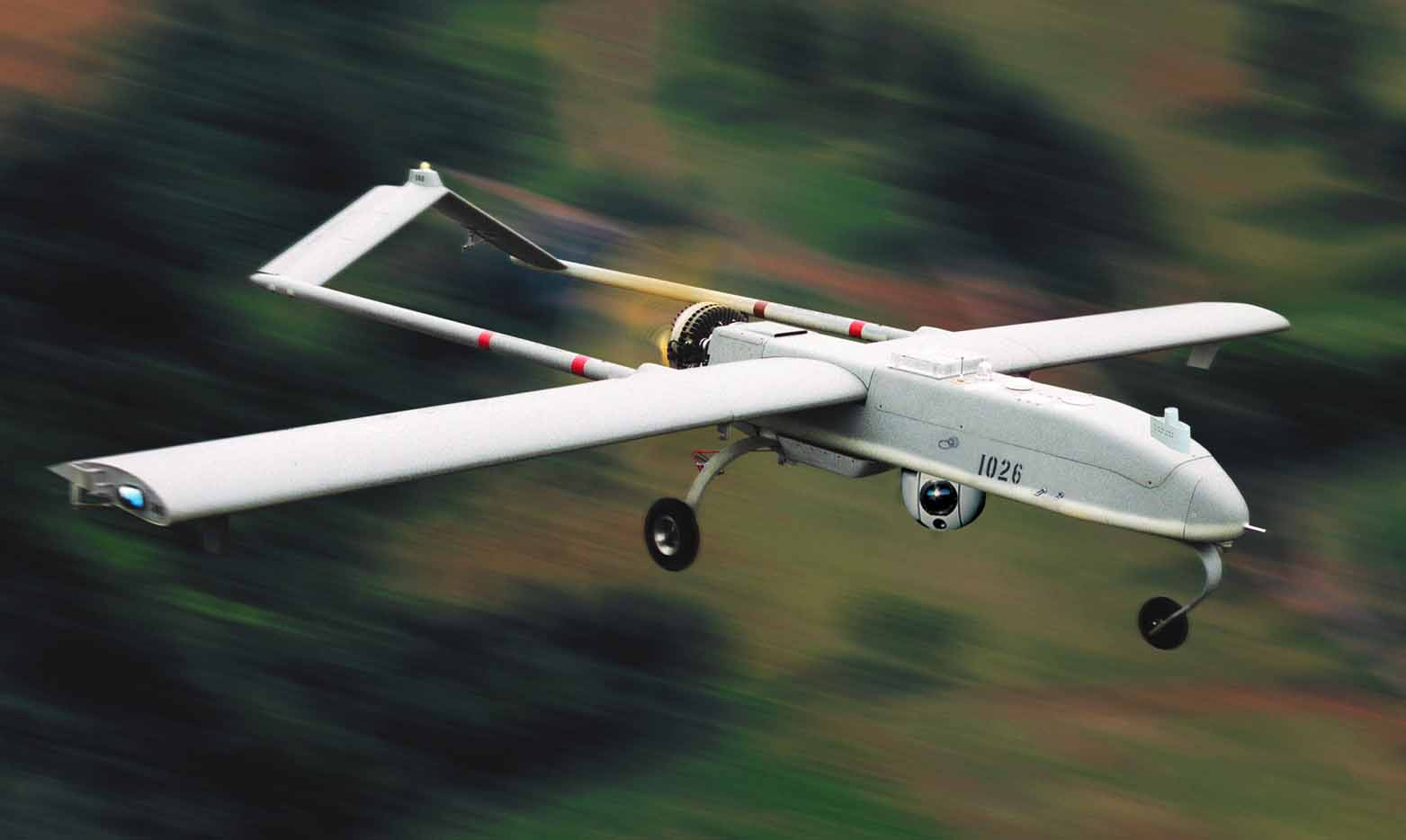
RQ-7B Shadow UAV

Textron Systems is an aerospace and defense development and manufacturing firm headquartered in Providence, Rhode Island. The company reported 2012 annual sales in the Textron Systems segment as $1.7 billion.

Its operating units are:

- Support Solutions, Electronic Solutions, Unmanned Systems (Hunt Valley, Maryland)
- Advanced Information Solutions (Austin, Texas)
- Geospatial Solutions (Sterling, Virginia)
- Lycoming Engines (Williamsport, Pennsylvania)
- Marine & Land Systems (Slidell, Louisiana)
- TRU Simulation & Training (Tampa, Florida)
- Weapon & Sensor Systems (Wilmington, Massachusetts): a maker of weapons such as anti-vehicle mines and surveillance systems.
