= List of places in New York: C =

This list of current cities, towns, unincorporated communities, counties, and other recognized places in the U.S. state of New York also includes information on the number and names of counties in which the place lies, and its lower and upper zip code bounds, if applicable.

List of places in New York: A | B | C | D | E | F | G | H | I | J | K | L | M | N | O | P | Q | R | S | T | U | V | W | X | Y | Z

Name of place	Counties	Principal county	Lower zip code	Upper zip code
Cabinhill	1	Delaware County	13752	
Cadiz	1	Cattaraugus County	14737	
Cadosia	1	Delaware County	13783	
Cadyville	1	Clinton County	12918	
Cagwin Corners	1	Oneida County		
Cahoonzie	1	Orange County	12780	
Cains Corners	1	Oswego County		
Cairo	1	Greene County	12413	
Cairo Junction	1	Greene County		
Calciana	1	Wayne County		
Calcium	1	Jefferson County	13616	
Calcutta	1	Otsego County	12064	
Caldwell	1	Warren County		
Caledonia	1	Livingston County	14423	
Calico Colony	1	Saratoga County	12065	
Callanans Corners	1	Albany County	12143	
Callicoon	1	Sullivan County	12723	
Callicoon Center	1	Sullivan County	12724	
Calverton	1	Suffolk County	11933	
Calverton-Roanoke	1	Suffolk County		
Cambria	1	Niagara County		
Cambria Center	1	Niagara County		
Cambria Heights	1	Queens County	11411	
Cambridge	1	Washington County	12816	
Camby	1	Dutchess County		
Camden	1	Oneida County	13316	
Cameron	1	Steuben County	14819	
Cameron Mills	1	Steuben County	14820	
Camillus	1	Onondaga County	13031	
Campbell	2	Madison County		
Campbell	2	Steuben County	14821	
Campbell Hall	1	Orange County	10916	
Campbell Hall Junction	1	Orange County		
Camp Drum	1	Jefferson County	13602	
Camp Hemlock	1	Sullivan County	12721	
Camp Hill	1	Rockland County	10970	
Camp Lakeland	1	Erie County		
Camp Pioneer	1	Erie County		
Camps Mills	1	Jefferson County	13601	
Campville	1	Tioga County	13760	
Camroden	1	Oneida County	13440	
Canaan	1	Columbia County	12029	
Canaan Center	1	Columbia County	12029	
Canada Lake	1	Fulton County	12032	
Canadice	1	Ontario County	14560	
Canajoharie	1	Montgomery County	13317	
Canal Street	1	New York County	10013	
Canandaigua	1	Ontario County	14424	
Canarsie	1	Kings County	11236	
Canaseraga	1	Allegany County	14822	
Canastota	1	Madison County	13032	
Canawaugus	1	Livingston County	14423	
Candor	1	Tioga County	13743	
Caneadea	1	Allegany County	14717	
Canisteo	1	Steuben County	14823	
Canisteo Center	1	Steuben County		
Cannon Corners	1	Clinton County	12959	
Canoe Place	1	Suffolk County	11946	
Canoga	1	Seneca County	13148	
Canoga Springs	1	Seneca County		
Canterbury Hill	1	Oneida County	13440	
Canton	1	St. Lawrence County	13617	
Cape Vincent	1	Jefferson County	13618	
Capitol	1	Albany County	12224	
Capitol Annex	1	Albany County	12225	
Capitol Hills	1	Orange County	10950	
Captain Kidd Estates	1	Suffolk County	11952	
Cardiff	1	Onondaga County	13084	
Cards Corners	1	Onondaga County		
Cardtown	1	Otsego County		
Careys Corners	1	Oneida County		
Carle Place	1	Nassau County	11514	
Carle Terrace	1	Ulster County	12449	
Carley Mills	1	Oswego County		
Carlisle	1	Schoharie County	12031	
Carlisle Center	1	Schoharie County	12035	
Carlisle Gardens	1	Niagara County	14094	
Carlton	1	Orleans County	14411	
Carman	1	Schenectady County	12303	
Carmel	1	Putnam County	10512	
Carmel Hamlet	1	Putnam County	10512	
Carmel Hills	1	Putnam County	10512	
Carmel Park Estates	1	Putnam County	10512	
Carmen	1	Albany County	12303	
Carmichael Hill	1	Oneida County		
Carnegie	1	Erie County	14075	
Caroga	1	Fulton County		
Caroga Lake	1	Fulton County	12032	
Caroline	1	Tompkins County	14817	
Caroline Center	1	Tompkins County	14817	
Caroline Depot	1	Tompkins County		
Carpenters Corners	1	Fulton County		
Carroll	2	Cattaraugus County		
Carroll	2	Chautauqua County		
Carrollton	1	Cattaraugus County	14748	
Carson	1	Steuben County	14823	
Carterville	1	Oswego County		
Carthage	1	Jefferson County	13619	
Carver	1	New York County		
Cascade	1	Cayuga County	13118	
Cascade Valley	1	Broome County		
Case	1	Onondaga County	13084	
Casowasco	1	Cayuga County	13118	
Cass	1	Erie County	14206	
Cassadaga	1	Chautauqua County	14718	
Cassville	1	Oneida County	13318	
Castile	1	Wyoming County	14427	
Castile Center	1	Wyoming County	14427	
Castle	1	Westchester County	10801	
Castle Clinton National Monument	1	New York County	10005	
Castle Creek	1	Broome County	13744	
Castle Hill	1	Bronx County	10462	
Castle Point	1	Dutchess County	12511	
Castleton Corners	1	Richmond County	10314	
Castleton on Hudson	1	Rensselaer County	12033	
Castorland	1	Lewis County	13620	
Catatonk	1	Tioga County	13827	
Catawba	1	Steuben County		
Catfish Corners	1	Oswego County		
Catharine	1	Schuyler County	14869	
Cathedral	1	New York County	10025	
Catherine	1	Schuyler County		
Catherineville	1	St. Lawrence County		
Catlin	1	Chemung County		
Catlin Hill	1	Tioga County		
Town of Cato	1	Cayuga County	13033	
Caton	1	Steuben County	14830	
Cator Corners	1	Wayne County		
Catskill (town)	1	Greene County	12414	
Cattaraugus	1	Cattaraugus County	14719	
Cattaraugus Indian Reservation	3	Cattaraugus County	14204	
Cattaraugus Indian Reservation	3	Chautauqua County	14204	
Cattaraugus Indian Reservation	3	Erie County	14204	
Cattown	1	Otsego County	13337	
Caughdenoy	1	Oswego County	13036	
Cauterskill	1	Greene County		
Cayuga	1	Cayuga County	13034	
Cayuga Heights	1	Tompkins County	14850	
Cayuga Junction	1	Cayuga County		
Cayuga Nation	2	Cattaraugus County		
Cayuga Nation	2	Cayuga County		
Cayuta	1	Schuyler County	14824	
Cayutaville	1	Schuyler County	14805	
Caywood	1	Seneca County	14860	
Cazenovia	1	Madison County	13035	
Cecil Park	1	Westchester County		
Cedar Bluffs	1	Saratoga County		
Cedar Cliff	1	Orange County		
Cedarcrest	1	Livingston County	14487	
Cedar Flats	1	Rockland County	10980	
Cedar Hill	1	Albany County	12158	
Cedarhurst	1	Nassau County	11516	
Cedar Knolls	1	Westchester County		
Cedar Lake	1	Herkimer County		
Cedar Manor	1	Queens County		
Cedars	1	St. Lawrence County		
Cedar Swamp	1	Monroe County		
Cedarvale	1	Onondaga County	13215	
Cedarville	1	Herkimer County	13357	
Cedarville Station	1	Herkimer County		
Celoron	1	Chautauqua County	14720	
Cementon	1	Greene County	12415	
Centenary	1	Rockland County	10956	
Center Avenue	1	Nassau County		
Center Berlin	1	Rensselaer County	12022	
Center Brunswick	1	Rensselaer County	12180	
Centerbury Hill	1	Oneida County	13440	
Center Cambridge	1	Washington County	12816	
Centereach	1	Suffolk County	11720	
Center Falls	1	Washington County	12834	
Centerfield	1	Ontario County	14424	
Center Lisle	1	Broome County	13797	
Center Moriches	1	Suffolk County	11934	
Centerport	2	Cayuga County	13166	
Centerport	2	Suffolk County	11721	
Center Valley	1	Otsego County		
Center Village	1	Broome County		
Centerville	5	Allegany County	14029	
Centerville	5	Delaware County	13756	
Centerville	5	Oswego County		
Centerville	5	Suffolk County		
Centerville	5	Ulster County		
Center White Creek	1	Washington County	12057	
Central	1	Queens County	11435	
Central Bridge	1	Schoharie County	12035	
Centralia	1	Chautauqua County	14782	
Central Islip	1	Suffolk County	11722	
Central Nyack	1	Rockland County	10960	
Central Park	1	Erie County	14215	
Central Square	1	Oswego County	13036	
Central Valley	1	Orange County	10917	
Central White Plains	1	Westchester County	10606	
Centre Island	1	Nassau County	11771	
Center Village	1	Broome County	13787	
Centuck	1	Westchester County	10710	
Ceres	1	Allegany County	14721	
Chace	1	Wyoming County		
Chadwicks	1	Oneida County	13319	
Chaffee	1	Erie County	14030	
Chamberlain Corners	1	St. Lawrence County	13660	
Chambers	1	Chemung County	14812	
Champion	1	Jefferson County	13619	
Champion Huddle	1	Jefferson County	13619	
Champlain	1	Clinton County	12919	
Champlain Park	1	Clinton County	12901	
Chapel Hill Estates	1	Westchester County	10598	
Chapin	1	Ontario County	14424	
Chapinville	1	Otsego County		
Chappaqua	1	Westchester County	10514	
Charleston	2	Montgomery County		
Charleston	2	Richmond County	10301	
Charleston Four Corners	1	Montgomery County	12166	
Charlesworth Corners	1	Montgomery County		
Charlotte	2	Chautauqua County		
Charlotte	2	Monroe County	14612	
Charlotte Center	1	Chautauqua County	14782	
Charlotteville	1	Schoharie County	12036	
Charlton	1	Saratoga County	12019	
Chase	1	Otsego County		
Chase Lake	1	Lewis County	13343	
Chase Mills	1	St. Lawrence County	13621	
Chaseville	1	Otsego County	12116	
Chasm Falls	1	Franklin County	12953	
Chateaugay	2	Franklin County	12920	
Chateaugay	2	Oswego County		
Chatfield Corner	1	Saratoga County		
Chatham	1	Columbia County	12037	
Chatham Center	1	Columbia County	12184	
Chaumont	1	Jefferson County	13622	
Chauncey	1	Westchester County	10502	
Chautauqua	1	Chautauqua County	14722	
Chautauqua Institution	1	Chautauqua County		
Chazy	1	Clinton County	12921	
Chazy Lake	1	Clinton County	12935	
Chazy Landing	1	Clinton County	12921	
Chedwel	1	Chautauqua County		
Cheektowaga	1	Erie County	14225	
Cheektowaga Northwest	1	Erie County	14225	
Cheektowaga Southwest	1	Erie County	14227	
Chelsea	2	Dutchess County	12512	
Chelsea	2	Richmond County	10314	
Chemung	1	Chemung County	14825	
Chemung Center	1	Chemung County	14825	
Chemung County Airport	1	Chemung County	14845	
Chemung Junction	1	Chemung County		
Chenango	1	Broome County		
Chenango Bridge	1	Broome County	13745	
Chenango Forks	1	Broome County	13746	
Chenango Lake	1	Chenango County	13815	
Cheneys Point	1	Chautauqua County	14710	
Cheningo	1	Cortland County	13158	
Chepachet	1	Herkimer County		
Cherokee	1	New York County	10028	
Cherry Creek	1	Chautauqua County	14723	
Cherry Grove	1	Suffolk County	11782	
Cherry Hill	1	Chautauqua County		
Cherryplain	1	Rensselaer County	12040	
Cherrytown	1	Ulster County	12446	
Cherry Valley	1	Otsego County	13320	
Cherry Valley Junction	1	Schoharie County	12043	
Cheshire	1	Ontario County	14424	
Chester	2	Orange County	10918	
Chester	2	Warren County		
Chesterfield	1	Essex County		
Chester Heights	1	Westchester County		
Chester Hill Park	1	Westchester County		
Chestertown	1	Warren County	12817	
Chestnut Hill	1	Onondaga County	13088	
Chestnut Ridge	3	Dutchess County		
Chestnut Ridge	3	Niagara County	14094	
Chestnut Ridge	3	Rockland County	10977	
Cheviot	1	Columbia County	12526	
Chichester	1	Ulster County	12416	
Childs	1	Orleans County	14411	
Childwold	1	St. Lawrence County	12922	
Chili	1	Monroe County	14624	
Chili Center	1	Monroe County	14624	
Chili Junction	1	Monroe County		
Chiloway	1	Delaware County		
Chilson	1	Essex County	12883	
Chimney Corners	1	Westchester County		
China	1	Delaware County	13754	
Chinatown	1	New York County	10013	
Chipman	1	St. Lawrence County		
Chipman Corners	1	Cayuga County		
Chipmunk	1	Cattaraugus County	14706	
Chippewa Bay	1	St. Lawrence County	13623	
Chittenango	1	Madison County	13037	
Chittenango Falls	1	Madison County	13035	
Chittenango Springs	1	Madison County		
Choconut Center	1	Broome County	13905	
Christian Hill	2	Tompkins County		
Christian Hill	2	Warren County		
Chuckery Corners	1	Oneida County	13323	
Church Corners	1	Montgomery County		
Church Street	1	New York County	10007	
Churchtown	1	Columbia County	12521	
Churchville	2	Monroe County	14428	
Churchville	2	Oneida County	13478	
Churchville Greene	1	Monroe County	14428	
Churubusco	1	Clinton County	12923	
Cibro	1	Onondaga County		
Cicero	1	Onondaga County	13039	
Cicero Center	1	Onondaga County	13041	
Cincinnatus	1	Cortland County	13040	
Circleville	1	Orange County	10919	
City Island	1	Bronx County	10464	
Clairemont Farms	1	Onondaga County	13088	
Clare	1	St. Lawrence County		
Claremont Park	1	Bronx County	10457	
Clarence	1	Erie County	14031	
Clarence Center	1	Erie County	14032	
Clarence Compact	1	Erie County		
Clarendon	1	Orleans County	14429	
Clark	1	Chautauqua County		
Clark Corners	2	Lewis County		
Clark Corners	2	Oswego County		
Clark Heights	1	Dutchess County	12569	
Clark Mills	1	Oneida County	13321	
Clark Point	1	Jefferson County		
Clarksburg	1	Erie County	14057	
Clarks Corner	1	Saratoga County		
Clarks Corners	1	Chautauqua County	14747	
Clarks Mills	1	Washington County	12834	
Clarkson	1	Monroe County	14430	
Clarkstown	1	Rockland County		
Clarksville	2	Albany County	12041	
Clarksville	2	Allegany County		
Clarkville	1	Saratoga County		
Claryville	1	Sullivan County	12725	
Clason Point	1	Bronx County	10473	
Classon	1	Kings County	11238	
Claverack	1	Columbia County	12513	
Claverack-Red Mills	1	Columbia County		
Clay	1	Onondaga County	13041	
Clayburg	1	Clinton County	12981	
Clayton	1	Jefferson County	13624	
Clayton Center	1	Jefferson County		
Clayville	1	Oneida County	13322	
Clear Creek	2	Cattaraugus County	14726	
Clear Creek	2	Chautauqua County	14726	
Clearfield	1	Erie County	14221	
Cleaver	1	Delaware County	13856	
Clemons	1	Washington County	12819	
Clermont	1	Columbia County	12526	
Cleveland	1	Oswego County	13042	
Cleveland Hill	1	Erie County	14225	
Cleverdale	1	Warren County	12820	
Cliff Haven	1	Clinton County	12901	
Clifford	1	Oswego County	13069	
Cliffside	1	Otsego County	12116	
Clifton	3	Monroe County	14428	
Clifton	3	Richmond County	10304	
Clifton	3	St. Lawrence County		
Clifton Gardens	1	Saratoga County	12065	
Clifton Heights	1	Erie County	14085	
Clifton Knolls	1	Saratoga County	12065	
Clifton Park	1	Saratoga County	12065	
Clifton Springs	1	Ontario County	14432	
Climax	1	Greene County	12042	
Clinton	3	Clinton County		
Clinton	3	Dutchess County		
Clinton	3	Oneida County	13323	
Clinton Corners	1	Dutchess County	12514	
Clinton County Airport	1	Clinton County		
Clintondale	1	Ulster County	12515	
Clinton Heights	1	Rensselaer County	12144	
Clinton Hollow	1	Dutchess County	12578	
Clinton Mills	1	Clinton County		
Clinton Park	2	Clinton County	12901	
Clinton Park	2	Rensselaer County	12144	
Clintonville	3	Clinton County	12924	
Clintonville	3	Onondaga County		
Clintonville	3	Otsego County		
Clockville	1	Madison County	13043	
Clough Corners	1	Broome County	13862	
Clove	2	Dutchess County		
Clove	2	Schoharie County	12043	
Clover Bank	1	Erie County	14075	
Clove Valley	1	Dutchess County		
Clums Corner	1	Rensselaer County		
Cluny Point	1	Livingston County		
Clyde	1	Wayne County	14433	
Clymer	1	Chautauqua County	14724	
Clymer Center	1	Chautauqua County		
Clymer Hill	1	Chautauqua County		
Cobb	1	Suffolk County	11976	
Cobbtown	1	Jefferson County		
Cobleskill	1	Schoharie County	12043	
Cochecton	1	Sullivan County	12726	
Cochecton Center	1	Sullivan County	12727	
Coeymans	1	Albany County	12045	
Coeymans Hollow	1	Albany County	12046	
Coffins Mills	1	St. Lawrence County	13670	
Cohocton	1	Steuben County	14826	
Cohoes	1	Albany County	12047	
Coila	1	Washington County	12816	
Cokertown	1	Dutchess County	12571	
Colburns	1	Chautauqua County		
Colchester	1	Delaware County	13856	
Coldbrook	2	Erie County	14072	
Cold Brook	2	Herkimer County	13324	
Coldbrook	2	Schenectady County	12303	
Cold Brook	2	Ulster County		
Cold Brook Estates	1	Albany County	12303	
Colden	1	Erie County	14033	
Coldenham	1	Orange County	12549	
Colden Hill	1	Orange County	12550	
Cold Spring	4	Cattaraugus County		
Cold Spring	4	Cayuga County	13021	
Cold Spring	4	Onondaga County		
Cold Spring	4	Putnam County	10516	
Cold Spring Harbor	1	Suffolk County	11724	
Cold Spring Park	1	Essex County		
Cold Springs	3	Onondaga County	13027	
Cold Springs	3	Seneca County		
Cold Springs	3	Steuben County	14810	
Cold Spring Terrace	1	Suffolk County	11743	
Coldwater	1	Monroe County	14624	
Colegrave	1	Erie County		
Colemans	1	Oneida County		
Colemans Mills	1	Oneida County	13492	
Coleman Station	1	Dutchess County		
Colesville	1	Broome County		
Colgate	1	Madison County	13346	
Collabar	1	Orange County	12549	
Collamer	2	Monroe County	14468	
Collamer	2	Onondaga County	13057	
College	1	New York County	10030	
College Park	1	Dutchess County	12571	
College Point	1	Queens County	11356	
Colliers	1	Otsego County		
Colliersville	1	Otsego County	13747	
Collingwood	1	Onondaga County	13084	
Collingwood Estates	1	Niagara County	14174	
Collins	1	Erie County	14034	
Collins Center	1	Erie County	14035	
Collins Landing	1	Jefferson County	13607	
Collinsville	1	Lewis County	13433	
Colonial Acres	2	Albany County	12077	
Colonial Acres	2	Westchester County	10583	
Colonial Heights	2	Dutchess County	12603	
Colonial Heights	2	Westchester County		
Colonial Park	2	New York County	10039	
Colonial Park	2	Oneida County	13440	
Colonial Springs	1	Suffolk County	11798	
Colonial Village	1	Niagara County	14092	
Colonie	1	Albany County	12212	
Colonie-Schenectady	1	Albany County		
Colonie-Watervliet	1	Albany County		
Colosse	1	Oswego County	13131	
Colton	1	St. Lawrence County	13625	
Columbia	1	Herkimer County		
Columbia Center	1	Herkimer County	13357	
Columbia University	1	New York County	10025	
Columbiaville	1	Columbia County	12050	
Columbus	1	Chenango County	13411	
Columbus Circle	1	New York County	10023	
Columbus Quarter	1	Chenango County		
Colvin	1	Onondaga County	13205	
Colvin Elmwood	1	Onondaga County	13205	
Commack	1	Suffolk County	11725	
Como	1	Cayuga County		
Comstock	1	Washington County	12821	
Comstock Corners	1	Niagara County		
Comstock Tract	1	Onondaga County	13027	
Concord	2	Erie County		
Concord	2	Richmond County	10304	
Conesus	1	Livingston County	14435	
Conesus Lake Junction	1	Livingston County		
Conesville	1	Schoharie County	12076	
Conewango	2	Cattaraugus County	14726	
Conewango	2	Chautauqua County		
Conewango Valley	2	Cattaraugus County	14726	
Conewango Valley	2	Chautauqua County	14726	
Coney Island	1	Kings County	11224	
Coney Island	1	St. Lawrence County		
Conger Corners	1	Oneida County	13480	
Congers	1	Rockland County	10920	
Conifer	1	St. Lawrence County	12986	
Conklin	1	Broome County	13748	
Conklin Center	1	Broome County		
Conklin Cove	1	Cayuga County		
Conklin Forks	1	Broome County	13903	
Conklingville	1	Saratoga County	12835	
Conklin Station	1	Broome County		
Connelly	1	Ulster County	12417	
Connelly Park	1	Chautauqua County	14710	
Conquest	1	Cayuga County	13140	
Constable	1	Franklin County	12926	
Constableville	1	Lewis County	13325	
Constantia	1	Oswego County	13044	
Constantia Center	1	Oswego County	13028	
Continental Village	1	Westchester County	10566	
Converse	1	St. Lawrence County		
Cook Corners	3	Chautauqua County		
Cook Corners	3	Montgomery County		
Cook Corners	3	St. Lawrence County	13625	
Cooksburg	1	Albany County	12469	
Cooks Falls	1	Delaware County	12776	
Cooks Mill	1	Franklin County		
Cookville	1	Genesee County	14036	
Cooley	1	Sullivan County		
Coolidge Beach	1	Niagara County	14172	
Coonrod	1	Oneida County	13440	
Coons	1	Saratoga County		
Co-op City	1	Bronx County	10475	
Cooper	1	New York County	10003	
Coopers	1	Steuben County		
Coopers Corners	1	Sullivan County		
Coopers Falls	1	St. Lawrence County		
Coopers Plains	1	Steuben County	14827	
Cooperstown	1	Otsego County	13326	
Cooperstown Junction	1	Otsego County	12116	
Coopersville	2	Clinton County	12919	
Coopersville	2	Livingston County	14517	
Copake	1	Columbia County	12516	
Copake Falls	1	Columbia County	12517	
Copake Lake	1	Columbia County	12521	
Copenhagen	1	Lewis County	13626	
Copiague	1	Suffolk County	11726	
Coram	1	Suffolk County	11727	
Corbett	1	Delaware County	13755	
Corbettsville	1	Broome County	13749	
Cordova	1	Chautauqua County		
Coreys	1	Franklin County	12986	
Corfu	1	Genesee County	14036	
Corinth	1	Saratoga County	12822	
Cork	1	Fulton County		
Cornell	1	Bronx County	10473	
Corner	1	Ulster County		
Corners	1	Tompkins County	14850	
Corning (city)	1	Steuben County	14830	
Corning Manor	1	Steuben County	14830	
Cornwall	1	Orange County	12518	
Cornwall Landing	1	Orange County	12520	
Cornwall-on-Hudson	1	Orange County	12520	
Cornwallville	1	Greene County	12418	
Corona	1	Queens County	11368	
Corrado Corners	1	Herkimer County		
Cortland	1	Cortland County	13045	
Cortlandt Manor	1	Westchester County	10566	
Cortlandville	1	Cortland County		
Cortland West	1	Cortland County		
Corwin	1	Niagara County		
Cosmos Heights	1	Cortland County	13045	
Cossayuna	1	Washington County	12823	
Cossayuna Lake	1	Washington County	12823	
Coss Corners	1	Steuben County	14810	
Cottage	1	Cattaraugus County	14138	
Cottage City	1	Ontario County	14424	
Cottage Park	1	Chautauqua County	14750	
Cottam Hill	1	Dutchess County		
Cottekill	1	Ulster County	12419	
Cottons	1	Madison County		
Cottonwood Cove	1	Livingston County		
Cottonwood Point	1	Livingston County	14435	
Country Knolls	1	Saratoga County	12019	
Country Life Press	1	Nassau County	11530	
Country Ridge Estates	1	Westchester County	10573	
County Line	2	Niagara County	14098	
County Line	2	Orleans County	14098	
Couse	1	Rensselaer County	12061	
Cove Neck	1	Nassau County	11771	
Coventry	1	Chenango County	13778	
Coventryville	1	Chenango County	13733	
Covert	1	Seneca County	14847	
Coveville	1	Saratoga County		
Coveytown Corners	1	Franklin County	12917	
Covington	1	Wyoming County	14525	
Cowles Settlement	1	Cortland County		
Cowlesville	1	Wyoming County	14037	
Coxsackie	1	Greene County	12051	
Crab Meadow	1	Suffolk County		
Crafts	1	Putnam County	10512	
Cragsmoor	1	Ulster County	12420	
Craigie Clair	1	Sullivan County		
Craigs	1	Livingston County	14525	
Craigville	1	Orange County	10918	
Crains Mills	1	Cortland County	13158	
Cranberry Creek	1	Fulton County	12117	
Cranberry Lake	1	St. Lawrence County	12927	
Crandall Corners	1	Washington County	12154	
Cranes Corners	1	Herkimer County	13340	
Crane Street	1	Schenectady County	12303	
Cranesville	1	Montgomery County	12010	
Cranford	1	Bronx County	10470	
Crary Mills	1	St. Lawrence County	13617	
Craryville	1	Columbia County	12521	
Craterclub	1	Essex County	12936	
Crawford	2	Orange County		
Crawford	2	Ulster County		
Creeklocks	1	Ulster County	12411	
Creekside	1	Erie County	14110	
Crescent	2	Albany County		
Crescent	2	Saratoga County	12188	
Crescent Beach	2	Monroe County	14612	
Crescent Beach	2	Richmond County	10301	
Crescent Park	1	Montgomery County		
Crescent Station	1	Albany County		
Crestview	1	Cattaraugus County		
Crest View Heights	1	Tioga County	13760	
Crestwood	1	Westchester County	10707	
Crestwood Gardens	1	Westchester County		
Crittenden	2	Erie County	14038	
Crittenden	2	Monroe County		
Crocketts	1	Cayuga County	13156	
Crofts Corners	1	Putnam County	10579	
Croghan	1	Lewis County	13327	
Crompond	1	Westchester County	10517	
Cronomer Valley	1	Orange County		
Cropseyville	1	Rensselaer County	12052	
Crosby	1	Yates County		
Crosbyside	1	Warren County		
Cross River	1	Westchester County	10518	
Cross Roads	1	Cayuga County		
Cross Roads Estates	1	Westchester County	10598	
Croton	1	Schuyler County	14864	
Crotona Park	1	Bronx County	10460	
Croton Falls	1	Westchester County	10519	
Croton-on-Hudson	1	Westchester County	10520	
Crotonville	1	Westchester County	10562	
Crown Heights	1	Essex County		
Crowningshield	1	Essex County		
Crown Point Center	1	Essex County	12928	
Crown Village	1	Nassau County	11762	
Crugers	1	Westchester County	10521	
Crum Creek	1	Fulton County	13452	
Crum Town	1	Tioga County		
Crystal Beach	1	Ontario County		
Crystal Brook	1	Suffolk County	11766	
Crystal Dale	1	Lewis County	13367	
Crystal Lake	2	Albany County	12147	
Crystal Lake	2	Cattaraugus County	14060	
Crystal Run	1	Orange County		
Crystal Spring	1	Yates County		
Cuba	1	Allegany County	14727	
Cuddebackville	1	Orange County	12729	
Cullen	1	Herkimer County	13439	
Culvertown	1	Sullivan County		
Cumberland Head	1	Clinton County	12901	
Cumminsville	1	Livingston County	14437	
Curriers	1	Wyoming County	14009	
Curry	1	Sullivan County	12765	
Currytown	1	Montgomery County	12166	
Curtis	2	Herkimer County		
Curtis	2	Steuben County	14821	
Cutchogue	1	Suffolk County	11935	
Cutchogue-New Suffolk	1	Suffolk County		
Cutchogue Station	1	Suffolk County		
Cutting	1	Chautauqua County	14724	
Cuyler	1	Cortland County	13050	
Cuylerville	1	Livingston County	14481	
C.W. Post College	1	Nassau County		
Cypress Hills	1	Kings County	11208	
