= Haines Memorial State Park =

State park in Bristol County, Rhode Island

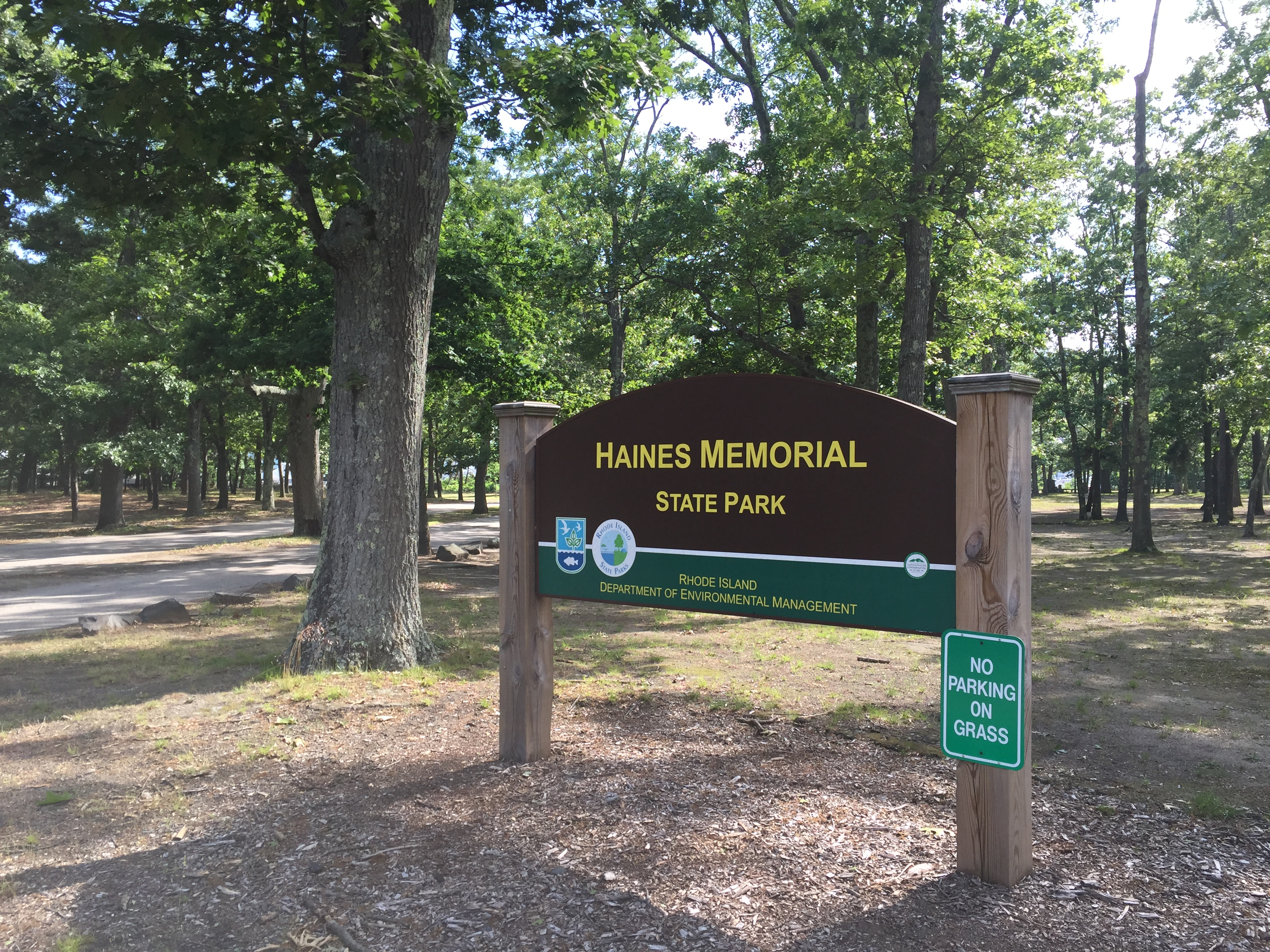

- Location within Rhode Island
- Interactive map of Haines Memorial State Park
- Location: Barrington, Rhode Island, United States
- Coordinates: 41°45′09″N 71°20′23″W
- Area: 101.7 acres (41.2 ha)
- Elevation: 43 ft (13 m)
- Established: 1911
- Named for: Dr. George B. Haines
- Administrator: Rhode Island Department of Environmental Management, Division of Parks & Recreation
- Website: Official website
- Rhode Island State Parks

Haines Memorial State Park is public recreation area in the town of Barrington on the northeastern side of Narragansett Bay, six miles (9.7 km) south of East Providence, Rhode Island. The state park offers picnicking, play fields, fishing and boating facilities, and is a stop on the East Bay Bike Path.

== History ==
The site of Haines Memorial State Park was donated by the estate of Dr. George B. Haines (1843-1910), a doctor who practiced medicine in Valley Falls, in Cumberland, and was a public health officer there. Haines suffered from asthma, and was a proponent of the healthy benefits of fresh air.

Haines purchased the Humphrey Farm in 1909, a "wooded retreat" of 83 acres, and lived there until his sudden death the following year. Haines' sister Ida then sold the property to the Rhode Island Metropolitan Park Commission for one dollar, in accordance with the doctor's wish that the land be used for "parks, parkway, or boulevard uses only."

Initially, the park featured picnic groves and ball fields, and was accessible by train or trolley from Bristol. The train tracks later became the East Bay Bicycle Path, which runs through the park.

Between 1911 and 1915, the Park Commission increased the size of the park to 101.7 acres. In the 1930s, the Civilian Conservation Corps sculpted the beach for the enhanced enjoyment of bathers, built fireplaces and a boat ramp, and created a pedestrian bridge that connected the park with Crescent Park until it was destroyed in the 1938 New England Hurricane. A bath house was added in 1940, and a seasonal farmers market began in 2002.

== Activities and amenities ==
The park's boat ramp provides access to Bullock Cove, from which boaters can reach the lower Providence River and the headwaters of Narragansett Bay.
