= Riverside, Rhode Island =

Area of East Providence, Rhode Island, US

Coordinates: 41°46′02″N 71°21′53″W

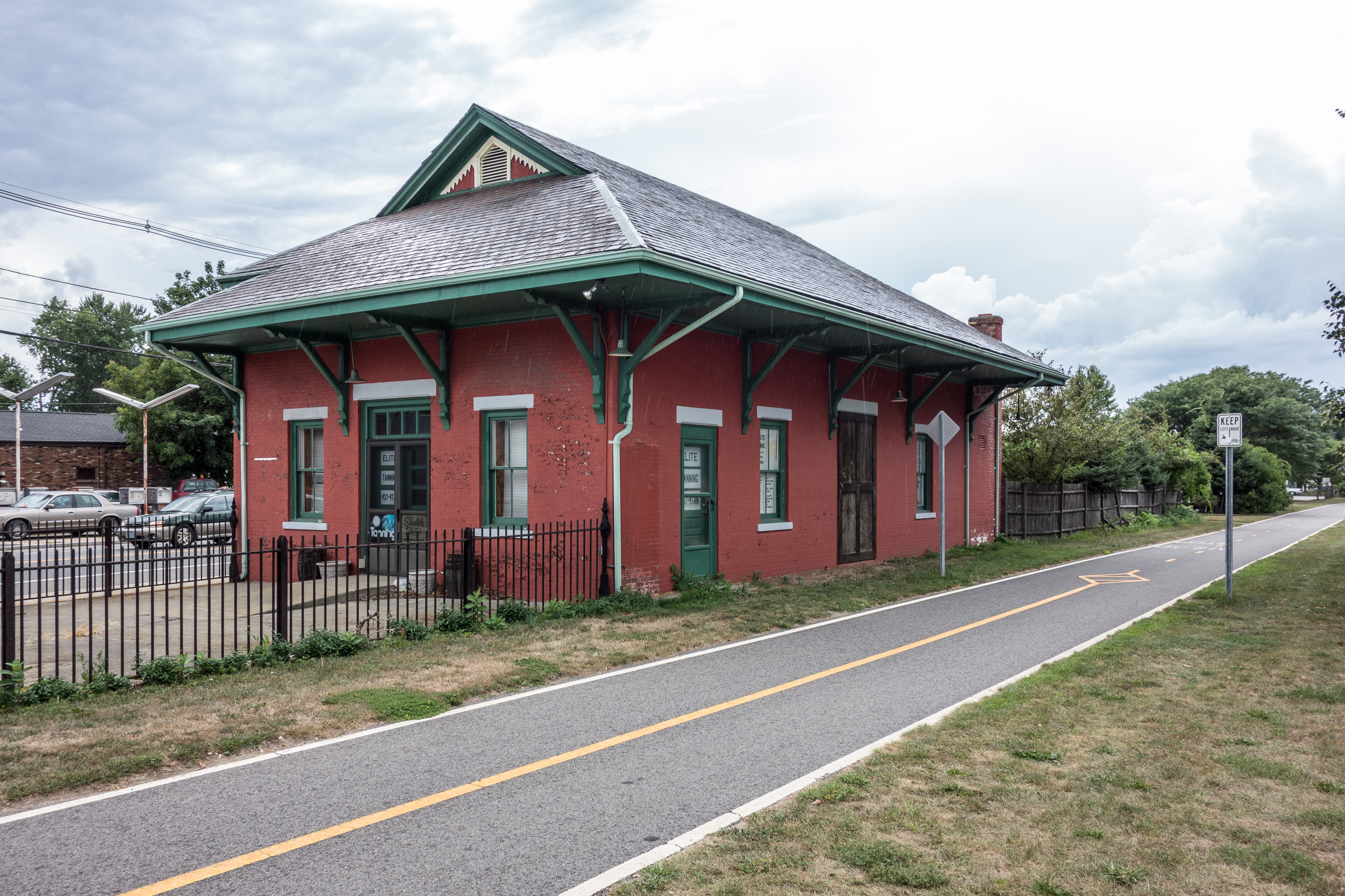
The old Riverside station on the East Bay Bike Path

Riverside is a neighborhood in the city of East Providence in the U.S. state of Rhode Island. Despite not being an incorporated city, Riverside has its own zip code, 02915, and is an acceptable mailing address according to the United States Postal Service. Riverside has a population of approximately 20,000 people.

Adjoining Riverside are the town of Barrington in Bristol County to the south, Narragansett Bay to the west, the rest of East Providence to the north, and the Runnins River and Seekonk, Massachusetts to the east.

== History ==
Riverside, known as Cedar Grove until 1878, was originally a farming and fishing area. Many of the streets south of Lincoln Ave are named after trees.

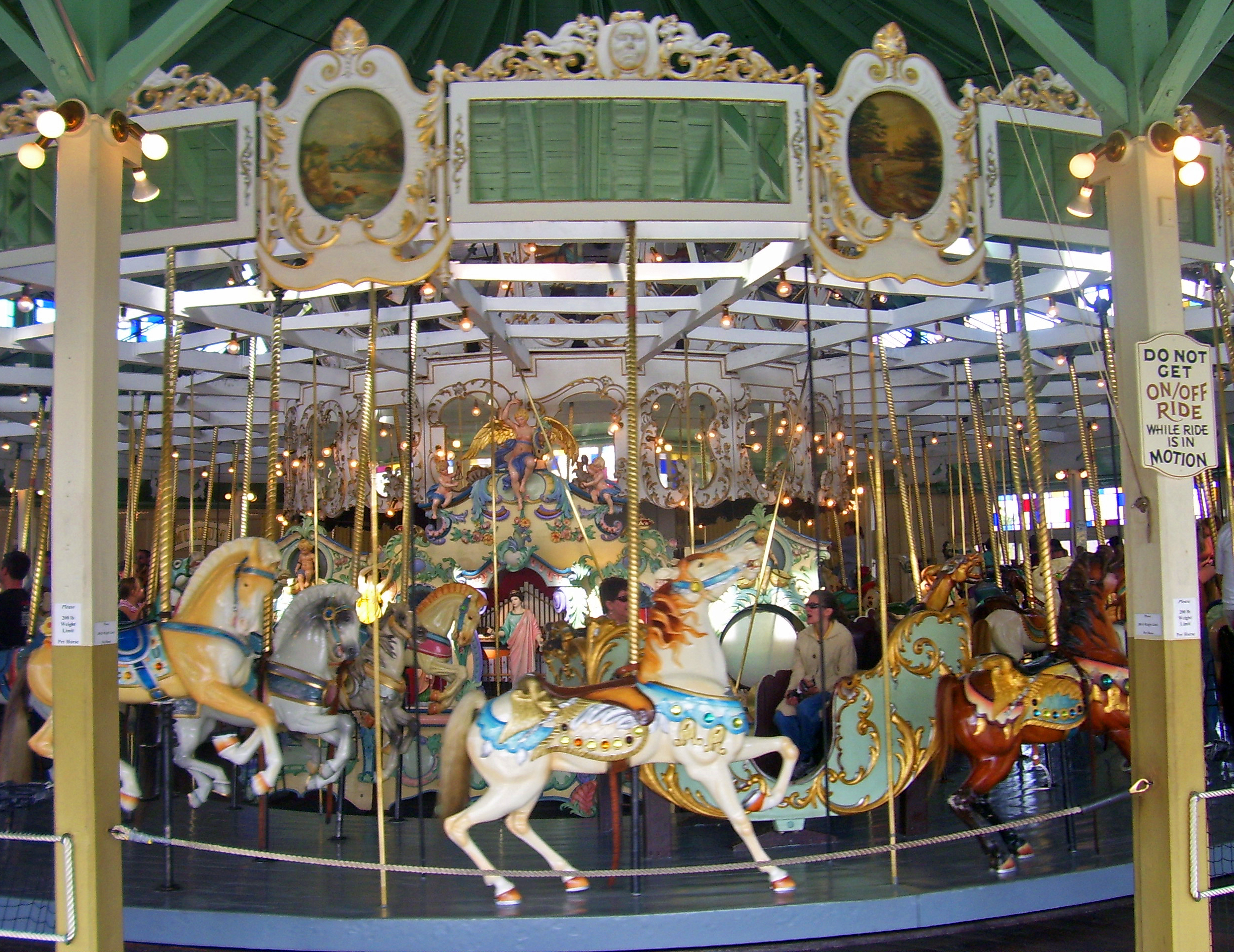
Crescent Park Carousel

Riverside most notably became a tourist attraction in the late 19th and early 20th century due to the presence of Crescent Park Amusement Park, known as the “Coney Island of the East”. The 50-acre park operated from 1886 until 1979, and was famous for its Rhode Island Shore Dinners as well as the Alhambra Ballroom, where famous Big Bands played, and the bustling midway which included roller coasters, kiddie land, rides and games. Although the park is now gone, the famous 1895 Crescent Park Looff Carousel has been preserved and continues in operation every summer. The Carousel is nationally recognized as a true masterpiece of wood sculpture. Originally built as a showcase for prospective buyers, it is the largest and most elaborate of Looff's works.

Two other amusement parks sprang up in the early 1900s in Riverside. Boyden Heights and Vanity Fair each had a short run before closing down due to low attendance.

Many hotels, guest houses and shore dinner halls operated in Riverside in the late 19th century to accommodate the influx of summer visitors escaping the big city. Also available were several tent sites like Camp White and Camp Fuller. The Vue de l'Eau Hotel was built around 1860. The four-story Riverside Hotel boasted its own wharf and a huge ballroom overlooking the bay. After a few years, it was dismantled and shipped by barge to Nantucket. Pomham House opened in 1867 with its own wharf. The popular Silver Spring Hotel was opened two years later by developer, Hiram Maxfield. In addition to the hotel, it included a shore dinner hall and summer cottages.

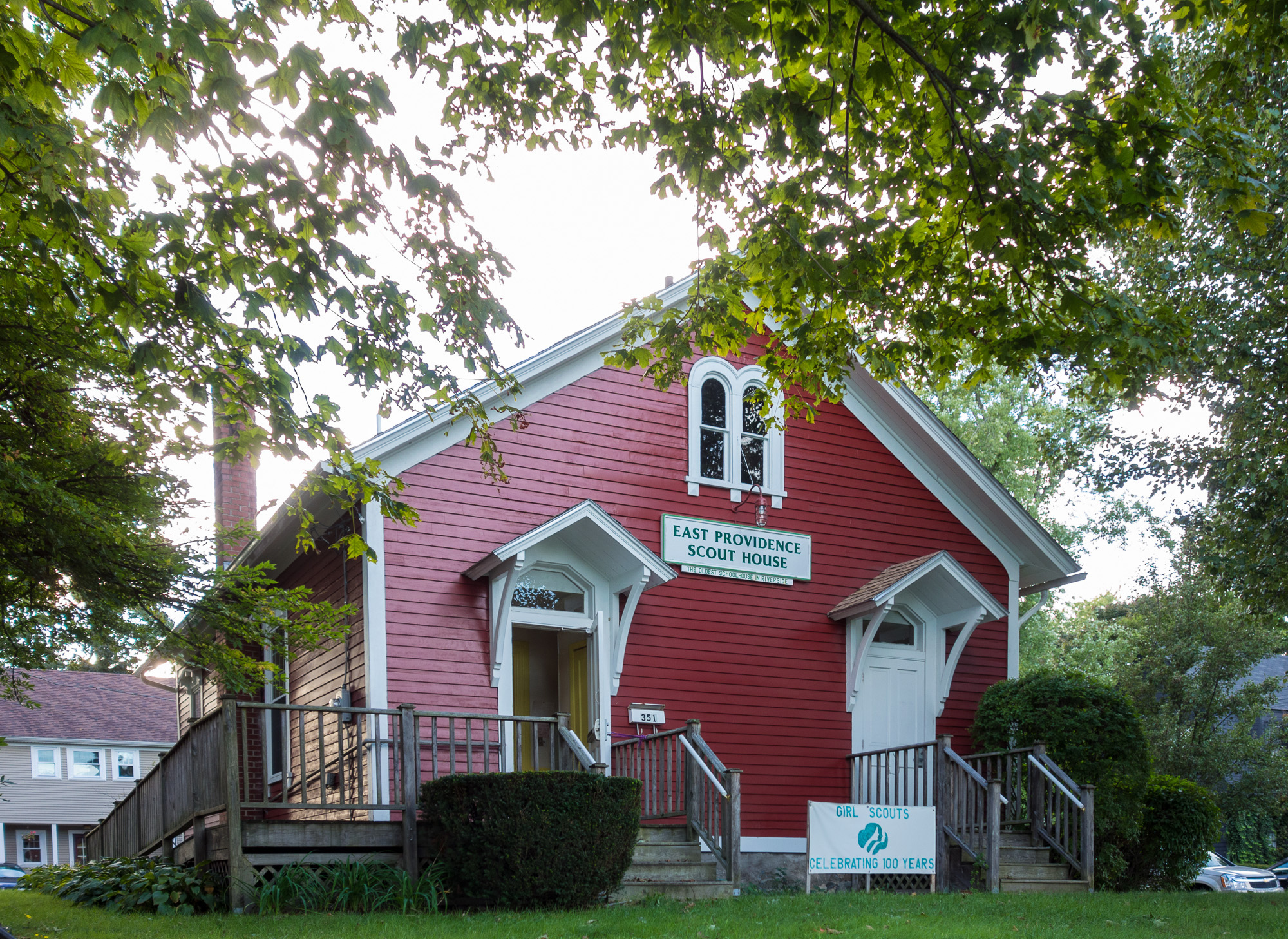
Girl Scout House

The Lyric Theater opened on Maple Avenue around 1920 and featured silent movies until 1928 when the theater became the second in the state to have talking pictures. Later named the Gilbert Stuart, it eventually closed as a theater. The Riverside Girl Scout House on Willett Avenue, built around 1870, is the oldest school still standing in East Providence. It was known as District 6 Schoolhouse.

Hockey star and NHL / U.S. Olympic hockey coach Ron Wilson lived in Riverside, at 47 Lottie Drive, from the ages of 12 until he was drafted by the Toronto Maple Leafs.

Today, it is a diverse community with several distinct neighborhoods.

== Tourism ==
The historic Little Neck Cemetery contains the grave of Captain Thomas Willett, the first English mayor of New York City (1665) and Elizabeth Tilley Howland (d.1687) who was a passenger as a child on the Mayflower.

The Squantum Club was founded in 1872 and many historic buildings are on the grounds. Its architectural uniqueness is noted on the National Register of Historic Places. The Colonial Revival Club House was built in 1900 and the one-story brick Bake House goes back to 1889. The association, with a diverse membership of area business leaders, hosts member and non-member events, is a famous wedding venue and still operates today.

Riversidians were known for harvesting clams, quahogs, and oysters from the beaches and surrounding waters. They became known as "Clam-diggers".

Narragansett Terrace, in the extreme south of town, was the site of many summer cottages for wealthy residents, including Governor Case. This peninsula afforded a grand view of Narragansett Bay. Bullock's Cove, nestled between the Terrace and Bay Spring, offered mooring sites for small boats. From its shore, one can see Barrington, Warren, Bristol, Warwick, Cranston, and Providence.

In the past decade, East Providence has considered many redevelopment projects in and around Riverside Square.

The largest landowner for many years in Riverside was ExxonMobil, until their land was sold to Global Partners LP in 2024, a corporation based in Waltham, Massachusetts. There are also banking call centers for Bank of America and Citizens Bank. It is also home to Bradley Hospital and the Silver Spring Golf Course.

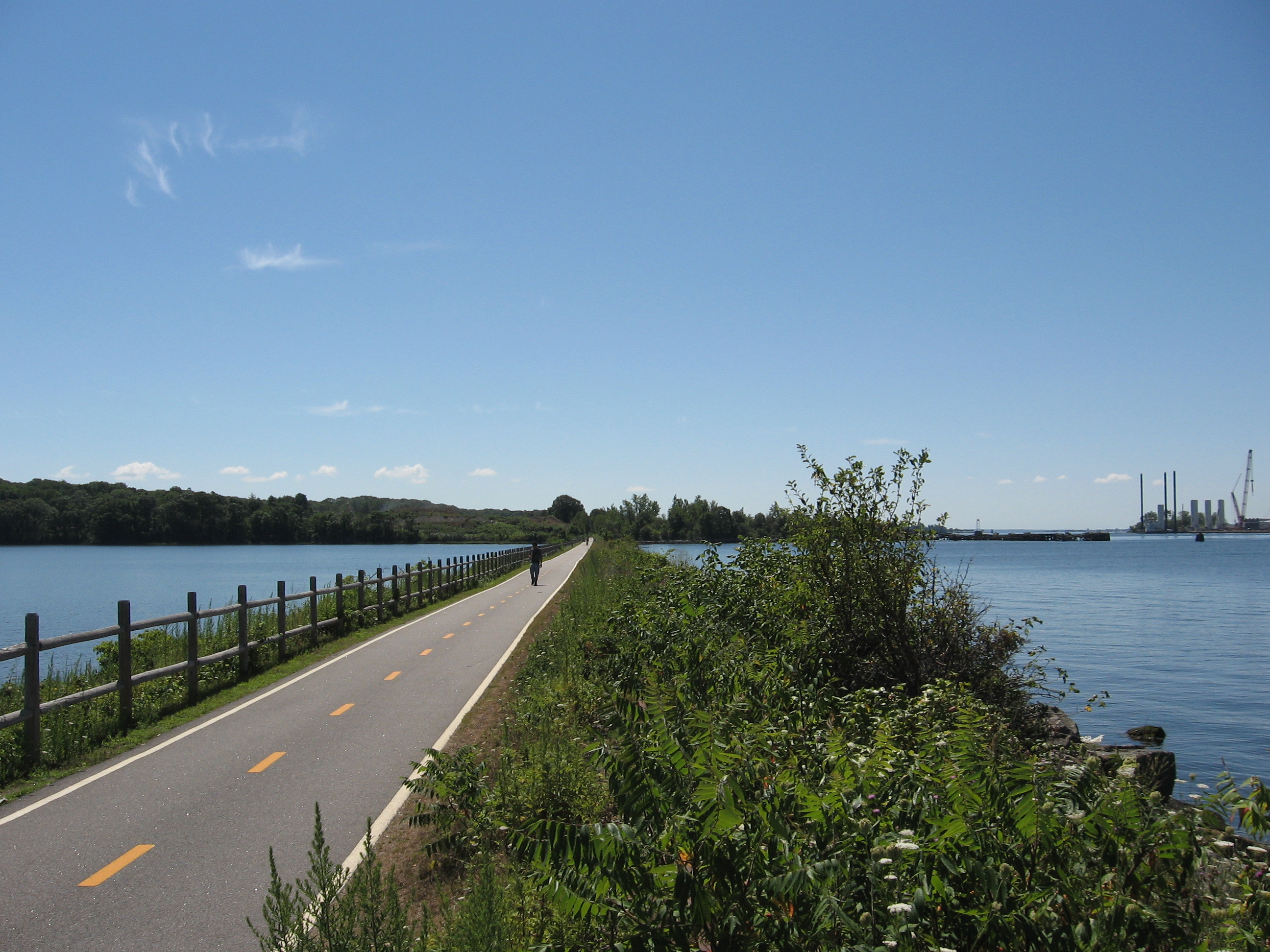
East Bay Bike Path

The major roads through Riverside are the Wampanoag Trail (RI Route 114) connecting East Providence to Bristol County and Willett Ave (RI Route 103), named after Thomas Willett.

The East Bay Bike Path runs through the community, connecting Riverside with the rest of the city of East Providence, providing bike access extending northwesterly to Providence, and southerly through Barrington, eventually terminating in Bristol.

== Notable schools ==
- Alice Mary Waddington Elementary School
- Meadowcrest Elementary School
- Oldham Elementary School
- Riverside Middle School
- St. Mary Academy – Bay View
- St. Brendan School

== Notable public places ==
- Crescent Park
- Sabin Point Park
- Riverside Coyote Mural
- Willett Pond
- Grassy Plains Park
- Haines Park

== National Register of Historic Places listings in Riverside ==
- Crescent Park Looff Carousel (National Historic Landmark)
- Elm Tree Plat Historic District
- James Dennis House
- District 6 Schoolhouse
- Little Neck Cemetery
- Pomham Rocks Light Station
- Rose Land Park Plat Historic District
- Squantum Association
