= St. Brendan School =

Location
- 55 Turner Ave. Riverside, Rhode Island 02915; United States
- 41°46′15.8″N 71°21′30.8″W

Information
- Type: Private, Coeducational
- Religious affiliation: Roman Catholic
- Established: 1909
- Closed: 2009
- Principal: Joseph Renzuli (at time of closing)
- Teaching staff: 12
- Grades: K-8
- Colors: Green and White

St. Brendan School was a Roman Catholic, coeducational, college preparatory school in Riverside, Rhode Island, United States.

== Founding ==
St. Brendan Parish in Riverside, Rhode Island was established in 1889. In 1909, it became a priority to build a school that would reinforce the Catholic faith in the lives of the children of the parish as well as give them a well-rounded education in all secular subjects. The Third Plenary Council of Baltimore had mandated this a priority in 1884, which recognized that the public school system was neither designed for not capable of strengthening religious faiths in a pluralistic society. To provide Catholic education, funds were raised from parishioners of the parish.

In the early 1930s the pastor arranged for many of the parish children to attend St. Mary Academy at Bay View, a small private school staffed by the Sisters of Mercy. These parish children formed a nucleus for the future St. Brendan School. When space became limited at Bay View, the pastor was able to procure the old Turner Avenue School from the City of East Providence, and in September 1943, six grades were opened in the newly named St. Brendan School. Seven Sisters of Mercy, the first principal being Sister Mary Vincent, staffed it. At this time the Sisters were moved into a newly opened convent across the street from the school.

== History ==
In May 1955, ground was broken for the new, sixteen-classroom school. In 1956, the students and faculty moved into the new school which is the one still in use today. In that first year the enrollment was such that an extra first grade was needed.

In July 1957, fire destroyed the roof of the church, which had to be demolished and the school gymnasium was used as the parish church until a new church structure could be built.

The first graduation for a class that had completed eight grades at St. Brendan School was held on June 12, 1964. There were now fifteen religious and two lay teachers. Student enrollment in 1966 was 585, an all-time high. During the 1960s and 1970s, there was a decline in religious faculty numbers because of fewer vocations and the fact that religious sisters were branching out into other fields. The East Providence School system supplied three math and science teachers during this time to help fill the gap. The decrease in religious faculty continued through the 1980s, until the entire faculty was made up of lay teachers.

Parishioners were involved in the school through work with the Parent Council. The first School Board was formed in 1998.

== Closing ==
In March 2009, St. Brendan Parish announced the closing of the school. The Parish attributed the closing to declining enrollment and a growing financial deficit. The School Board, Parish Finance Council and the Parish Trustees, were forced to seek permission from the Bishop of Providence to borrow a large sum of money to complete the final 2008–2009 academic year and discontinue operations. At the time of closing there were only 95 students registered for the 2009–2010 school year.
