= Cheektowaga (CDP), New York =

Cheektowaga, New York
- Census-designated place
- Location in Erie County and the state of New York.
- Coordinates: 42°54′43″N 78°45′35″W
- Country: United States
- State: New York
- County: Erie
- Town: Cheektowaga

Area
  - Total: 25.43 sq mi (65.87 km^{2})
  - Land: 25.37 sq mi (65.72 km^{2})
  - Water: 0.058 sq mi (0.15 km^{2})
- Elevation: 650 ft (198 m)

Population (2020)
  - Total: 76,829
  - Density: 3,027.6/sq mi (1,168.96/km^{2})
- Time zone: UTC-5 (Eastern (EST))
  - Summer (DST): UTC-4 (EDT)
- ZIP Codes: 14225, 14227, 14206, 14215 (Cheektowaga); 14211 (Buffalo); 14043 (Depew)
- Area code: 716
- FIPS code: 36-15000
- GNIS feature ID: 0971948

Cheektowaga is a suburban community and census-designated place (CDP) in Erie County, New York, United States. The population was 75,178 at the 2010 census, making it the most populous census-designated place in New York. It is within the town of Cheektowaga. The CDP includes Buffalo Niagara International Airport.

Cheektowaga is part of the Buffalo-Niagara Falls metropolitan area.

== Geography ==
Cheektowaga is located at 42°54′43″N 78°45′34″W (42.911958, -78.759679).

According to the United States Census Bureau, the CDP has a total area of 25.5 square miles (65.9 km^{2}), all land.

== Demographics ==
Historical population
| Census | Pop. | Note | %± |
|---|---|---|---|
| 1980 | 92,145 | | — |
| 1990 | 84,387 | | −8.4% |
| 2000 | 79,988 | | −5.2% |
| 2010 | 75,178 | | −6.0% |
| 2020 | 76,829 | | 2.2% |
Historical Population Figures; Cheektowaga (CDP)

As of the census of 2000, there were 79,988 people, 34,188 households, and 21,914 families residing in the CDP. The population density was 3,142.9 inhabitants per square mile (1,213.5/km^{2}). There were 35,829 housing units at an average density of 1,407.8 per square mile (543.6/km^{2}). The racial makeup of the CDP was 94.37% White, 3.35% Black or African American, 0.17% Native American, 1.04% Asian, 0.01% Pacific Islander, 0.28% from other races, and 0.79% from two or more races. Hispanic or Latino of any race were 0.99% of the population.

There were 34,188 households, out of which 25.5% had children under the age of 18 living with them, 49.2% were married couples living together, 11.4% had a female householder with no husband present, and 35.9% were non-families. 30.9% of all households were made up of individuals, and 15.6% had someone living alone who was 65 years of age or older. The average household size was 2.31 and the average family size was 2.91.

In the CDP, the population was spread out, with 20.6% under the age of 18, 7.2% from 18 to 24, 28.6% from 25 to 44, 23.0% from 45 to 64, and 20.6% who were 65 years of age or older. The median age was 41 years. For every 100 females, there were 88.0 males. For every 100 females age 18 and over, there were 83.9 males.

The median income for a household in the CDP was $37,928, and the median income for a family was $46,486. Males had a median income of $34,565 versus $25,415 for females. The per capita income for the CDP was $19,796. About 4.6% of families and 6.5% of the population were below the poverty line, including 8.5% of those under age 18 and 7.0% of those age 65 or over.

== See also ==
- Cheektowaga Northwest, a census-designated place recorded within the northwestern part of the area in 1960.
- Cheektowaga Southwest, a census-designated place recorded within the southwestern part of the area in 1960.
