= Bullock Cove =

Cove in the Narragansett Bay

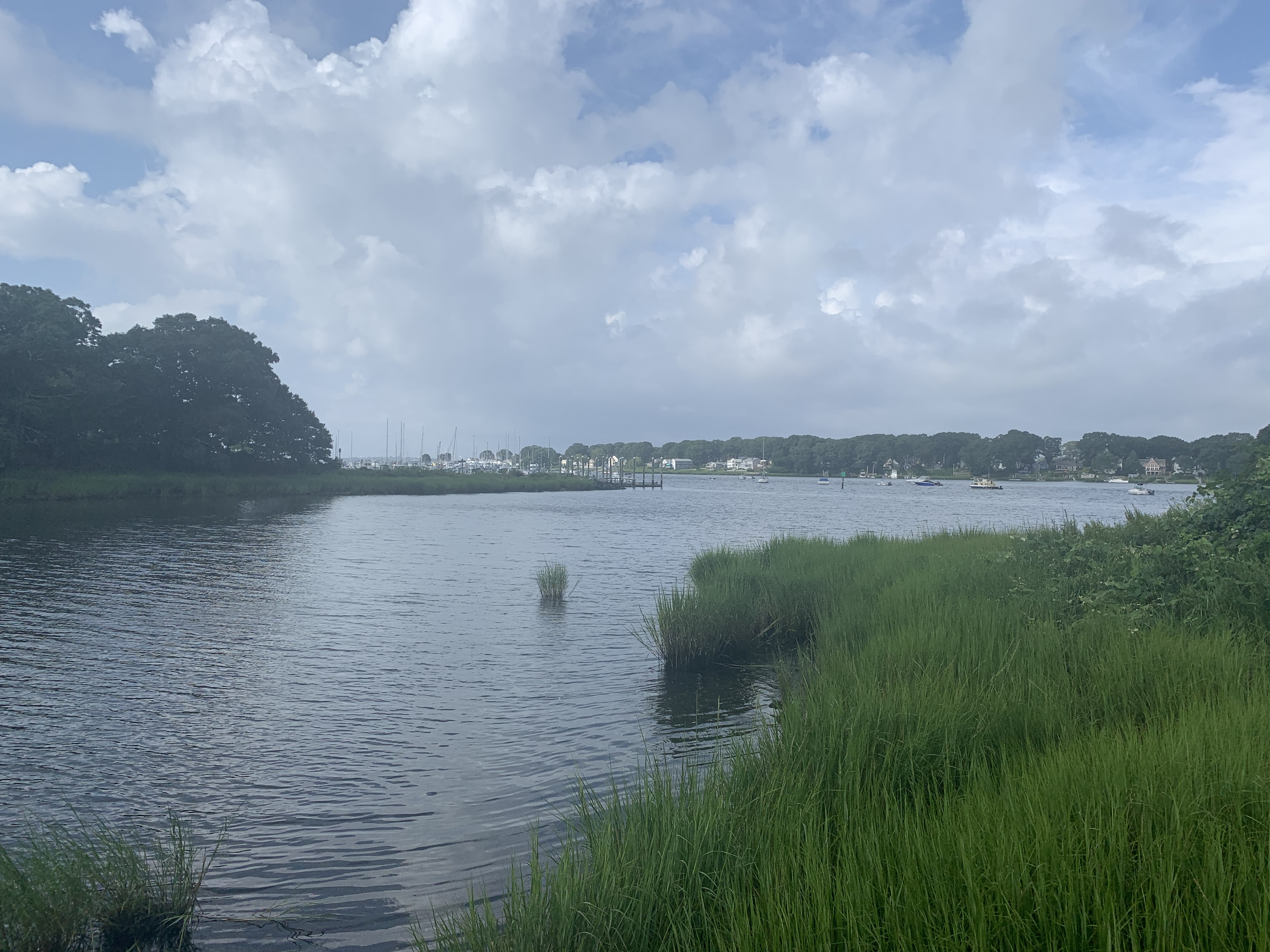
- Bullock Cove, as seen from the southern shore of Richmond Point, July 2024
- Location: Narragansett Bay, Rhode Island
- Coordinates: 41°45′11.9″N 71°21′16.2″W
- Type: Cove
- Part of: Naragansett Bay, Providence River

Location
- Interactive map of Bullock Cove

Bullock Cove, also known as Bullock's Cove, and Bullock's Point Cove, is a cove in the Narragansett Bay, Rhode Island, between the towns of East Providence and Barrington.

== History ==
Archaeological evidence indicates that the area around Bullock Cove was inhabited by Native American groups during the Middle Archaic period (circa 8000-6000 B.P.). Artifacts such as chipped stones and lithic tools have been found, as well as human skeletons, indicating the presence of early human activity. Sites around the upper Narragansett Bay, including Bullocks Cove, were significant for these early inhabitants, who engaged in activities like tool-making and possibly seasonal hunting and gathering.

With the arrival of European settlers, the area underwent significant changes. In 1655, Little Neck Cemetery was established near Bullocks Cove by the town of Rehoboth, Massachusetts, serving as a common burial ground for the early settlers of Wannamoisett, which now includes parts of East Providence and Barrington.

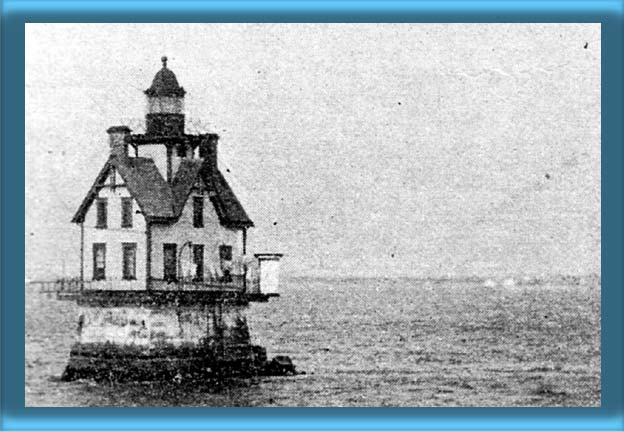
Bullock's Point Light in 1900

Between 1872 and 1876, the Bullock Point Light was constructed on the western shores of the cove. It was badly damaged during the 1938 New England hurricane, and the keeper, Andrew Zuius, was transferred to the Palmer Island Light, after the demolition of the remnants of the light.

Today, there are several homes on the cove, and three marinas. The unincorporated community of Riverside, a part of East Providence, sits on the northern shores of the cove. In addition, some parts of the East Bay Bike Path run near the shores of the cove.

== Ecology ==
The cove is home to several crustaceans, fish, and other aquatic wildlife. For example, the Chesapeake blue crabs are the focus of monitoring programs to assess their populations and ecological impact. The crabs are important ecologically and commercially, and efforts are ongoing to understand their population dynamics and habitat requirements in the face of changing environmental conditions.

Invasive species, particularly the Asian shore crab and the green crab, have significantly altered the local ecology. These crabs reproduce rapidly and compete with native species for resources. The Asian shore crab has become abundant, often outcompeting native crabs and affecting the local food web by preying on mussels and other small invertebrates.

The cove is also home to Black sea bass and other finfish that benefit from the abundance of prey such as the invasive crabs. The cove's sheltered waters provide a critical habitat for juvenile fish, offering protection and abundant food resources.

Oysters, particularly the Eastern oyster, are another important species found in Bullock's Cove. Historically, the region was known for its prolific oyster beds, and efforts are ongoing to restore and manage these populations. The cove also supports populations of quahogs, soft-shelled clams, and surf clams. Riverside residents were known for harvesting clams, quahogs, and oysters, from the beaches of Bullock Cove and the surrounding areas, and they were known as "clam-diggers".
