= Cossayuna, New York =

- Hamlet
- Location within New York Location within the United States
- Coordinates: 43°11′01″N 73°25′36″W
- Country: United States
- State: New York
- County: Washington
- Elevation: 476 ft (145 m)
- Time zone: UTC-5 (Eastern (EST))
  - Summer (DST): UTC-4 (EDT)
- ZIP code: 12823
- Area codes: 518 & 838
- GNIS feature ID: 947509

Cossayuna is a hamlet in Washington County, New York, United States. The community is 7.4 miles (11.9 km) north-northeast of Greenwich. Cossayuna has a post office with ZIP code 12823.
