= Cleverdale, New York =

- Hamlet
- Location within New York Location within the United States
- Coordinates: 43°28′38″N 73°38′33″W
- Country: United States
- State: New York
- County: Warren
- Elevation: 348 ft (106 m)
- Time zone: UTC-5 (Eastern (EST))
  - Summer (DST): UTC-4 (EDT)
- ZIP code: 12820
- Area codes: 518 & 838
- GNIS feature ID: 946862

Cleverdale is a hamlet in Warren County, New York, United States. The community is located on a peninsula along the south shore of Lake George, 5 miles (8.0 km) northeast of the village of Lake George. Cleverdale has a post office with ZIP code 12820.
