= Crescent Park (defunct amusement park) =

Former amusement park in Rhode Island, U.S.

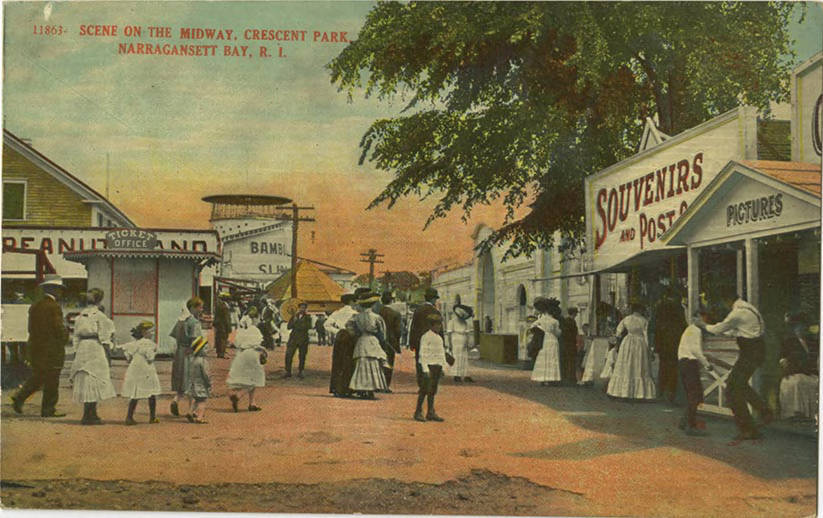
- Crescent Park postcard featuring the midway
- Interactive map of Crescent Park
- Location: 700 Bullocks Point Avenue; Riverside, Rhode Island, U.S.
- Coordinates: 41.756144°N 71.357833°W
- Status: Defunct
- Opened: 1886
- Closed: 1979 (carousel remains operational)
- Area: 49.7 acres (20.1 ha)

Crescent Park was an amusement park in Riverside, East Providence, Rhode Island that was operational from 1886 to 1979. Called the "Coney Island of the East," the nearly 50 acre park overlooked the Narragansett Bay on the west and Bullock Cove on the southeast. The park changed hands several times during its run, specifically in the 1960s and 1970s, before closing after the 1977 season due to financial problems, structural neglect, and local pollution of the bay. While the majority of the land has since been developed into a housing complex, the Crescent Park Looff Carousel, designed and built by Charles I.D. Looff, has been preserved and continues to run.

== History ==
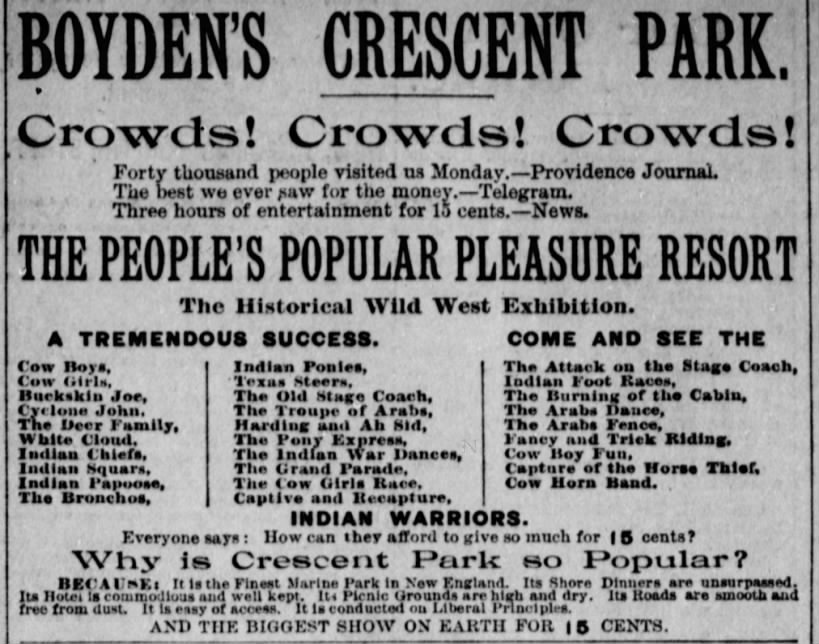
Ad in The Providence News (1892)

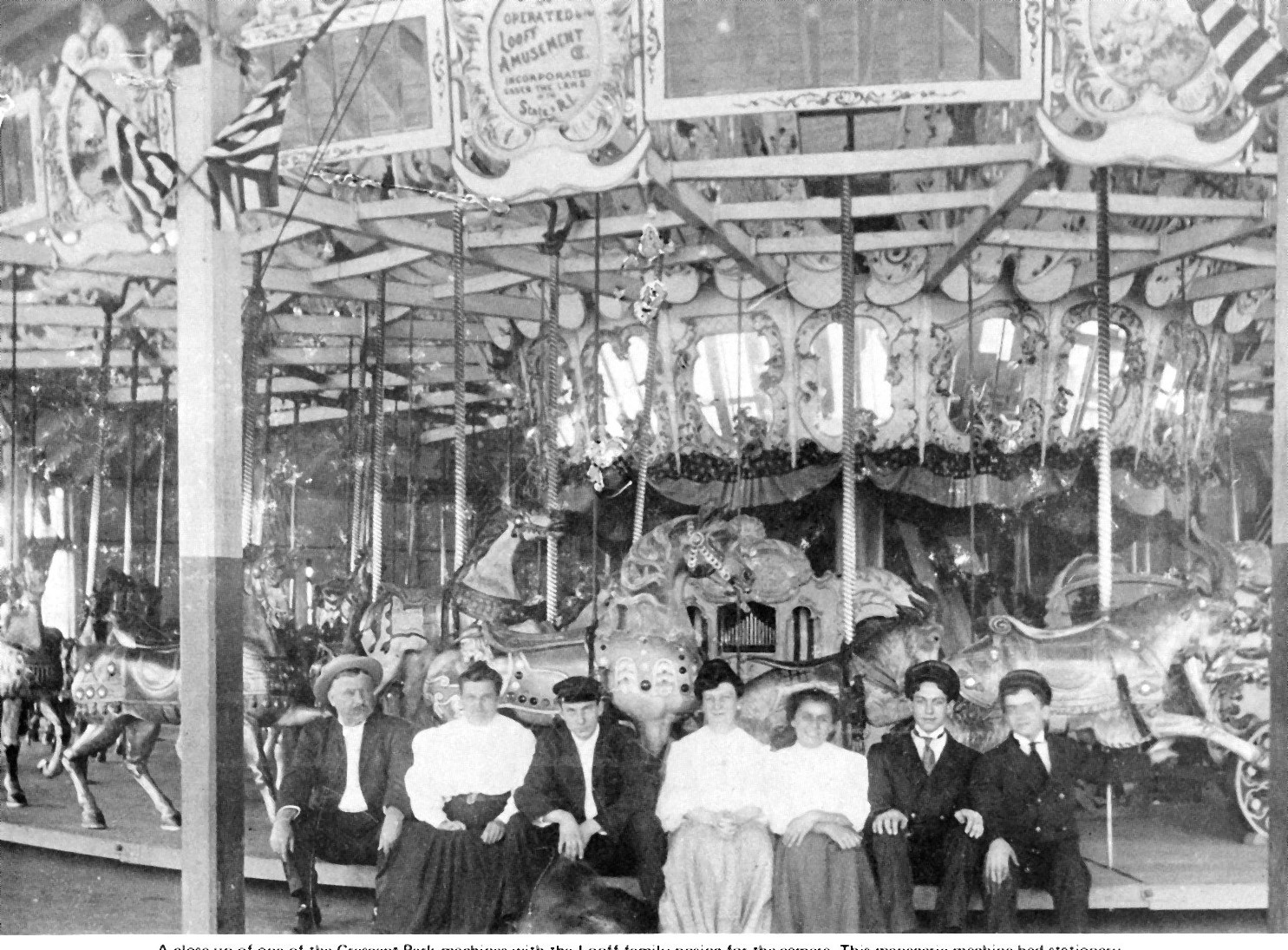
Charles I. D. Looff and family in front of the Crescent Park Carousel, c. 1905

In 1886, George B. Boyd signed a five-year lease for a lot on Narragansett Bay, just east of the Bullock's Point Hotel in Riverside, Rhode Island. He built an amusement park on the land, which he named after the crescent shape of the beach. He later purchased the hotel and renamed it the Crescent Park Hotel, making the sprawl a full resort. In 1892, Charles I. D. Looff installed the park's first carousel, which was built on pylons over the beach, next to the 400 foot (120 m) pier. It was 50 feet (15 m) in diameter and had three rows of horses, which could accommodate 70 riders. At this time, transportation began to run between Providence and the park by land. Steamboats were also dropping visitors off at the pier. By August 1892, these boats were leaving from Providence once an hour during the week and every 30 minutes over the weekends. At its height, boats were reportedly landing every 20 minutes. By 1893, the park had become the second most popular amusement park after Rocky Point, which sat on the opposite shore of the Bay in Warwick. In mid-July 1894, Providence News reported a turnout of 20,000 visitors on a single Sunday; estimates over the next several years sat between 50,000 and 75,000 over weekends in the summer.

Attractions in 1894 included chariot and hurdle competitions, aerial gymnasts, and a Japanese circus troupe from Tokyo, and the park was popular for its dinner hall and clambakes, bandstands, roller skating hall, boat rides, midway, and rides. Looff built the park's second and most iconic carousel in 1895. The Crescent Park Looff Carousel has 61 hand-carved horses, 1 camel, 4 chariots, and a German band organ built by A. Ruth & Sohn. It was originally powered by steam but was later updated to run on an electric motor. Looff also built the park's first roller coaster, the Flying Toboggan. In 1900, LaMarcus Thompson built a scenic railway next to the Looff carousel.

By the end of the 19th century, Crescent Park had the largest dance hall on the East Coast and was, according to the Providence Journal of Commerce, the largest shore resort under the proprietership of a single person anywhere in the world. Boyden sold the park to liquor dealers Jeremiah Sullivan and Robert Tobin of East Providence in 1898. He remained as manager for one season but had left the park altogether by 1901, when the park went to the Hope Land Company, owned by the Fred and William Dexter. In 1902, Fred Dexter oversaw the building of the New England Association of Arts and Crafts Hall, a 40,000 sq ft (3,700 m^{2}) exhibition hall on the midway that later evolved into a music hall before becoming the Alhambra Ballroom. After Dexter's death, Hope Land appointed Randall A. Harrington, owner of Rocky Point Park since 1888, as park manager.

In 1905, Charles Looff moved his carousel factory from Brooklyn to Crescent Park, where he built a workshop onto the north side of the carousel building. He converted the standing carousel horses to "jumpers" and used them to showcase his range of skills to potential buyers from across the country. He moved to Long Beach, California in 1910, leaving his son Charles Jr. and daughter Helen to manage the park's operations. Charles Jr. oversaw the construction of the new Shore Dinner Hall in 1914, expanding its capacity to 2,000, and the addition of a wax museum to the midway. He negotiated ownership of the park with the new owners, Beacon Manufacturing, who mortgaged the park to him following Harrington's death in 1918. Charles Jr. added a roller skating rink and the Rivers of Venice dark ride, and renovated the Dance and Music Hall to become the Alhambra Ballroom. He also began operating a radio station, WKAD, from the park grounds in 1922. After his death in 1925, Beacon installed John Clare as park manager, a role he held for 20 years.

In 1935, the 40-room Crescent Park Hotel was demolished to make way for an additional parking lot. In 1938, the pier, some of the buildings, and the southern half of the Comet rollercoaster were destroyed during a hurricane. The Comet was rebuilt the following year but was closed during World War II, when a cable snapped and killed a U.S. Navy sailor. The park remained a popular place for sailors stationed at Newport to visit, though civilian visitor numbers suffered throughout the war.

The park changed hands again in 1951 when it was purchased by the Crescent Park Realty Company, headed by Arthur R. Simmons, Charles Looff Sr.'s grandson, and Frederick McCusker. Simmons and McCusker acquired the park for between $300,000 and $325,000. Over the next 15 years, new rides were added; the Alhambra Ballroom was renovated to become the Sugarberry Lounge; the candlepin bowling alley was converted into a cocktail lounge; and the kids' area of the park, Kiddieland, was improved and expanded. Free entertainment was also offered on the midway on Sunday afternoons. Attendance continued to decrease, due in part to polio epidemics as well as the opening of the theme park Disneyland, which "usher[ed] in a whole new era in outdoor entertainment," making amusement parks appear outdated. Further, Hurricane Carol in 1954 destroyed the pier and it was never rebuilt. In the early 1960s, the Satellite roller coaster was dismantled to make way for "new 'thrill' rides." The park, including the carousel, was bought by developer Melvin T. Berry in 1966. Berry intended to modernize the park.

The Alhambra Ballroom burned down in September 1969. While Berry did make improvements for the park, he sold the park to Bayside Recreation, a subsidiary of Fairbanks Industries, in 1969 for $350,000. Fairbanks announced it would petition to rezone the amusement park, allowing 15 acres to be converted into housing, while the remaining 35 acres would remain as-is for at least another year. The company operated the park in the early 1970s until they filed for Chapter 11 bankruptcy in 1975, giving up ownership to HNC Real Estate Investors, who operated the park for the 1976 season. The property was auctioned off in 1976 and sold for $490,000 to the Crescent Park Amusement Co., who installed Gilbane Properties as park managers. Crescent Park was officially shuttered in 1977. The property and rides, excluding the carousel, were auctioned off again in 1979 and purchased by the City of East Providence for $500,000. In 1982, real estate firm Kelly & Picerne purchased the property for $825,000 for residential development.

Part of the midway was destroyed in 1980 in what was suspected to be an arson fire. The Shore Dining Hall burned down in 1984. Remaining buildings have since been torn down.

== Preservation efforts ==
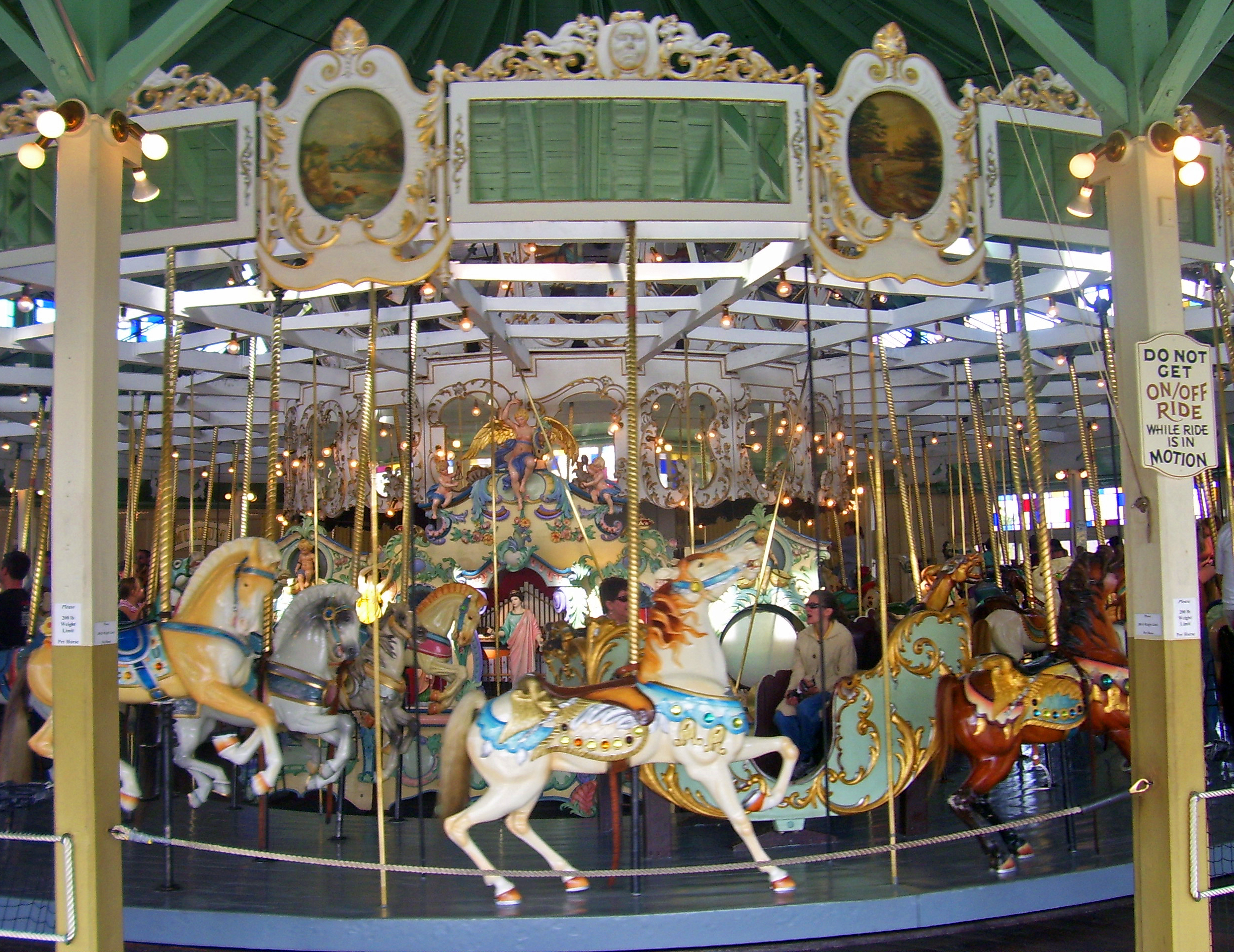
Crescent Park Looff Carousel (2008)

Concern over the future of the park's carousel grew as the park was closed down. Two organizations, Save Our Carousel and the Carousel Park Commission, were formed to preserve the Crescent Park Looff Carousel. The Crescent Park Five, as they were known, was made up of local residents Gail Durfee, Jobel Aguiar, Richard Lund, Linda McEntee, and Robin Peacock, who led the legal battle against the housing complex and the destruction of the carousel. They were represented by Arlene Violet. The courts finally reached the decision that the city would retain 7 acres of beachfront along the bay and 4 acres for the carousel itself. The remaining 39 acres would be used by Kelly & Picerne for low-income housing in a complex now called Crescent Park Manor.

In 1984, Representative Patrick Kennedy gave a $1 million grant to update the carousel. New foundation was laid, a sprinkler system was added, and the electric was rewired. The carousel reopened in July 1984 after several years in legal limbo. The Rhode Island General Assembly named the carousel the "State Jewel of American Folk Art" in 1985 and it was designated a National Historic Landmark by the National Park Service in 1987. It received the National Carousel Association's Historical Carousel Award in 1994. A $150,000 grant from the National Trust for Historic Preservation in 2000 allowed for further updates. The ring gear was replaced in 2010. East Providence City Council allocated $100,000 to repair the carousel in 2019 after it was found the structure was sinking into the sand, causing it to sway back and forth. Repairs and restoration were delayed due to the COVID-19 pandemic and the carousel did not reopen until 2022.

== Rides and attractions ==
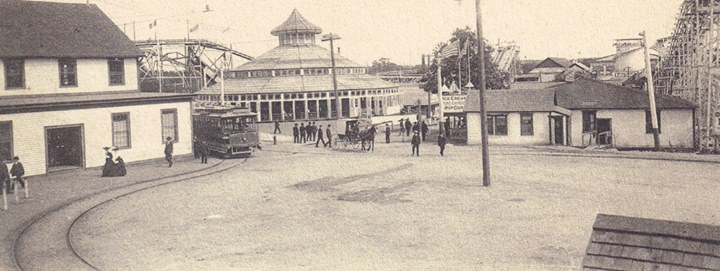
Crescent Park midway, with the Looff Carousel and railway on the left and the Flying Toboggan on the right (1905)

Rides and attractions at Crescent Park over its 93-year run included:

- Bamboo Slide, a tall wooden tower with a spiral slide
- Bandstands
- Bathing beach
- Balloon ascension
- Bicycle racing track (built in the late 19th century)
- Bubble Bounce
- Buggy ride by Herschell (purchased 1955)
- Candlepin bowling alley (until 1952)
- Crescent Park Looff Carousel (installed 1895)
- Comet rollercoaster
- Jolly Caterpillar from Herschell (purchased 1955)
- Circle Swing
- Eden Musee, a wax museum on the midway
- Ferris wheel
- Flying Eagle, a ride similar to a modern swing boat
- Flying Toboggan, the park's first rollercoaster
- Funhouse
- Haunted houses
- Miniature railroad (installed around 1910-1915)
- Penny arcade
- Photo booths
- Pony track
- Pretzel ride
- Riverboat Ride
- Rivers of Venice, a tunnel of love (added 1920s)
- Roller skating rink
- Roundup, also known as the Satellite (added 1950s/1960)
- Shoot the chute
- Silver Streak
- Sky Ride
- Steeplechase, arcade and funhouse
- The Turbo (added 1969/1970)
- Turnpike Ride (added 1950s/1960s)
- Tumble Bug (added between 1925-1945)
- Wild Mouse (added 1950s/1960s)
- Wild West shows
- Witching Waves, similar to modern bumper cars

== See also ==
- List of amusement parks in New England
- List of defunct amusement parks
