= Cameron Mills, New York =

Hamlet in the state of New York, United States

- Hamlet
- Location within New York Location within the United States
- Coordinates: 42°10′49″N 77°21′49″W
- Country: United States
- State: New York
- County: Steuben
- Elevation: 1,033 ft (315 m)
- Time zone: UTC-5 (Eastern (EST))
  - Summer (DST): UTC-4 (EDT)
- ZIP code: 14820
- Area code: 607
- GNIS feature ID: 969949

Cameron Mills is a hamlet in Steuben County, New York, United States. The community is located along the Canisteo River, 8.5 miles (13.7 km) northwest of Addison. Cameron Mills has a post office with ZIP code 14820, which opened on March 19, 1850.
