= Crittenden, New York =

Hamlet in New York, United States

Coordinates: 42°56′46″N 78°29′05″W

Crittenden is a small hamlet in the town of Alden in Erie County, New York, United States. In 1910 the Crittenden Creamery was located on Crittenden Road north of Genesee Street, Route 33. On January 31, 2011, the Crittenden Post Office 14038 was closed after 160 years of service. It was located at 3610 Crittenden Road.
