= Cheektowaga Northwest, New York =

Cheektowaga Northwest
- Former CDP
- Location within the state of New York
- Coordinates: 42°56′29″N 78°47′26″W
- Country: United States
- State: New York
- Counties: Erie
- Town: Cheektowaga

Area
  - Land: 6.90 sq mi (17.87 km^{2})

Population (1960)
  - Total: 52,362
  - Density: 7,589/sq mi (2,930/km^{2})
- Time zone: UTC-5 (Eastern (EST))
  - Summer (DST): UTC-4 (EDT)
- ZIP code: 14225
- Area code: 716
- FIPS code: 36-15022

Cheektowaga Northwest was a census-designated place within the northwestern part of the town of Cheektowaga in Erie County, New York during the 1960 United States census. The population recorded was 52,362. The census area dissolved in 1970, however the census area became part of Cheektowaga CDP in 1980, when the CDP recorded a population of 92,145. The ZIP code serving the area is 14225.

== Geography ==
Located at approximately 42.941599 north and 78.790565 west, the census area of Cheektowaga Northwest was bounded by the city of Buffalo to the west and the CDP of Eggertsville to the north. The land area of the CDP was 6.9 square miles.

== See also ==
- Cheektowaga (CDP)
- Cheektowaga Southwest
