= East Bay Bike Path =

Multi-use trail in Rhode Island

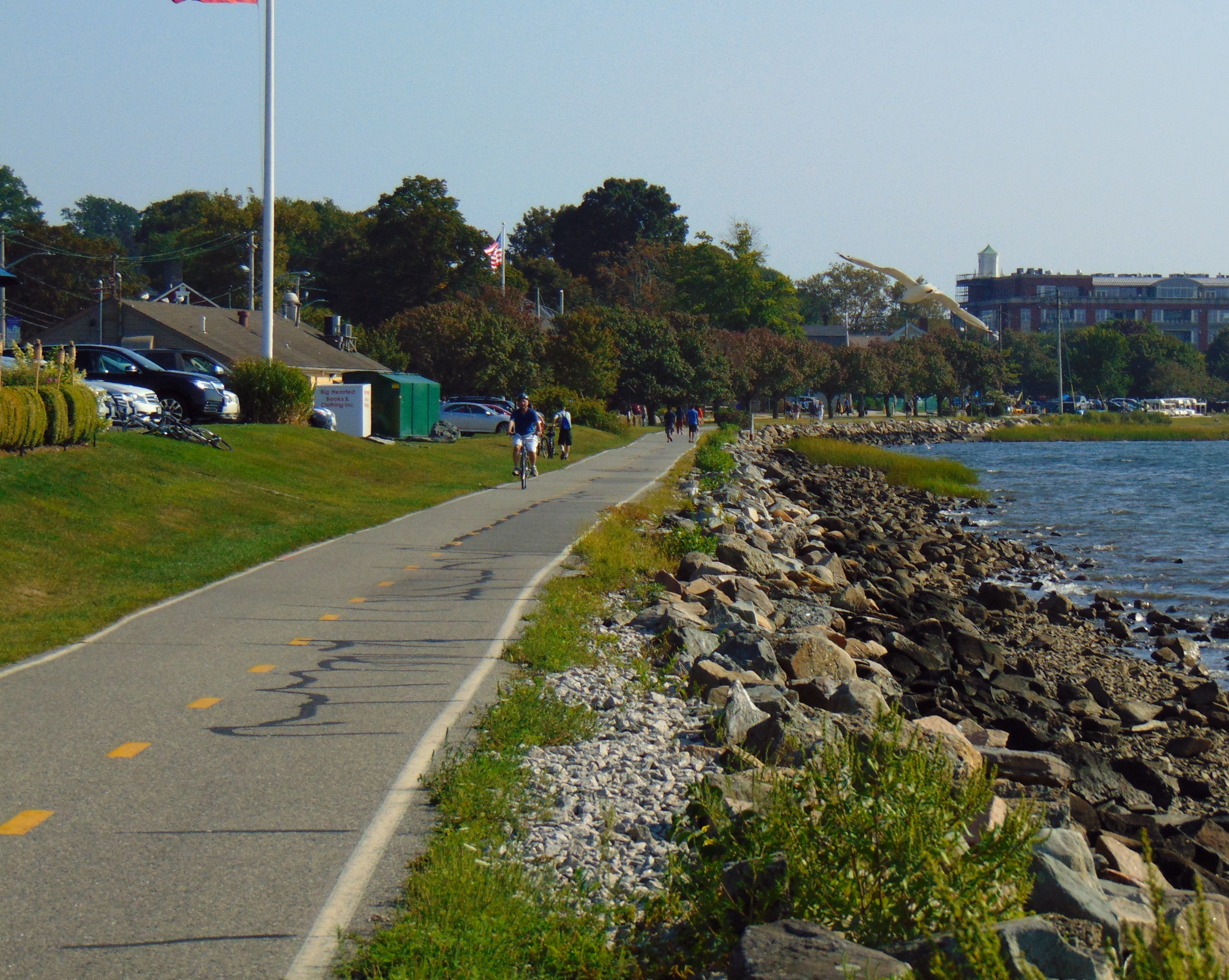
- Facing south near the path's southern terminus in Bristol

East Bay Bike Path
- Length: 14.5 miles (23.3 km)
- Location: Providence County and Bristol County, Rhode Island
- Established: 1992
- Designation: East Coast Greenway
- Trailheads: India Point Park; Bristol, Rhode Island
- Use: Hiking, Walking, Cycling
- Sights: Narragansett Bay
- Surface: Asphalt
- Website: East Bay Bike Path
Trail map

The East Bay Bike Path is a 14.5-mile (23.3 km) paved rail trail in Rhode Island. The path originates in Providence and India Point Park, crosses the Seekonk River via the George Redman Linear Park (opened September 2015) and the Washington Bridge, and continues southeast to Bristol along the shoreline of Narragansett Bay. The path passes through the city of East Providence, the hamlet of Riverside, and the towns of Barrington and Warren. It is part of the East Coast Greenway, a 3,000-mile system of trails connecting the Canada–US border in Maine to Key West, as well as provides access to Haines State Park, Brickyard Pond (Barrington), and Colt State Park.

== History ==
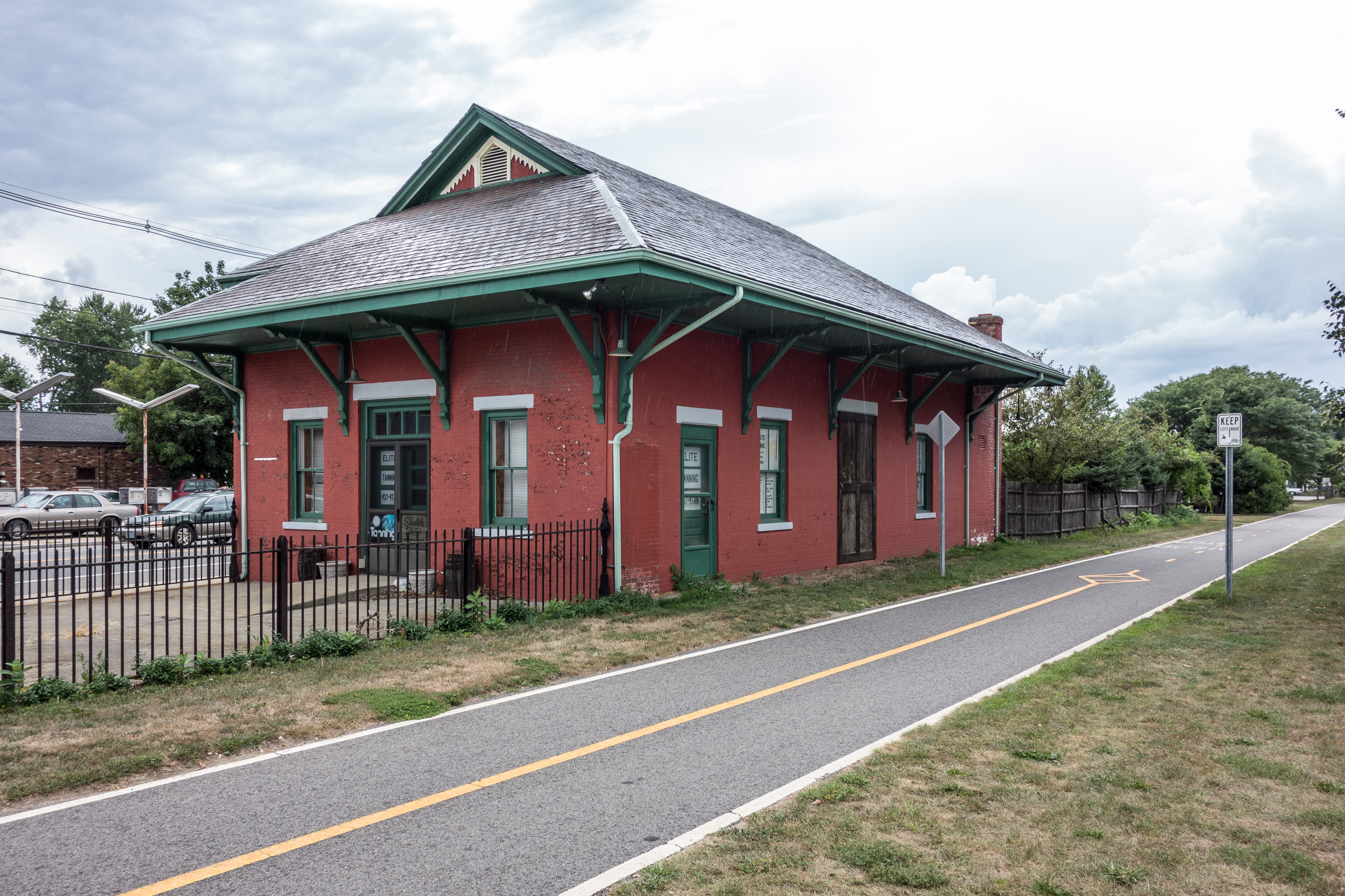
The former Riverside train station stands next to the East Bay Bicycle Path

Most of the East Bay Bike Path runs along the former right-of-way of the Providence, Warren and Bristol Railroad (also referred as the Bristol Secondary) which originally opened in 1855 between Providence and Bristol, Rhode Island. The 14.1-mile (22.7 km) line was operated by the Old Colony Railroad and later the New York, New Haven & Hartford Railroad by the early 20th century. In 1900, the line was electrified and adopted a rapid-transit model of service until 1934. All passenger service was discontinued in 1937.

In 1970, Penn Central requested ICC permission to abandon the line from Providence to Bristol. The Crook Point Bascule Bridge and East Side Tunnel were abandoned by Conrail in 1976 which further limited access to the remainder of the Bristol Secondary; the line would only be accessible via the East Providence Branch and the East Junction Branch. The rest of the line was abandoned in sections by the Providence and Worcester in 1976 due to low freight demand. In 1981, the Rhode Island Department of Transportation briefly considered restoring passenger service to the Bristol Secondary right-of-way as a state-subsidized commuter rail line; however, this proposed service was precluded following the realignment of the Northeast Corridor later in the 1980s. In the present day, visible stretches of abandoned trackage run adjacent to the East Bay Bike Path.

== Construction ==
Conversion of the Bristol Secondary into Rhode Island's first major shared-use path was approved in April 1983 by Governor Edward DiPrete. The path was constructed between 1987 and 1992 on the former railbed of the Bristol Secondary between East Providence and Bristol. The bikeway was constructed in four phases:

1. Riverside Square to Barrington County Road (4.17 miles or 6.71 kilometres)
2. County Road, Barrington to Franklin Street, Warren (2.38 miles or 3.83 kilometres)
3. Franklin Street, Warren to Independence Park, Bristol (3.87 miles or 6.23 kilometres)
4. Riverside Square to India Point Park, Providence (3.98 miles or 6.41 kilometres)

The path was dedicated on May 31, 1992 by Governor Bruce Sundlun. An 8.5 mile on-road bike lane was completed in 2011, linking the East Bay Bike Path with the south tip of the Blackstone River Bikeway, a 48-mile (77 km) trail that will link Providence with Worcester, Massachusetts.

=== Repairs and upgrade ===
Tree roots, erosion, and weather necessitated repairs to the asphalt in 2002, 2007, and 2009. Repairs in mid-2016 targeted the most hazardous areas of the path. Pavement was repaired, destructive tree roots removed, eroded areas reinforced, and new planks were installed on the Barrington trestles.

A section of the bike path was renovated and rebuilt along the Washington Bridge between 2012 and 2015. The park was christened the George Redman Linear Park, opened in September 2015 at a total cost of $21.8 million. It consists of an 11-foot wide bicycle lane, a separated footpath paved with stamped concrete, and several seating areas and is grade-separated from I-195 automobile traffic. It was named in honor of East Providence cyclist George Redman. A plaque honoring Redman can be seen on the west end of the park.

The advanced deterioration of structural elements of the 1900 railroad trestles carrying the Bike Path over the Barrington and Palmer Rivers necessitated their closure in November 2019. The Rhode Island Department of Transportation (RIDOT) had allocated $10 million for their replacement. In Spring 2021, the estimated costs rose to as much as $25 million. RIDOT in 2021 invested $2 million to build a temporary continuous detour using boardwalks on the north side of the Route 114 vehicular bridges across the rivers until a permanent solution could be found. In late 2021, RIDOT issued a request for proposals (RFP) design-build procurement for replacing the bridges. In 2022, Senators Jack Reed and Sheldon Whitehouse provided a total of $14 million ($5 million in March and another $9 million in August) in additional funding toward the project. RIDOT hosted a groundbreaking ceremony for the $24 million design-build project on September 26, 2022 to replace both bridges using an approach that limits shoreline impacts and does not affect nearby utilities. The project was scheduled to be completed by the end of 2025. The bridges were opened on April 6, 2026.

== Route ==
- India Point Park, Providence (terminus) - formerly a rail yard for Boston and Providence Railroad
- Washington Bridge over Seekonk River
- Street running along 1st Street, East Providence
- Follows Veterans Memorial Parkway, developed by the Rhode Island Metropolitan Park Commission
- Bold Point Park / Fort Hill, East Providence
- Transition to former right-of-way of Providence, Warren and Bristol Railroad for remainder of route
- Squantum Woods Park, East Providence, next to the Squantum Association, which grew out of a 19th century tradition of men's groups putting on clam bakes
- Exxon-Mobil terminal for oil tankers
- Pomham Rocks Light
- East Providence Water Pollution Control Plant (sewage treatment), serving East Providence and Barrington
- Haines Memorial State Park, Barrington
- Bridge over Barrington River (rerouted to temporary dedicated bridge as of summer 2022)
- Bridge over Palmer River (rerouted to temporary dedicated bridge as of summer 2022)
- Burr's Hill Park, Warren
- Claire D. McIntosh Wildlife Refuge, Bristol
- Colt State Park, Bristol
- Independence Park, Bristol (terminus)

== Gallery ==
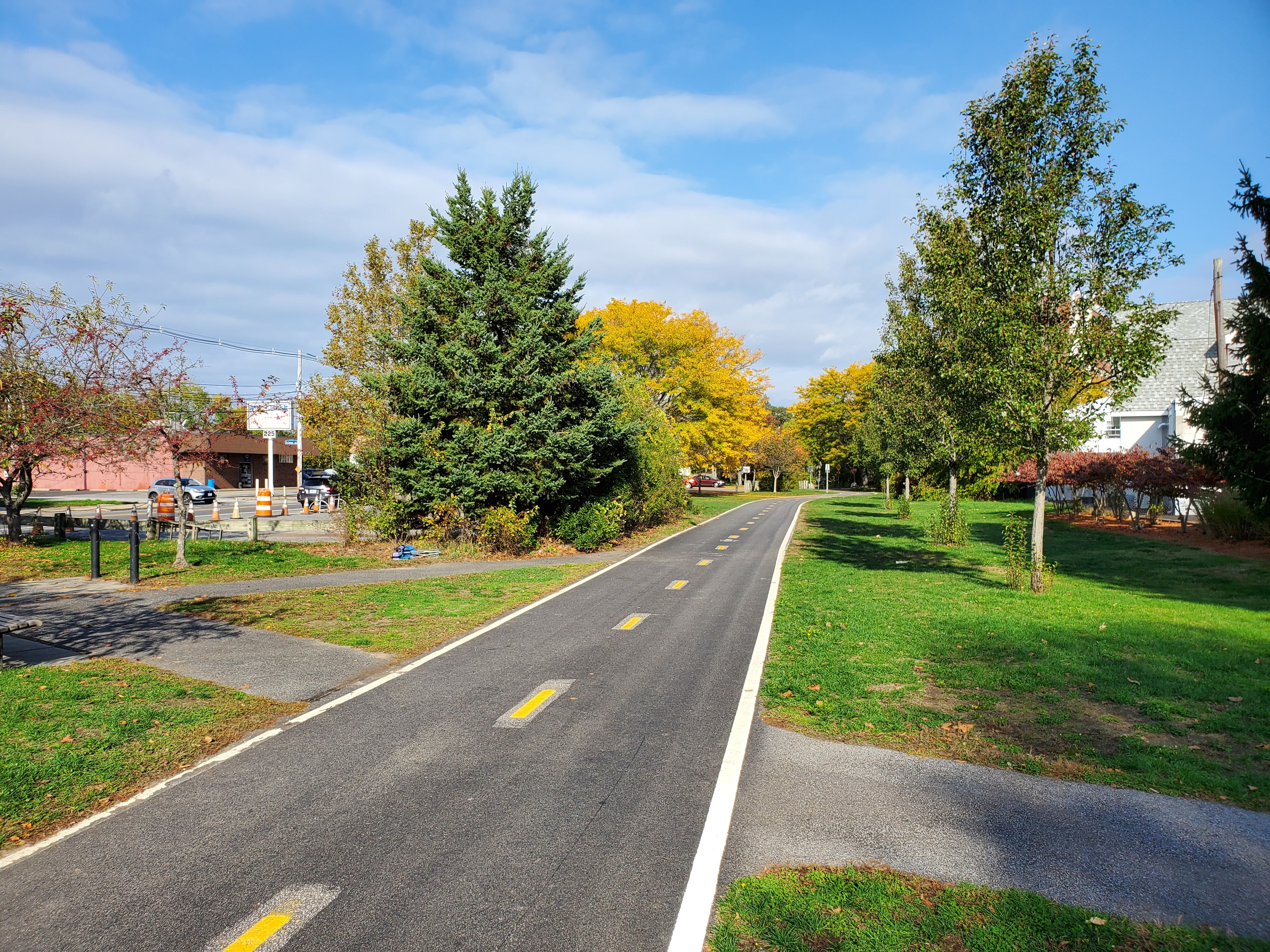

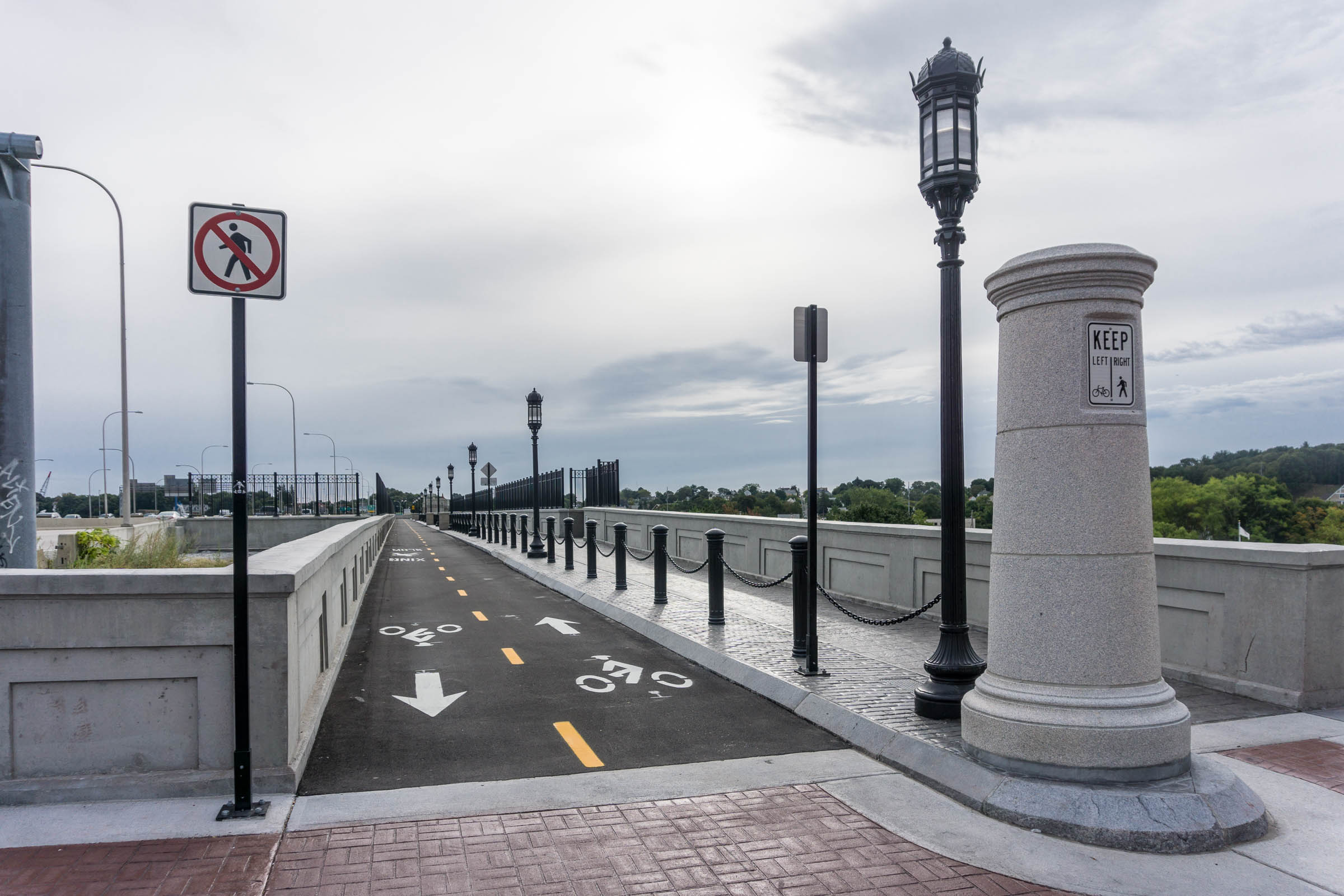

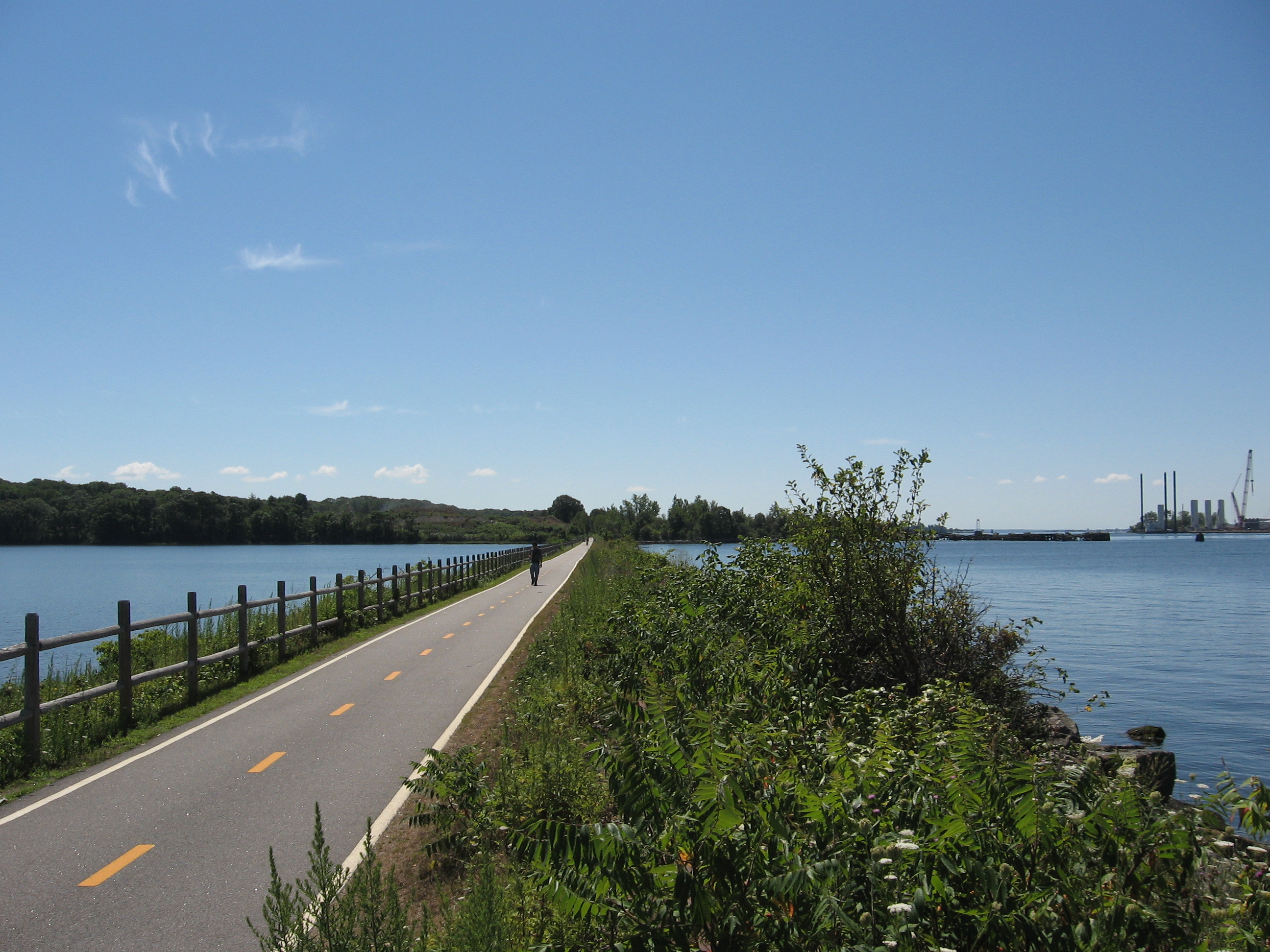
