= Chedwel, New York =

Community in Chautauqua County, New York, United States

Coordinates: 42°12′59″N 79°26′07″W

Chedwel is a small community in Chautauqua County, New York, United States, on the north shore of Chautauqua Lake, about halfway between Bemus Point and Mayville, between State Route 430 and the lake. It is at an elevation of 1335 ft (407 m) above sea level.

== History ==
The area gained its name as the estate of Dr. Charles Edgar Welch (hence Ch-ed-wel), youngest son of Dr. Thomas Bramwell Welch, who pioneered the development of unfermented grape juice as a drink. Charles Edgar, who shared his father's profession of dentistry, became involved in the grape juice enterprise as a young man, and began to run the Vineland, New Jersey, business independently in 1875. Within two decades, he founded the Welch's Grape Juice Company, and in 1897 relocated it to Westfield, New York, on the shores of Lake Erie just a few miles northwest of the tip of Chautauqua Lake. The estate at Chedwel included two main houses built by the Welchs, with adjacent cottages for guests, a tennis court, and a croquet court. Charles Edgar Welch was, among other things, six-time mayor of Westfield, a New York State gubernatorial candidate in 1916, and a trustee of Chautauqua Institution, located directly across the lake from Chedwel. The property was parceled and sold by the mid-twentieth century. The community presently includes, besides the former Welch domiciles, several other homes built along its two streets, Chedwel Road and Overlook Avenue.

One of the original buildings was a large log cabin. The interior of the cabin, including the accessories, was built entirely from logs and branches of trees. The beds, light fixtures, towel racks, door openers, even the toilet paper holders, are made from logs and tree branches. These pieces were gathered by the brother of Elbert Hubbard, of Roycroft fame, who spent untold hours walking through the woods looking for branches of just the right shape for various purposes in the cabin.

In the summer of 1913 a camp for girls, sponsored and run by the Chautauqua County YWCA, was established on the Welch summer estate and was known, not surprisingly, as Camp Chedwel. The girls, counselors, and cooks were housed in nine tents. The program consisted of activities such as Bible study, nature study, games, singing, and talks on home economics. Every evening a campfire was lit by the girls in their ceremonial dress. Songs and stories led to the conclusion of the day with an inspirational address.

The camp was governed by a Senate, composed of the counselors, and a House of Representatives, made up of one girl from each tent, chosen by the girls themselves. This governing body made the rules by which the camp was governed.

The food, by all accounts, was excellent. The cooks prepared the meals but the girls set the tables, served the meal, washed the dishes, and cleaned the dining room and kitchen.

Dr. Welch took great interest and pleasure in having Camp Chedwel at his summer estate. It is not clear how many years the camp continued to be held.

In later years, Chedwel expanded as private lots were sold. Many of those lots were purchased by Methodist bishops and clergy who built summer homes on the site.

== See also ==
- Thomas Bramwell Welch
- Welch's
- Grape juice
- Ellery, New York
