= Cheektowaga Southwest, New York =

Cheektowaga Southwest
- Former CDP
- Location within the state of New York
- Coordinates: 42°52′51″N 78°46′45″W
- Country: United States
- State: New York
- Counties: Erie
- Town: Cheektowaga

Area
  - Land: 3.40 sq mi (8.81 km^{2})

Population (1960)
  - Total: 12,766
  - Density: 3,750/sq mi (1,450/km^{2})
- Time zone: UTC-5 (Eastern (EST))
  - Summer (DST): UTC-4 (EDT)
- ZIP code: 14227
- Area code: 716
- FIPS code: 36-15033

Cheektowaga Southwest was a census-designated place within the southwestern part of the town of Cheektowaga in Erie County, New York during the 1960 United States census. The population recorded was 12,766. The census area dissolved in 1970, however the census area became part of Cheektowaga CDP in 1980, when the CDP recorded a population of 92,145. The ZIP code serving the area is 14227.

== Geography ==
Located at approximately 42.880873 north and 78.779236 west, the census area of Cheektowaga Southwest was bounded by the city of Buffalo to the west, the village of Sloan to the north and the CDP of West Seneca to the south. The land area of the CDP was 3.4 square miles.

== See also ==
- Cheektowaga (CDP)
- Cheektowaga Northwest
