= Little Neck Cemetery =

United States historic place in Rhode Island

- U.S. National Register of Historic Places
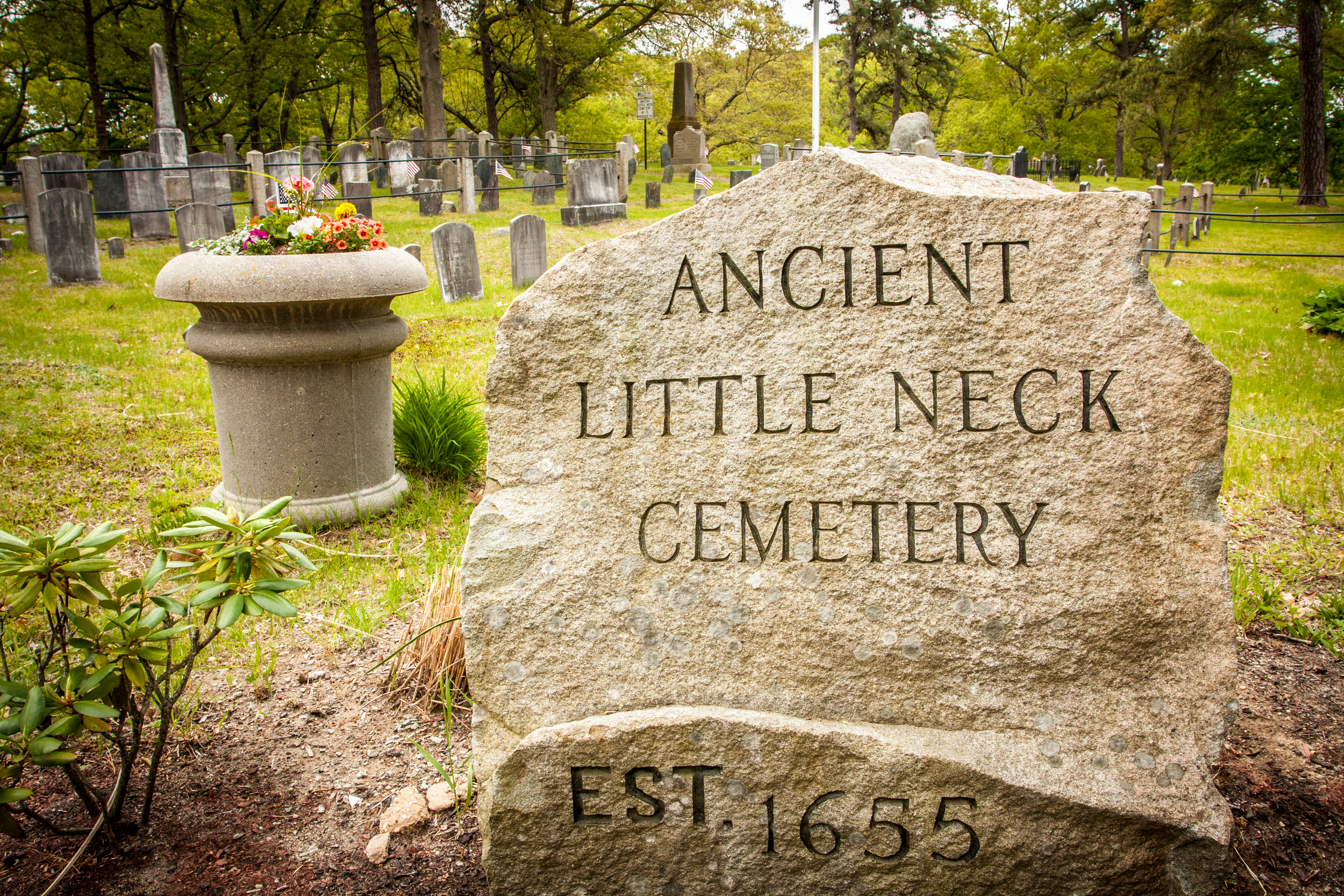

- Location within Rhode Island Location within the United States
- Location: East Providence, Rhode Island
- Coordinates: 41°45′59″N 71°21′18″W
- Built: 1655
- MPS: East Providence MRA
- NRHP reference No.: 80000100
- Added to NRHP: November 28, 1980

The Little Neck Cemetery is a historic cemetery off Read Street in East Providence, Rhode Island, United States.

The cemetery was founded in 1655, when the area was part of Rehoboth, Massachusetts, and is one of the oldest colonial cemeteries in Rhode Island. It was added to the National Register of Historic Places in 1980.

== Famous and historical burials ==
Little Neck Cemetery is a historical and cultural resource of much importance. It contains the gravestones of people who have played an important part in the history of East Providence and other American societies.

The oldest recorded burial is that of John Brown, Jr. (who died 1662), son of the man who purchased Wannamoisett from the Wampanoag Indians. The gravestone of Elizabeth Tilley Howland (died 1687) is also there. Howland was a passenger on the Mayflower ship and was one of the original settlers of the Plymouth Colony. She died at the Swansea, Massachusetts farm of her daughter and son-in-law and was buried near there at Little Neck. Today her grave is marked by a finely carved slate marker put up in 1946 by the Howland Family Association.

The most renowned person buried at Little Neck, however, is Captain Thomas Willett (died 1674). Willett, son-in-law of John Brown of Wannamoisett, settled in what is currently East Providence in a house that was located on Willett Avenue (now the site of the Willett Arms Apartments). He is noted for serving as the first English mayor of New York. The Willett plot, surrounded by a stone-post and iron rail fence, is now marked by a large boulder put down by the City Club of New York and that also contains the original stones marking the graves of Willett and his wife, Mary, who died in 1669.

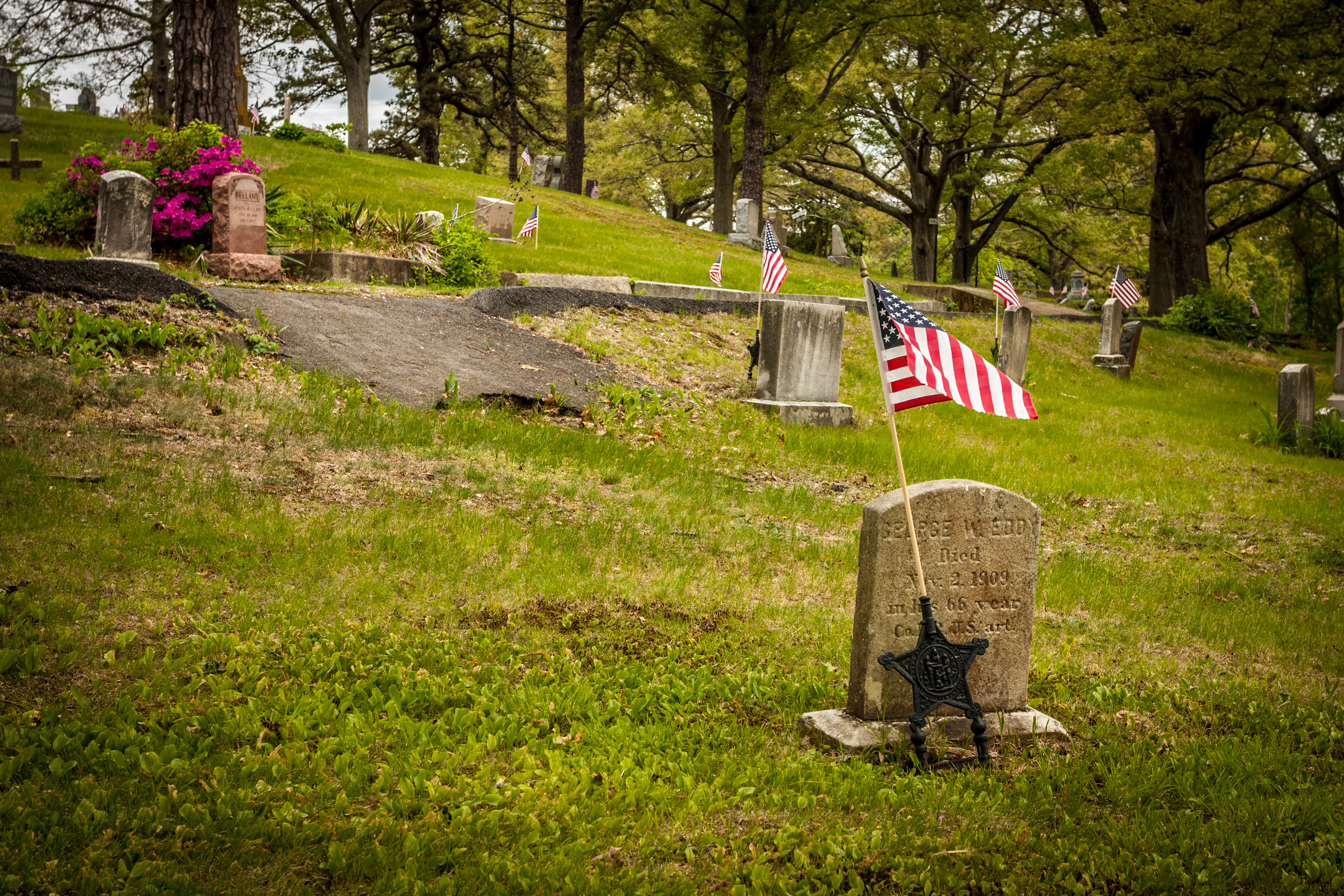
Hillside in Little Neck Cemetery

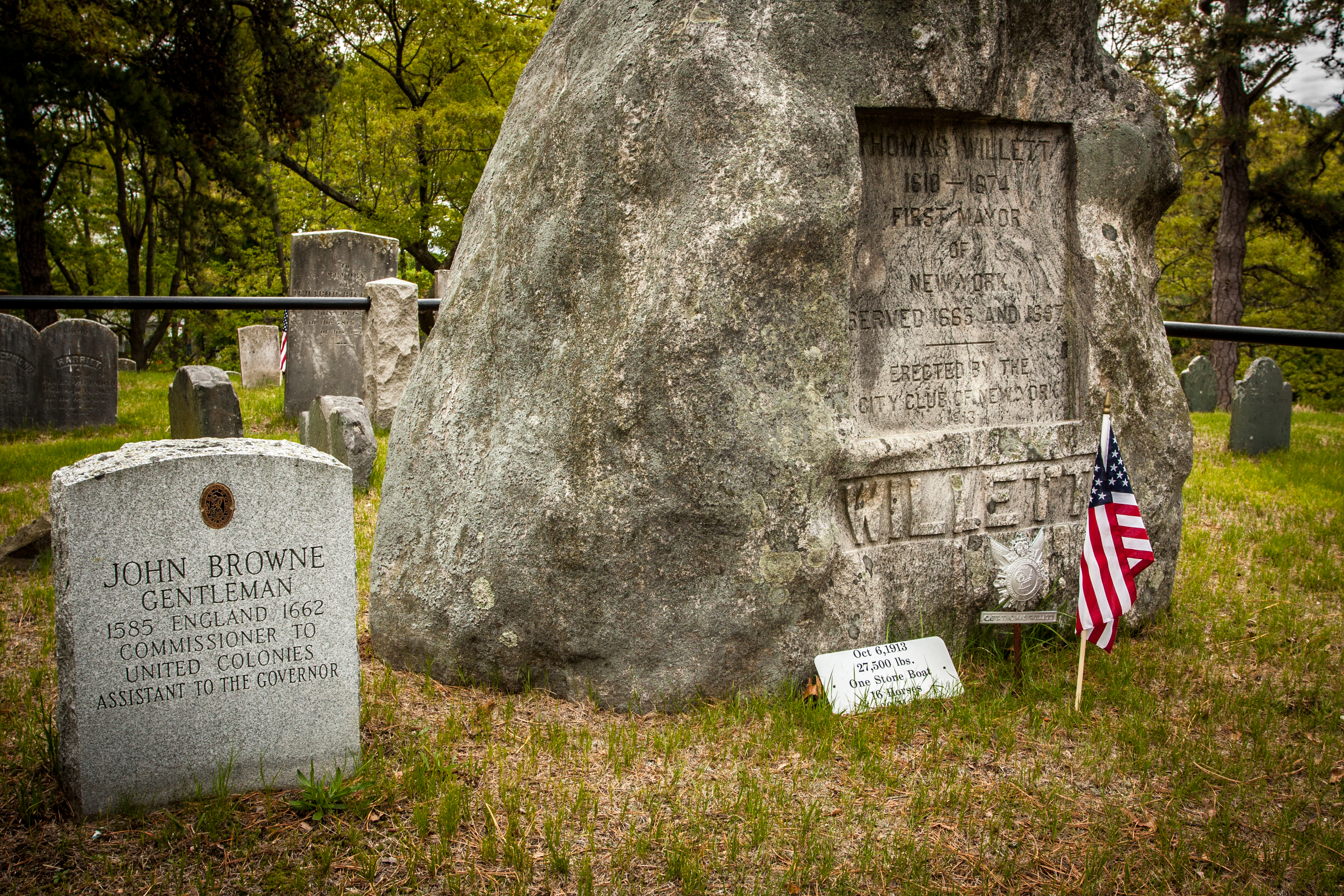
Willett and Browne headstones

== See also ==
- National Register of Historic Places listings in Providence County, Rhode Island
